= Donausteig (Danube Trail) =

Hiking trail

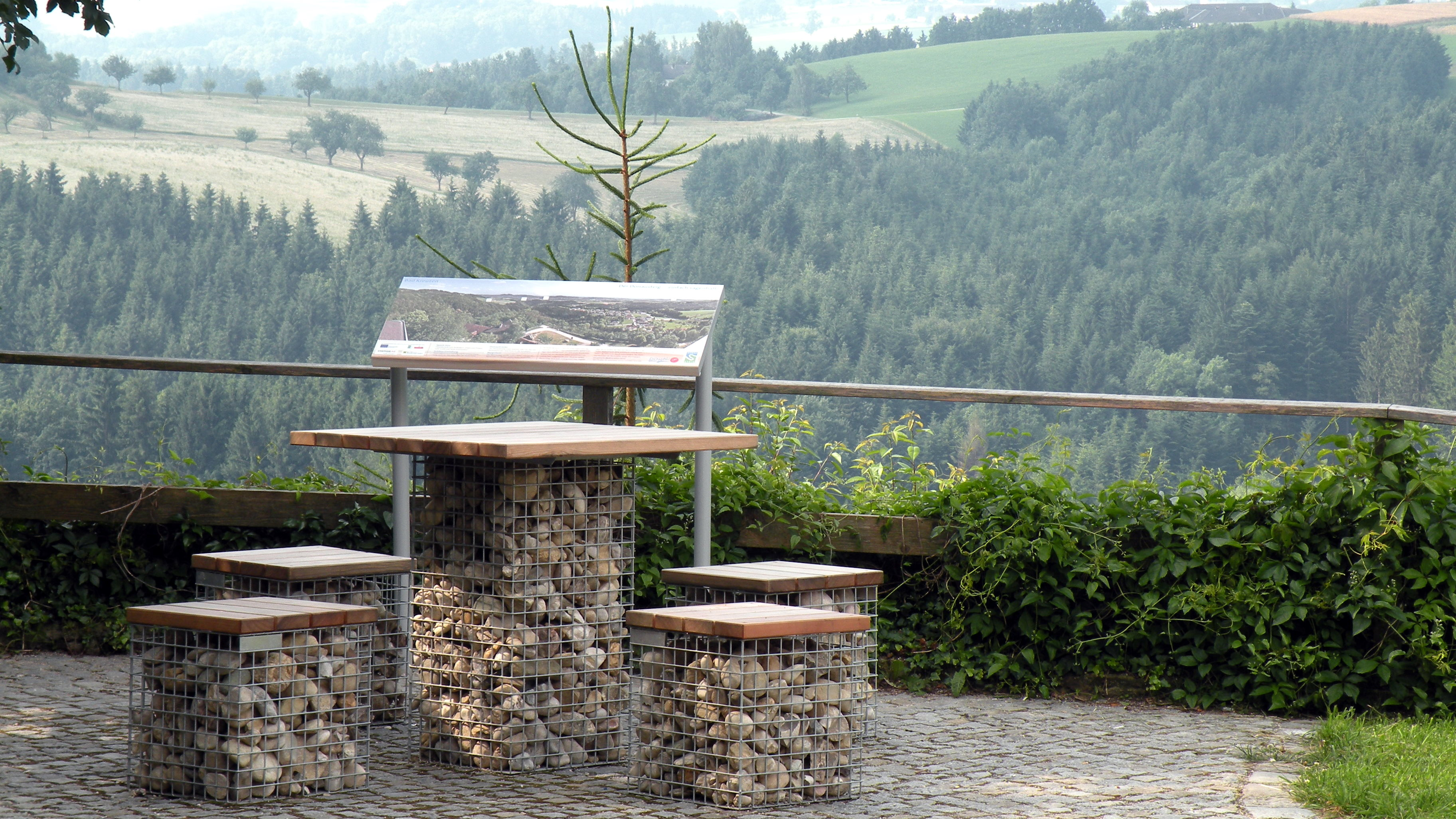
Rest area with a scenic view of the Donausteig.

The Donausteig is a hiking trail that passes through parts of Bavaria and Austria. Since the summer of 2010, the trail follows both banks of the Danube, from Passau via Linz up to St. Nikola and Grein.

== Description ==
The Donausteig trail is a non-alpine, long-distance trail. It has a length of around 450 km, with 23 stages, and it extends through 5 Bavarian and 40 Austrian municipalities. The Donausteig runs mostly through natural landscapes, and includes popular scenic spots and viewing areas.

In addition to the main routes, 41 official Donausteig routes have been marked; 135 start, rest and viewing areas have been set up along the trail; and 4000 trail markers have been set up. In Passau, the route connects to the "Golden Trail", which was opened in 2007.

As well as the Danube Cycle Path, the ‘Boat Trip along the Danube’ and ‘Culture on the Danube’, the Donausteig is a project created by the Danube Tourist Board of Upper Austria, with its 37 member municipalities. It was partly funded by the public purse (EU, Country, Municipality).

=== Nature reserves ===
The Donausteig leads through the Natura 2000 and Habitats Directive-protected areas Oberes Donau- und Aschachtal, where the landscape is characterized by hillside and ravine forests. It also runs through the bird sanctuary Oberes Donautal; the FFH- and the bird sanctuary Traun–Donau-Auen; the planned Natura 2000 and Northern Machland area; the nature protection areas Donauleiten in Bavaria und Pesenbachtal; Rannatal, the Tal des Kleinen Kößlbaches, and Castle Neuhaus.

Among the points of interest along the trail are the Strudengau with the Stillensteinklamm, the Wolfschlucht near Bad Kreuzen, the Floodplains of the Northern Machland, the Klamschlucht, the Pesenbachtal, the Obere Donautal Oberösterreichs with the Schlögener Schlinge, the Rannatal and the Tal des Kleinen Kößlbachs.

=== Buildings ===
- Greinburg Castle in Grein: The oldest residential castle in Austria is open to the public. Historical rooms can be viewed (knight's hall, castle chapel, the diamond arch, the Sala Terrena, the Arcade Court and the Upper Austrian Boat Trip Museum). The festival halls used by the Coburgs can be visited as part of a tour.
- Gobelwarte, observation tower in Grein
- Seven-arched viaduct of the Donauuferbahn between Grein und St. Nikola
- Ruins of Schaunberg Castle between Aschach and Eferding: was the Duke of Schaunberg's family castle
- Ars Electronica Center, Museum of digital art and new media art in Linz
- Lentos Art Museum in Linz
- Old und New Cathedral in Linz
- Brucknerhaus, Event and concert hall in Linz
- Linzer Castle: on a hill in the old town of Linz
- Pöstlingbergbahn in Linz, the longest adhesion railway in Europe
- Burg Clam in the Perg district in Upper Austria's Mühlviertel: a castle on a wooded mountain ridge overlooking Klam market, sloping steeply towards the Klam ravine.

== Course of the Trail ==
The Donausteig trail runs along the Danube River, starting in Passau and passing through Linz, the former European Capital of Culture, to Grein, an Upper Austrian town with an altitude of 218 meters above sea level, the lowest in the region.

In several day-long sections, hiking enthusiasts can walk along the Donausteig’s 450 kilometers-long track. Starting in Passau and passing the chapel Maria am Walde , one arrives at Freinberg, from where one can enjoy the Dreiflüsseblick , an elevated view of the surrounding area. From there, the path leads through the nature reserve called Kleines Kößlbachtal , past the Donauleiten and towards Vichtenstein. The Donausteig then leads right alongside the Danube to Wesenufer. From there it continues to the Vier-Viertel-Blick and the Schlögener Blick, offering a great view of the boldest natural highlight of the Donausteig: the Schlögener Schlinge. From Aschach, the hiking trail then leads up to the castle ruin Burgruine Schaunberg, to Eferding and Wilhering. From there one has the possibility to cross the Danube on a ferry to Ottensheim.

The next section of the Donausteig trail contains several highlights such as the Pöstlingberg, which has one of the steepest adhesion railways in all over Europe: the Pöstlingbergbahn. The next big stop along the trail is Linz, which offers interesting sightseeing spots such as its historic old town, the new and old dome, the baroque Linzer Hauptplatz (town square), the Ars Electronica Center, the Lentos Art Museum, the Castle Museum Linz, the city museum Nordico, the Brucknerhaus, the Linz State Theatre and the Voestalpine Stahlwelt .

Starting in Linz, one can follow the gravel paths leading through the cultural landscape to Rohrbach, St. Florian and eventually Enns. Taking the ferry from Enghagen, one can reach Mauthausen and hike through the flat landscape along field paths on to Perg. From the town's central square the Donausteig continues to Baumgartenberg, to Saxen via the Burg Clam and the Klamschlucht, and eventually to Grein via the Gobelwarte. The final legs of the trail lead the hiker via St. Nikola and Sarmingstein to Waldhausen and finally back to Grein via Bad Kreuzen.

== Donausteigrunden (circular trails) ==
The 41 Donausteigrunden were created for frequent hikers. They branch off from the main route of the Donausteig and lead into the more remote countryside and to numerous viewing points.

=== Wilhering – Bauern- und Holzknechtrunde ===
The starting point for the Bauern- und Holzknechtrunde (farmers and woodcutters tour) is the ferry terminal at Wilhering. From the main road, in direction of Linz, the circular trail runs through the center of the town and onto a field path. From a little hill a beautiful view across Ottensheim and Wilhering can be enjoyed. The trail continues from there uphill through the Kürnberger forest and then downhill again on a wooden natural trail to the settlement of Mühlbach. Over plain fields and small hills the trail leads back to the Danube. At the Ottensheim-Wilhering power station, the circular trail reconnects with the Donausteigand leads back to Wilhering.

=== City trail Pöstlingberg ===
Starting point is the information board Donaussteig/Urfahrmarkt, adjacent to the Ars Electronica Center. From here a direct view down Linz's cultural mile can be enjoyed, with the Lentos Art Museum, the Brucknerhaus and the Linz Castle. The trail then leads alongside the Danube to the new town hall, before arriving at the street Obere Donaustraße. Subsequently, the trail crosses the path of the Pöstlingbergbahn, the steepest adhesion railway in Europe. Turning left, the path continues along the Schablederweg, which runs alongside the tracks of the Pöstlingbergbahn for the most part. Not far from here, the zoo Linzer Tiergarten welcomes animal lovers. The trail continues all the way up to the 537 meter high Pöstlingberg, which is also dubbed Acropolis of Linz. The Linzer Grottenbahn fairy-tale grotto, the baroque Wallfahrtsbasilika and the rose garden are further points of interest along the way. The Grottenbahn runs through a colourful fairytale world with scenes from famous fairytales on display. In the lower part of the fortification tower, one can find a miniature model of what the town's main square looked like in 1900. The panorama terrace Sieben Schmerzen Mariä offers a grand view of Linz. Via a steep path the Collegium Petrinum, an episcopal high school that was founded at the end of the 19th century, can be reached. From there the trail leads back to the information board at the Ars Electronica Center. After the hike, it seems legitimate to explore the nearby old town of Linz, which is easily accessible via the Nibelungenbrücke bridge.

== Municipalities on the Danube Trail (in alphabetical order) ==
Out of the 45 municipalities that can be found on the Danube trail, five are in Bavaria (Germany) and 40 are in Upper Austria.

The trail runs through a total of seven upper Austrian ‘leader regions’ (from West to East): Sauwald, Donau-Böhmerwald, Hausruck Nord, Eferding, Urfahr-West, Linz-Land and Strudengau.

A description of the trail routes which start in the respective municipality is given in brackets.

=== Bavaria ===
- Kellberg/Thyrnau (Kellberger Keltenrunde with Facklmühle, König-Max-Höhe, Donaublick and Grafmühle; a tour which passes two mills and a panorama spot, 8,9 kilometers)
- Obernzell (Zeller Donausteigrunde with Hammermühle, 9,9 kilometers)
- Passau (Donausteigrunde with Feste Oberhaus, 6,8 kilometers)
- Untergriesbach (Sonnenweg with castle ruins of Neu- and Altjochenstein, 5,7 kilometers)

=== Austria ===
- Aschach (Koblrunde with Schoppermuseum, 3,4 kilometers)
- Asten (Zollordnungsweg; a path with the outdoor museum Sumerauerhof, 16,9 km)
- Bad Kreuzen (Kreuzner Donaublickrunde with Burg Kreuzen and Wolfsschlucht, a danube panorama tour which passes a castle and a canyon, 16,8 kilometers)
- Baumgartenberg (Voralpenblickrunde with Stift Baumgartenberg)
- Eferding (Gschicht´nweg with Castle Starhemberg, it is the so-called path of tales and passes the castle Starhemberg, 2,2 kilometers)
- Engelhartszell (Trappistenrunde with Panoramablick Moarfelsen, Panorama Donaublick and Panorambühne, a tour with three panorama spots, 11,9 kilometers)
- Enns (Cittàslowrunde with the castle Ennsegg and the city tower, 1,8 kilometers)
- Esternberg (Kösslbachrunde with Wanklmoar Sag, 15,7 kilometers)
- Feldkirchen (passing castle Bergheim, castle Mühldorf, castle Pesenbachtal and castle Prälatenstein, 20,7 kilometers)
- Freinberg (Passaublick-Severinsweg with Passaublick in Unterfreinberg, with panorama spots, 9,5 kilometers)
- Grein (Greiner Donaublickrunde with Castle Greinburg, Stadttheater and Kalvarienberg, a path calling at castle Greinburg and the city theater, 5,8 kilometers)
- Haibach (CICONIA path with Schlögener Blick and Steiner Felsen, 11,2 kilometers)
- Hartkirchen (Schaunbergrunde with the castle ruin Schaunberg and the Pupping monastery, 10,7 kilometers)
- Hofkirchen (cascade tour with the Bockbach waterfall, 8,4 kilometers)
- Kirchberg (Donausteigrunde with observation tower and Burgstallblick, a panoramic tour, 16,8 kilometers)
- Klam (Rundwanderweg Klam with castle Burg Clam, 6 kilometers)
- Kleinzell/Sankt Martin (a stony path with a natural water body called Resilacke, Erlebniswelt Granit and Castle Neuhaus, 12,8 kilometers)
- Lembach (Leinenweberweg with an adventure playground and the Mühlholz chapel, 15,1 kilometers)
- Linz (Donausteigrunde with Pöstlingberg, AEC and Grottenbahn, a city path through the town of Linz, 7,7 kilometers)
- Mauthausen (a path which is a dedicated „healthy municipality hiking path“ with the Castle Pragstein and a pharmacy museum, 4,6 kilometers)
- Mitterkirchen (Teufelsweg with Keltendorf Mitterkirchen, it is called Devil's path, 12,4 kilometers)
- Naarn (Fuchtelmanderlweg in the Aulandschaft, the path got its name by the legend of a little men called Fuchtelmanderl, 26,6 kilometers)
- Neustift (Bishop Firmian, a path which passes the Rannatal and offers a view of the Danube at Penzenstein, 12,9 kilometers)
- Niederkappel (Donauschlingenweg with the Burgruine Haichenbach, an educational nature trail which passes the Danube loop and the castle ruin Hachenbach, 19,2 kilometers)
- Niederranna
- Oberkappel
- Ottensheim (Donau-Panoramaweg, a panoramic path with nice views over the Danube, 8,2 kilometers)
- Perg (Kugelmanderlweg with Kalvarienberg, the path named after a local tale, 9,1 kilometers)
- Pfarrkirchen (Traumblickrunde in the Rannatal with Ruine Falkenstein; a path through the nature reserve Rannatal with castle ruin Falkenstein, 15,7 kilometers);
- Pupping (Wolfgangrunde with the chapel of Landerl and castle ruin Schaunberg, 12,2 kilometers)
- St. Agatha (Es mueß seyn Weg with Schlögener Blick, Fadinger Denkmal and Ruine Stauff, a path with a memorial, a panorama spot and a castle ruin, 20,7 kilometers)
- Sankt Florian (Mühlsteinweg with Sumerauerhof and an educational nature trail, 8,6 kilometers)
- St. Nikola (Burg Werfenstein tour passing the Stillensteinklamm, 5,7 kilometers)
- Saxen
- Vichtenstein (Fuchsenlochweg with castle ruin Burg Vichtenstein, 6,7 kilometers)
- Steyregg (Steyregger tour with Finstergraben, 8,6 kilometers)
- Waldhausen (Ausblicksrunde with Stift Waldhausen, Schwingender Stein and Aussichtswarte, a trail with different panorama spots 12,8 kilometers)
- Waldkirchen (Vier-Viertel-Blick-Runde im Kleinen Kösslbachtal, panorama views through a small valley, 12,8 kilometers)
- Wilhering (Bauern- und Holzknechtrunde: farmers and woodcutters tour with the Kürnberger forest and a fish educational trail, 15,8 kilometers)
