= Gießenbach (Danube) =

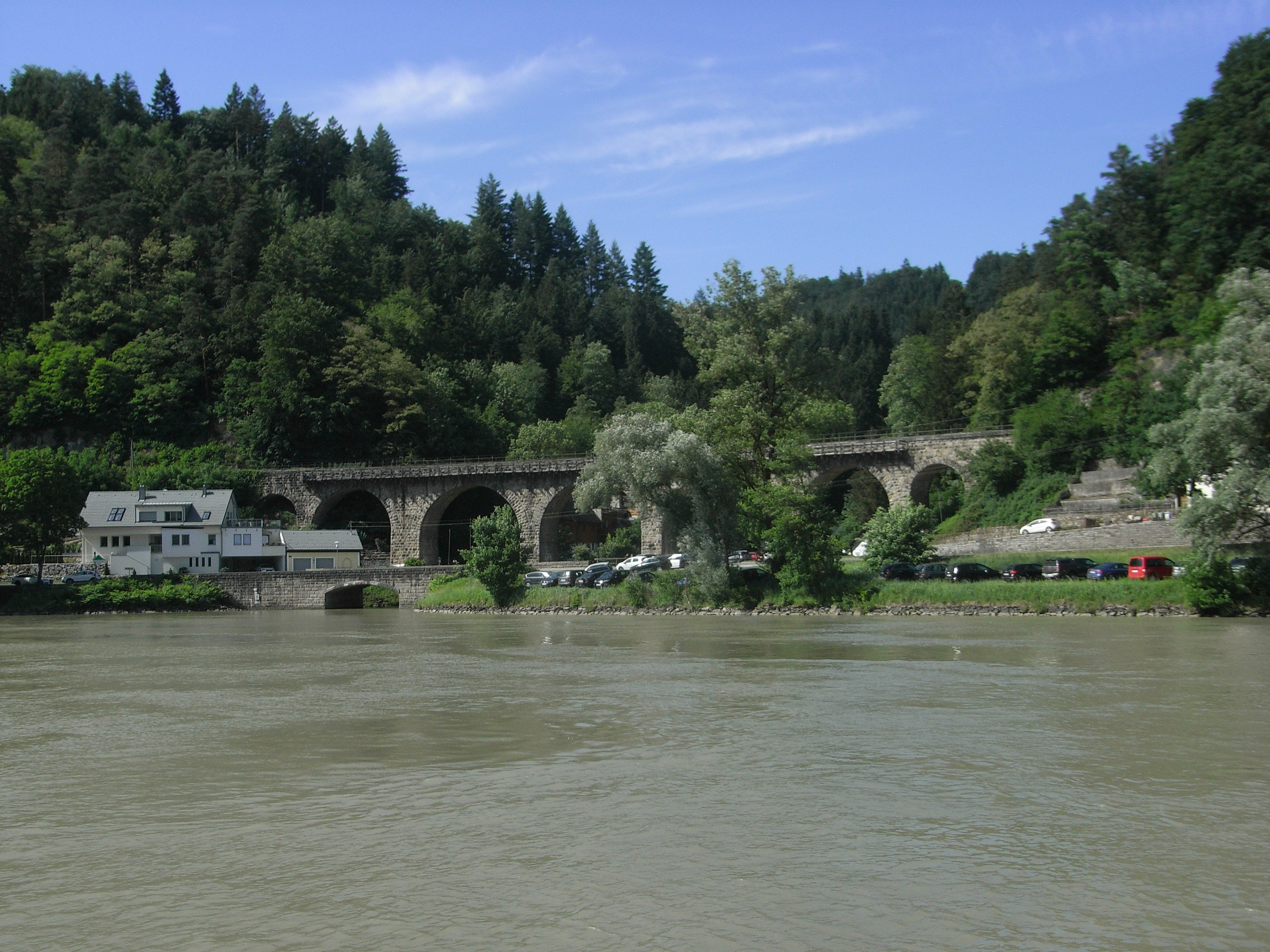

Location
- Country: Austria
- State: Upper Austria

Physical characteristics
- Source
  - location: Sankt Georgen am Walde
  - elevation: about 830 metres (2,720 ft) metres above the Adriatic
- Mouth
  - location: between Grein and Sankt Nikola an der Donau
  - coordinates: 48°14′01″N 14°53′12″E
  - elevation: about 230 metres (750 ft) metres above the Adriatic
- Length: 9.3 km (5.8 mi)
- Basin size: 64 km^{2} (25 sq mi)

Basin features
- Progression: Danube→ Black Sea

The Gießenbach is a river of Austria. Its drainage basin is 64 km^{2} (25 sq mi).

The Gießenbach flows in the East of the Perg District in Upper Austria. It is a tributary of the Danube; its mouth is located between Grein and Sankt Nikola an der Donau.

== Course ==
The Gießenbach, referred to in the upper reaches as Vogelsammühlbach, rises in the district Ebenedt of Sankt Georgen am Walde at about 830 metres (2,720 ft) metres above the Adriatic. The brook flows from north to south through several communities, forms or crosses in its course repeatedly the boundary between different municipalities and finally flows at the border between Grein and Sankt Nikola near the isle Wörth into the Danube at about 230 metres (750 ft) metres above the Adriatic.

The Gießenbach touches or crosses the following communities: St. Georgen am Walde, Pabneukirchen, Dimbach, Waldhausen im Strudengau, Bad Kreuzen, Grein und St. Nikola an der Donau.

Left tributaries of the Gießenbach and Vogelsammühlbach, resp., are the Haselböckbach, the Gassnerbach and the Blümelbach with te Leimlehnerbach, right tributaries are the Sagmüllerbach with the Riedersdorfmühlbach.

The Gießenbach flows through natural wet meadows and several gorges, with the Stillensteinklamm being the best known of them. A special noteworthiness of the Gießenbach is the endangered freshwater pearl mussel.

== Economy ==
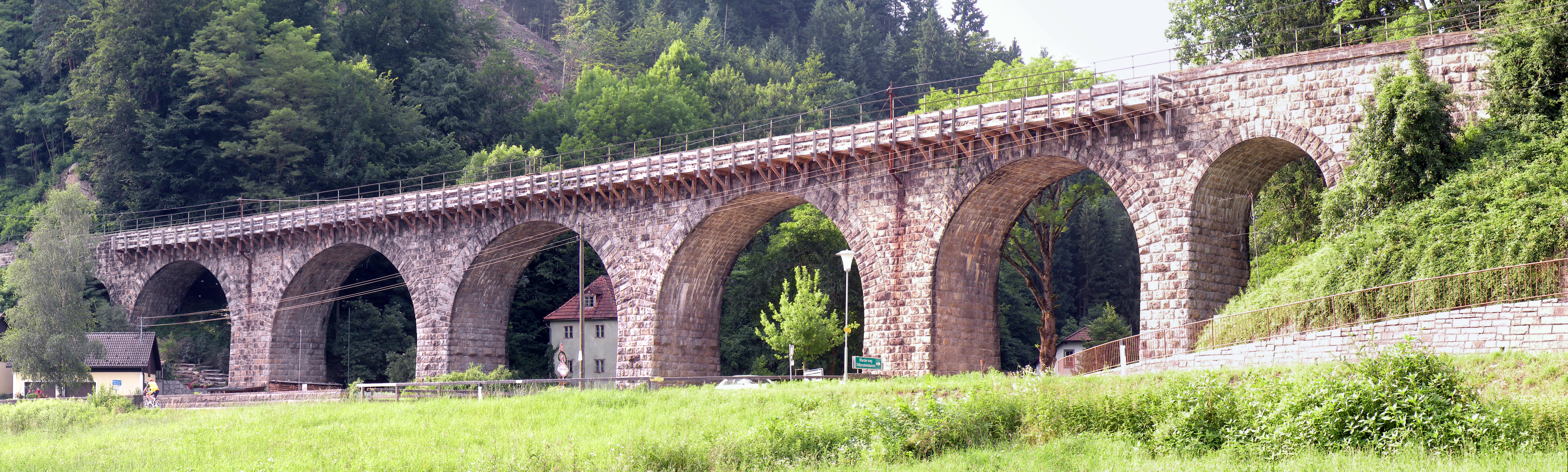
seven-arched railway viaduct over the Gießenbach at the entrance of the Stillensteinklamm near Grein

Eighteen mills were once in operation at the Gießenbach and its tributaries; for example the Gießenbachmühle, the Aumühle, the Klausmühle, the Grasmühle, the Sagmühle, the Hagenmühle, the Riedersdorfmühle, the Vogelsammühle. In the first half of the 19th century the stream was used for timber rafting. Today, there are several small power plants.

Since the second half of the 19th century, a hiking trail leads through the Stillensteinklamm, which has been destroyed several times by flood disasters. Since 2010, it has been part of the Donausteig. The entrance to the Stillensteinklamm at the mouth of the Gießenbach lies on the Danube Cycle Path.

Since 1909, the Gießenbachtal at the exit of the Stillensteinklamm at the mouth of the Gießenbach into the Danube is crossed by the Donauuferbahn by means of a very high seven-arched viaduct.
