= List of subcamps of Mauthausen =

External images
- Alternate list of Mauthausen sub-camps

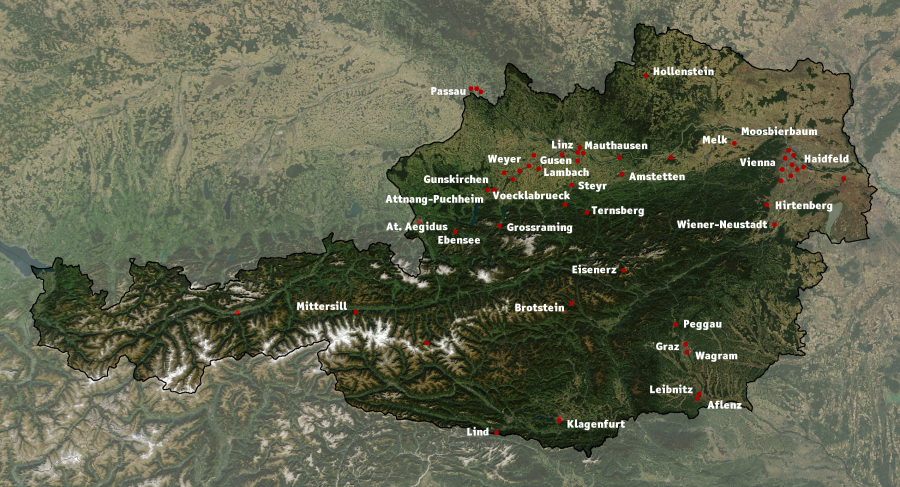
Location of notable Mauthausen sub-camps

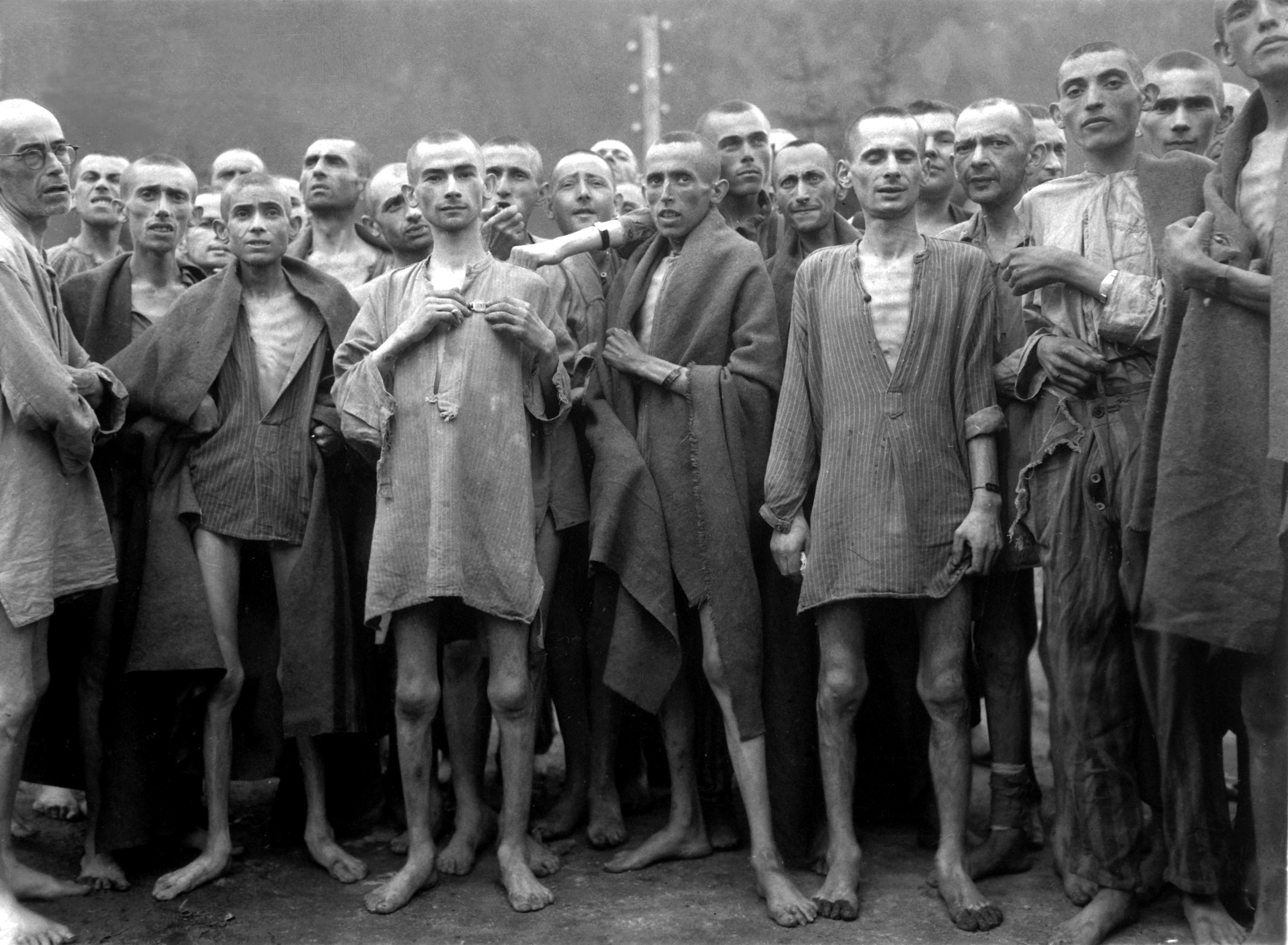
Ebensee prisoners

This is a list of subcamps of the Mauthausen concentration camp. The slave labour of the inmates was also used by a variety of companies and farms that accommodated a small number of inmates on their own.

== List of subcamps ==
1. Aflenz
2. Amstetten
  1. Frauenlager
  2. Männerlager
3. Attnang-Puchheim
4. Bachmanning
5. Bretstein: KZ-Nebenlager Bretstein
6. Dipoldsau
7. Ebelsberg
8. Ebensee: KZ Ebensee
9. Eisenerz
10. Enns
11. Ennsdorf
12. Floridsdorf
13. Frankenburg am Hausruck (Schlier-Redl-Zipf)
14. Graz
15. Grein
16. Großraming
17. Gunskirchen
  1. Waldwerke I
  2. Sammellager
18. Gusen complex
  1. Gusen I (located at Gusen in the community of Langenstein)
  2. Gusen II (located at St Georgen in the community of Sankt Georgen an der Gusen)
  3. Gusen III (located at Lungitz in the community of Katsdorf)
19. Haidfeld
20. Schloß Hartheim, not properly a subcamp of Mauthausen but an institution of the Aktion T-4 where some thousands inmates of Mauthausen-Gusen and Dachau were killed.
21. Hinterbrühl
22. Hirtenberg
23. Hollenstein
24. Jedlsee
25. Klagenfurt
26. Lambach
27. Schloß Lannach
28. Leibnitz
29. Lenzing
30. Schloß Lind
31. Lindau
32. Linz
  1. Aufräumungskommando
  2. Linz I
  3. Linz II
  4. Linz III
33. Loibl-Paß
  1. Nord
  2. Süd
34. Marialanzendorf
35. Mauthausen
  1. main camp
  2. Mauthausen Soviet prisoners of war camp
  3. Zeltlager Mauthausen (tent camp)
  4. Schiff — Donauhafen Mauthausen
36. Melk
37. Mistelbach am der Zaya
38. Schloß Mittersill (Zell am See)
39. Moosbierbaum
40. Passau
  1. Passau I (Oberilzmühle)
  2. Passau II (Waldwerke Passau-Ilzstadt)
  3. Passau III (Jandelsbrunn)
41. Peggau
42. Perg (Arbeitseinsatzstelle)
43. Rheydt
44. Ried
45. Schönbrunn
46. Schwechat
47. Steyr
48. St. Aegyd am Neuwalde
49. St. Lambrecht
  1. Frauenlager
  2. Männerlager
50. St. Valentin
51. Steyr-Münichholz
52. Ternberg
53. Vöcklabrück
  1. Vöcklabrück I
  2. Vöcklabrück II
54. Vöcklamarkt (Schlier Redl-Zipf)
55. Wagram
56. Wels
  1. Wels I
  2. Wels II
57. Weyer
58. Wien
  1. AFA-Werke
  2. Wien-Floridsdorf
  3. Wien-Floridsdorf II (Schwechat II)
  4. Wien-Floridsdorf III (Schwechat III)
  5. Wien-Heidfeld (Schwechat I)
  6. Wien-Hinterbrühl (Arbeitslager Haidfeld)
  7. Wien-Hinterbrühl (See Grotte)
  8. Wien-Jedlesee
  9. Wien-Maria-Lanzendorf
  10. Wien-Mödling
  11. Wien-Schönbrunn (Kraftfahrtechnische Lehranstalt)
  12. Wien-Schwechat ("Santa")
  13. Wien-West (Saurerwerke)
59. Wiener Neudorf
60. Wiener Neustadt
  1. Raxwerke GmbH (opened twice)

== See also ==
- List of Nazi concentration camps
- List of subcamps of Dachau, other extensive net of camps operating in Austria and southern Germany
