= Gusen (disambiguation) =

Gusen or Güsen may refer to:

- Gusen concentration camp, a complex of three different Nazi concentration camps in Upper Austria (Gusen I, Gusen II, Gusen III)
- Gusen (river), a river in Upper Austria
- Sankt Georgen an der Gusen, a small municipality in Upper Austria
- Gusen (Langenstein), a village in the municipality of Langenstein, Upper Austria
- Güsen, Saxony-Anhalt, a borough of Elbe-Parey in Saxony-Anhalt, Germany
