= Lungitz =

Coordinates: 48°17′N 14°29′E

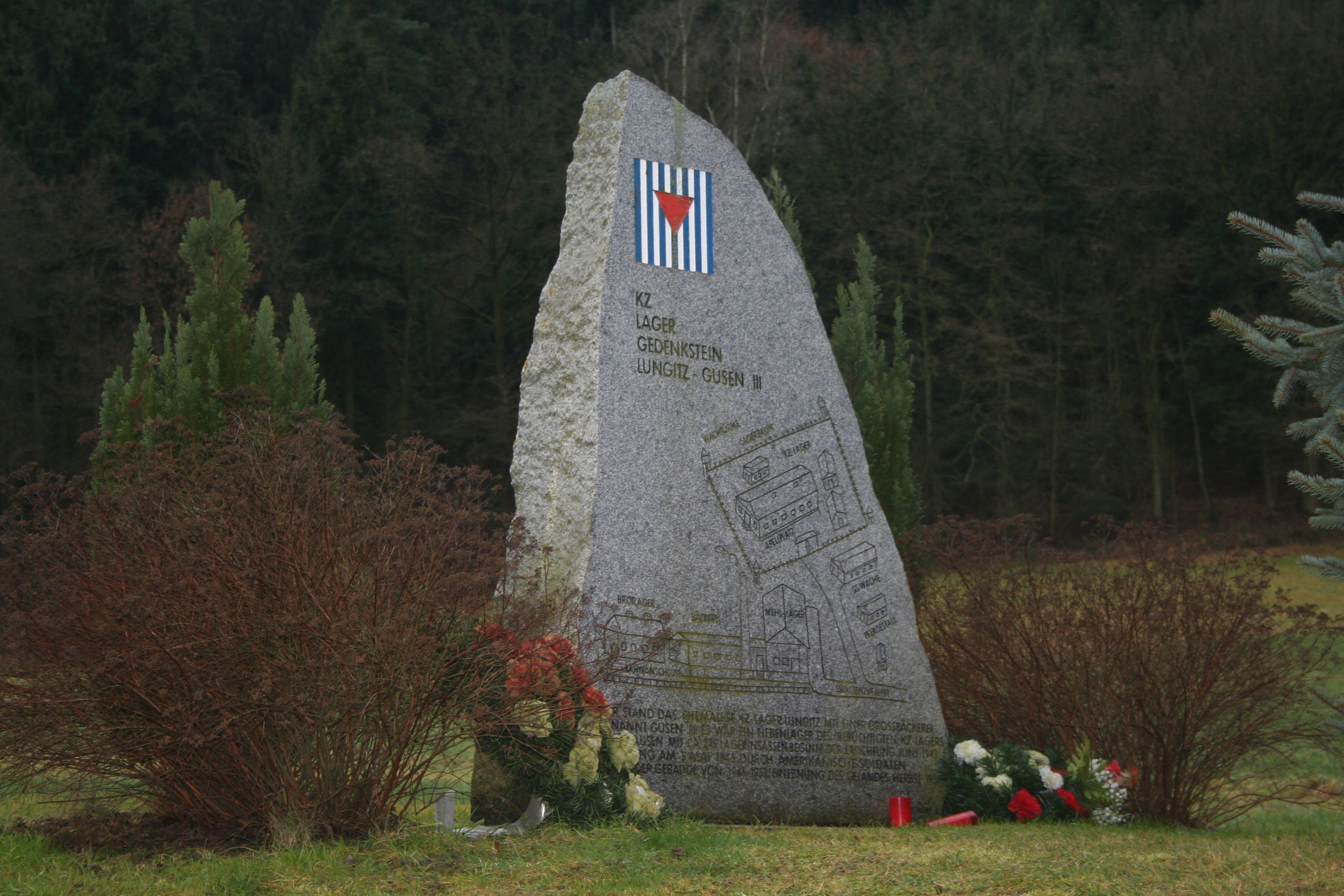

Lungitz is a village in the community of Katsdorf, Perg district of Upper Austria, Austria.

During World War II it was the site of slave labour and the "Gusen III" sub-camp of the Gusen concentration camp later on. Although camp Gusen III was not opened earlier than December 1944, inmates of camp Gusen worked in a brick production plant at Lungitz already in 1940. In this early period, these inmates drove by truck every day from Gusen via St. Georgen to Lungitz. With 1943 inmates of camp Gusen started the construction of a bakery for the Mauthausen-Gusen complex that only became operational in February 1945. In 1943 inmates of Gusen started also a warehouse for aircraft components in free halls of the brick production plant which were needed in the DEST joint-venture aircraft plants at St. Georgen and Gusen. Bakery and warehouse had full railway connection to the industrial park at St. Georgen and Gusen. Camp Gusen III was the first in a row of concentration camps that was liberated by Al Kosiek and his 23 men on May 5, 1945].
