= Windhaag =

Windhaag may refer to the following places in Austria:

- Windhaag bei Perg
- Windhaag bei Freistadt
