= Gießenbach =

Gießenbach may refer to:

- Gießenbach (Danube), a river of Austria, tributary of the Danube
- Gießenbach (Kieferbach), a river of Bavaria, Germany, tributary of the Kieferbach
- Gießenbach, a district of Scharnitz, a municipality in Tyrol, Austria
- Lohbach (Inn), a river of Austria, tributary of the Inn, a part of it is called Gießenbach

== See also ==
- Gessenbach, a river of Thuringia, Germany
