= Dimbach =

Dimbach may refer to:

- Dimbach, Germany
- Dimbach, Austria
