= Windhaag bei Perg =

- Municipality
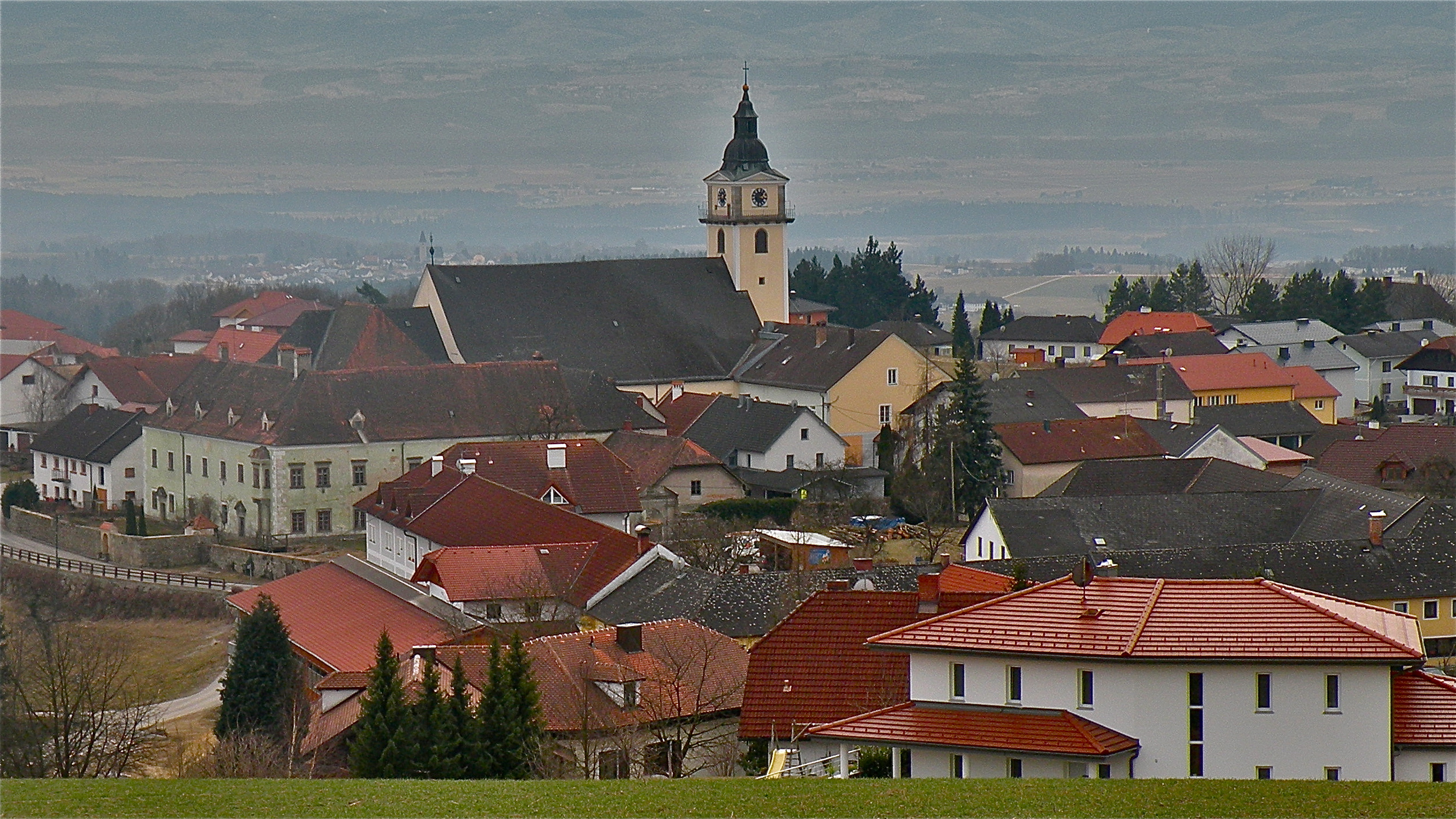

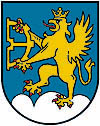
- Coat of arms

- Location within Austria
- Coordinates: 48°17′00″N 14°40′49″E
- Country: Austria
- State: Upper Austria
- District: Perg

Government
  - Mayor: Ignaz Knoll (ÖVP)

Area
  - Total: 19.18 km^{2} (7.41 sq mi)
- Elevation: 514 m (1,686 ft)

Population (2018-01-01)
  - Total: 1,508
  - Density: 78.62/km^{2} (203.6/sq mi)
- Time zone: UTC+1 (CET)
  - Summer (DST): UTC+2 (CEST)
- Postal code: 4322
- Area code: 07264
- Vehicle registration: PE
- Website: www.windhaag-perg.at

Windhaag bei Perg is a municipality in the district of Perg in the Austrian state of Upper Austria.

== Geography ==
Windhaag lies about 6 km north of Perg.

== Population ==
Historical population
Year	Pop.	±%
2005	1,412	—
2014	1,435	+1.6%
2015	1,447	+0.8%
