= Arbing =

- Municipality
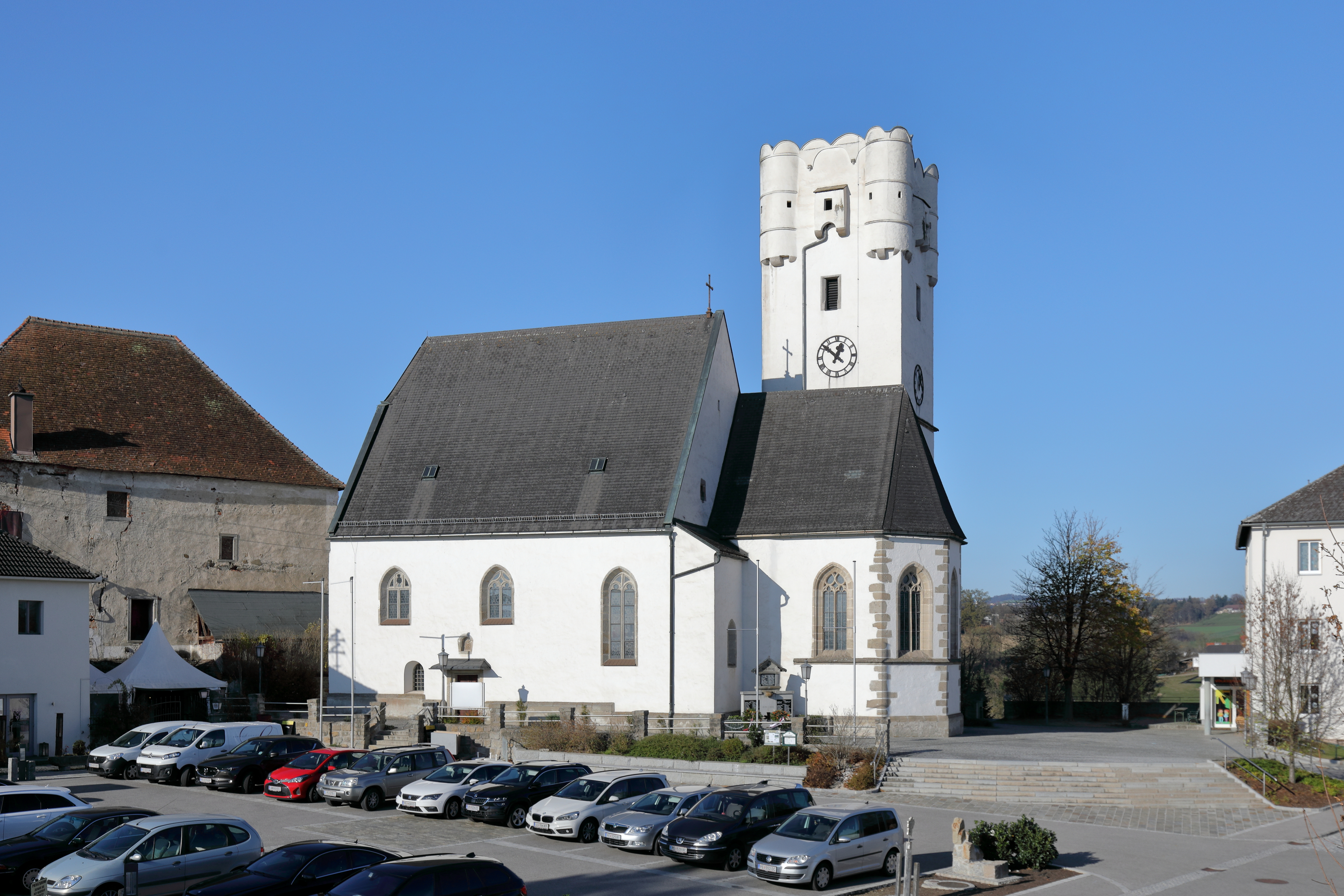

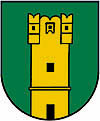
- Coat of arms

- Location within Austria
- Coordinates: 48°13′39″N 14°42′27″E
- Country: Austria
- State: Upper Austria
- District: Perg

Government
  - Mayor: Josef Hiesböck (ÖVP)

Area
  - Total: 12.02 km^{2} (4.64 sq mi)
- Elevation: 278 m (912 ft)

Population (2018-01-01)
  - Total: 1,446
  - Density: 120.3/km^{2} (311.6/sq mi)
- Time zone: UTC+1 (CET)
  - Summer (DST): UTC+2 (CEST)
- Postal code: 4341
- Area code: 07269
- Vehicle registration: PE
- Website: www.arbing.at

Arbing is a municipality in the district Perg in the Austrian state of Upper Austria.

== Geography ==
Arbing is located in the lower Mühlviertel at the transition from the fertile hills of the Mühlviertel Machlande level of the Danube. The extension is 4.4 kilometers from north to south, from west to east is also 4.4 kilometers. The total area is 12 square kilometers. 17.5 percent of the area is forested, 71.7 percent of the area are used for agriculture. Quarters are: Arbing, Frühstorf, Groißing, Hummelberg, Puchberg in Machland, Roisenberg. Some parts of other villages also belong to the municipality Arbing (Mollnegg, Hehenberger)

== Population ==
Historical population
Year	Pop.	±%
1869	950	—
1880	983	+3.5%
1890	997	+1.4%
1900	943	−5.4%
1910	948	+0.5%
1923	941	−0.7%
1934	896	−4.8%
1939	1,082	+20.8%
1951	910	−15.9%
1961	987	+8.5%
1971	1,073	+8.7%
1981	1,149	+7.1%
1991	1,269	+10.4%
2001	1,284	+1.2%
2009	1,374	+7.0%
2015	1,397	+1.7%
