= Rechberg, Austria =

Rechberg
- Municipality
- Coat of arms

- Location within Austria
- Coordinates: 48°19′19″N 14°42′44″E
- Country: Austria
- State: Upper Austria
- District: Perg

Government
  - Mayor: Martin Ebenhofer (ÖVP)

Area
  - Total: 13.77 km^{2} (5.32 sq mi)
- Elevation: 576 m (1,890 ft)

Population (2018-01-01)
  - Total: 996
  - Density: 72.3/km^{2} (187/sq mi)
- Time zone: UTC+1 (CET)
  - Summer (DST): UTC+2 (CEST)
- Postal code: 4324
- Area code: 07264
- Vehicle registration: PE
- Website: www.rechberg.at

Rechberg is a municipality in the district of Perg in the Austrian state of Upper Austria.

== Population ==
Historical population
Year	Pop.	±%
1869	594	—
1880	607	+2.2%
1890	577	−4.9%
1900	583	+1.0%
1910	581	−0.3%
1923	593	+2.1%
1934	580	−2.2%
1939	553	−4.7%
1951	521	−5.8%
1961	603	+15.7%
1971	650	+7.8%
1981	649	−0.2%
1991	781	+20.3%
2001	877	+12.3%
2009	931	+6.2%
2015	948	+1.8%
