= Allerheiligen im Mühlkreis =

- Municipality
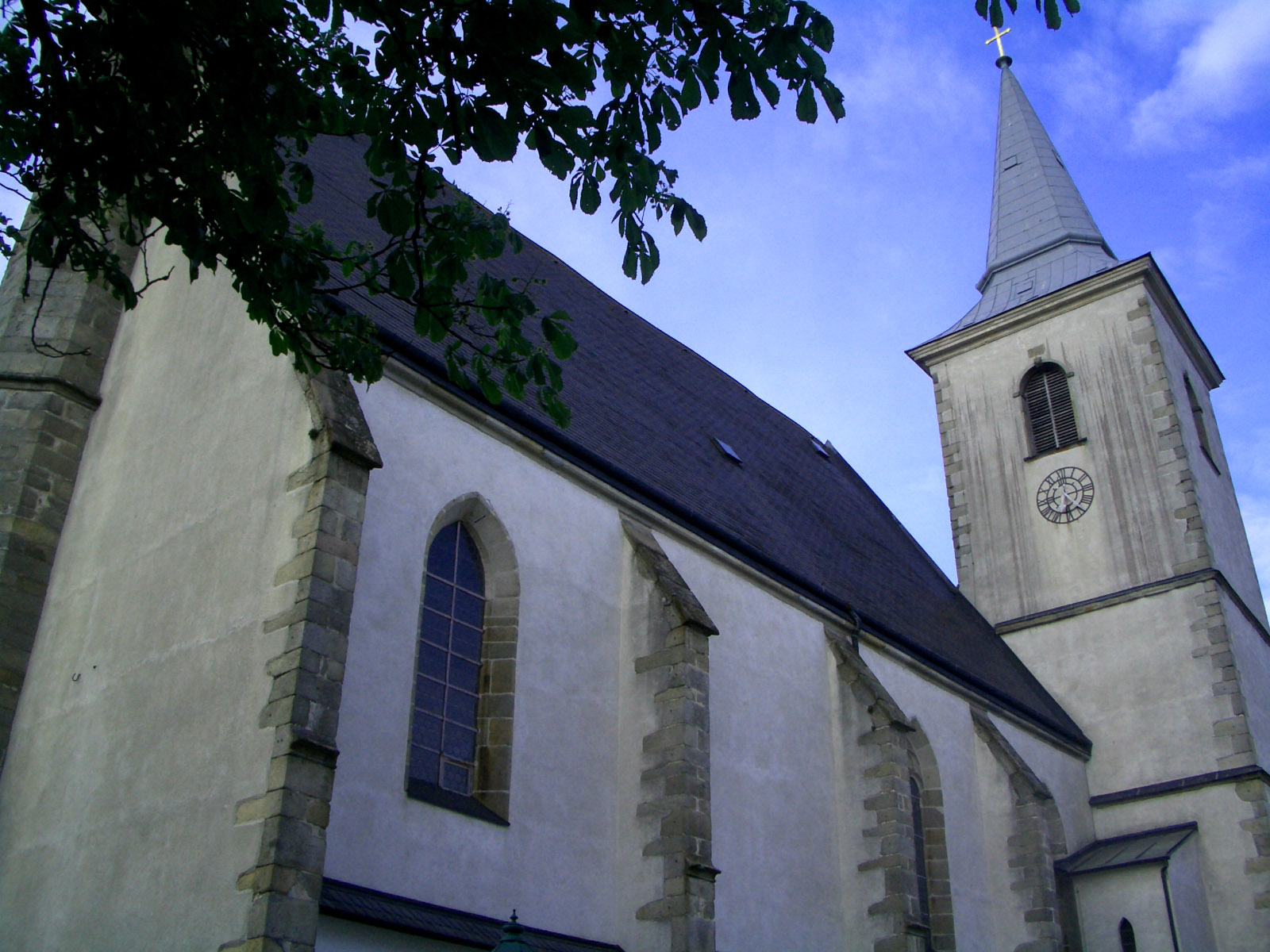

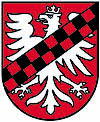
- Coat of arms

- Location within Austria
- Coordinates: 48°18′01″N 14°38′01″E
- Country: Austria
- State: Upper Austria
- District: Perg

Government
  - Mayor: Berthold Baumgartner (ÖVP)

Area
  - Total: 20.2 km^{2} (7.8 sq mi)
- Elevation: 568 m (1,864 ft)

Population (2018-01-01)
  - Total: 1,261
  - Density: 62.4/km^{2} (162/sq mi)
- Time zone: UTC+1 (CET)
  - Summer (DST): UTC+2 (CEST)
- Postal code: 4320
- Area code: 07262
- Vehicle registration: PE
- Website: www.allerheiligen. ooe.gv.at

Allerheiligen im Mühlkreis is a municipality in the district of Perg in the Austrian state of Upper Austria. It is not to be confused with the Styrian municipality of Allerheiligen bei Wildon.

== Population ==
Historical population
Year	Pop.	±%
1869	938	—
1880	917	−2.2%
1890	934	+1.9%
1900	1,017	+8.9%
1910	1,025	+0.8%
1923	987	−3.7%
1934	1,076	+9.0%
1939	973	−9.6%
1951	1,025	+5.3%
1961	1,049	+2.3%
1971	988	−5.8%
1981	1,054	+6.7%
1991	1,103	+4.6%
2001	1,099	−0.4%
2009	1,173	+6.7%
2015	1,214	+3.5%
