= Münzbach =

- Municipality
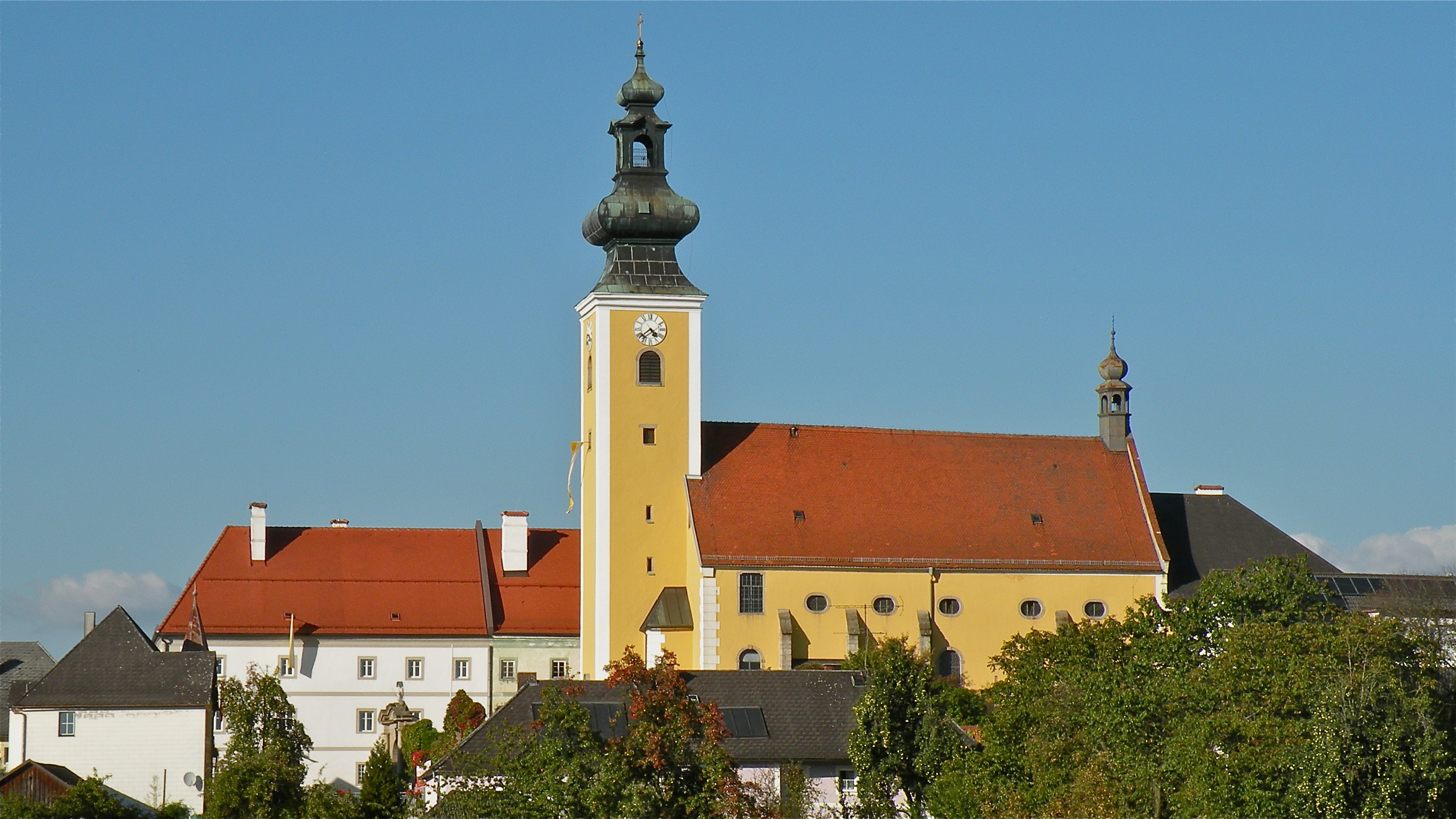

- Coat of arms

- Location within Austria
- Coordinates: 48°16′01″N 14°42′56″E
- Country: Austria
- State: Upper Austria
- District: Perg

Government
  - Mayor: Josef Bindreiter (ÖVP)

Area
  - Total: 24.89 km^{2} (9.61 sq mi)
- Elevation: 421 m (1,381 ft)

Population (2018-01-01)
  - Total: 1,814
  - Density: 72.88/km^{2} (188.8/sq mi)
- Time zone: UTC+1 (CET)
  - Summer (DST): UTC+2 (CEST)
- Postal code: 4323
- Area code: 07264
- Vehicle registration: PE
- Website: www.muenzbach.at

Münzbach (German pronunciation: [ˈmʏntsbax]) is a municipality in the district of Perg in the Austrian state of Upper Austria.

== Population ==
Historical population
Year	Pop.	±%
1869	1,435	—
1880	1,547	+7.8%
1890	1,432	−7.4%
1900	1,458	+1.8%
1910	1,480	+1.5%
1923	1,416	−4.3%
1934	1,419	+0.2%
1939	1,316	−7.3%
1951	1,336	+1.5%
1961	1,351	+1.1%
1971	1,444	+6.9%
1981	1,479	+2.4%
1991	1,511	+2.2%
2001	1,699	+12.4%
2009	1,728	+1.7%
2015	1,726	−0.1%
