= Sankt Thomas am Blasenstein =

- Municipality
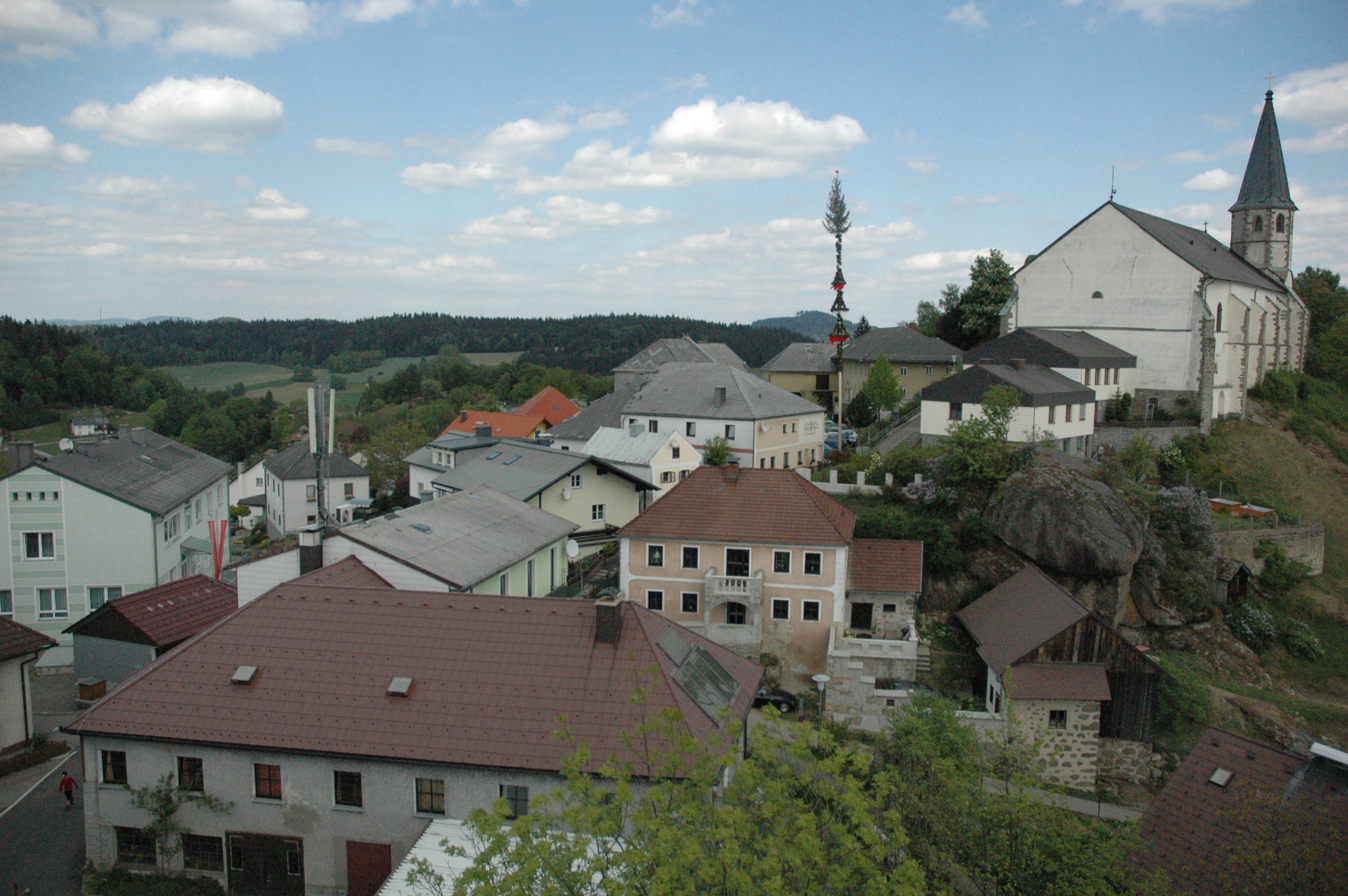

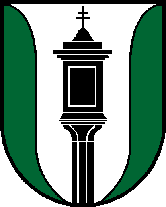
- Coat of arms

- Location within Austria
- Coordinates: 48°18′47″N 14°45′49″E
- Country: Austria
- State: Upper Austria
- District: Perg

Government
  - Mayor: Michael Naderer (ÖVP)

Area
  - Total: 29.04 km^{2} (11.21 sq mi)
- Elevation: 723 m (2,372 ft)

Population (2018-01-01)
  - Total: 927
  - Density: 31.9/km^{2} (82.7/sq mi)
- Time zone: UTC+1 (CET)
  - Summer (DST): UTC+2 (CEST)
- Postal code: 4364
- Area code: 07265
- Vehicle registration: PE
- Website: www.st-thomas.at

Sankt Thomas am Blasenstein (also St. Thomas am Blasenstein) is a municipality in the district of Perg in the Austrian state of Upper Austria.

== Population ==
Historical population
Year	Pop.	±%
1869	1,190	—
1880	1,206	+1.3%
1890	1,120	−7.1%
1900	1,148	+2.5%
1910	1,176	+2.4%
1923	1,142	−2.9%
1934	1,096	−4.0%
1939	1,073	−2.1%
1951	1,030	−4.0%
1961	1,007	−2.2%
1971	947	−6.0%
1981	1,005	+6.1%
1991	911	−9.4%
2001	876	−3.8%
2011	930	+6.2%
2015	917	−1.4%
