= Saxen =

- Municipality
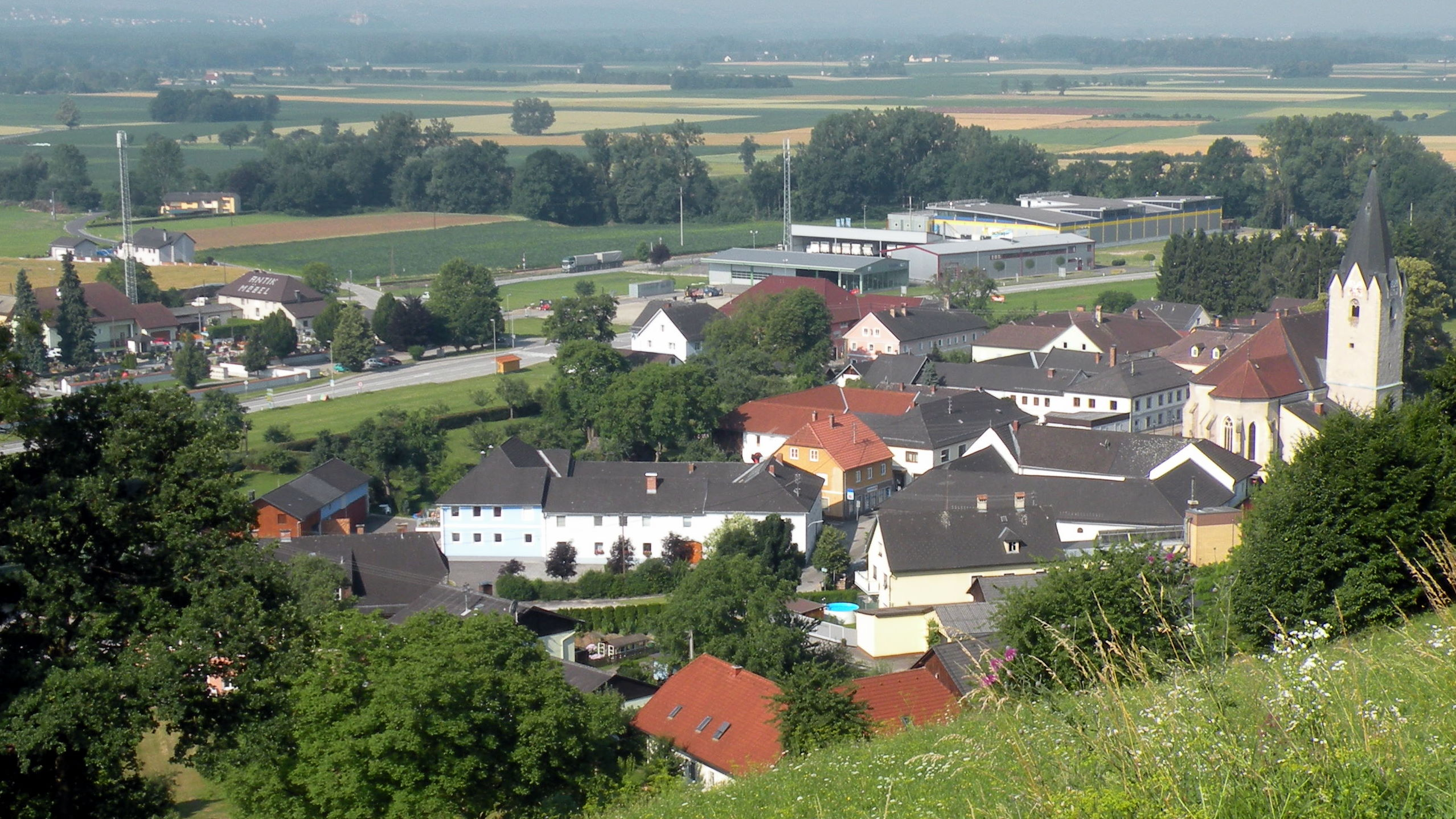

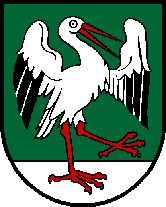
- Coat of arms

- Location within Austria
- Coordinates: 48°12′21″N 14°47′29″E
- Country: Austria
- State: Upper Austria
- District: Perg

Government
  - Mayor: Erwin Neubauer (SPÖ)

Area
  - Total: 19.07 km^{2} (7.36 sq mi)
- Elevation: 242 m (794 ft)

Population (2018-01-01)
  - Total: 1,820
  - Density: 95.4/km^{2} (247/sq mi)
- Time zone: UTC+1 (CET)
  - Summer (DST): UTC+2 (CEST)
- Postal code: 4351
- Area code: 07269
- Vehicle registration: PE
- Website: www.saxen.at

Saxen is a municipality in the district of Perg in the Austrian state of Upper Austria.

== Geography ==
Saxen lies in the eastern Machland on the Danube. About 24 percent of the municipality is forest, and 58 percent is farmland.

== Population ==
Historical population
Year	Pop.	±%
2005	1,739	—
2014	1,758	+1.1%
2015	1,774	+0.9%
2022	1,723	−2.9%
