= Sankt Georgen am Walde =

- Municipality
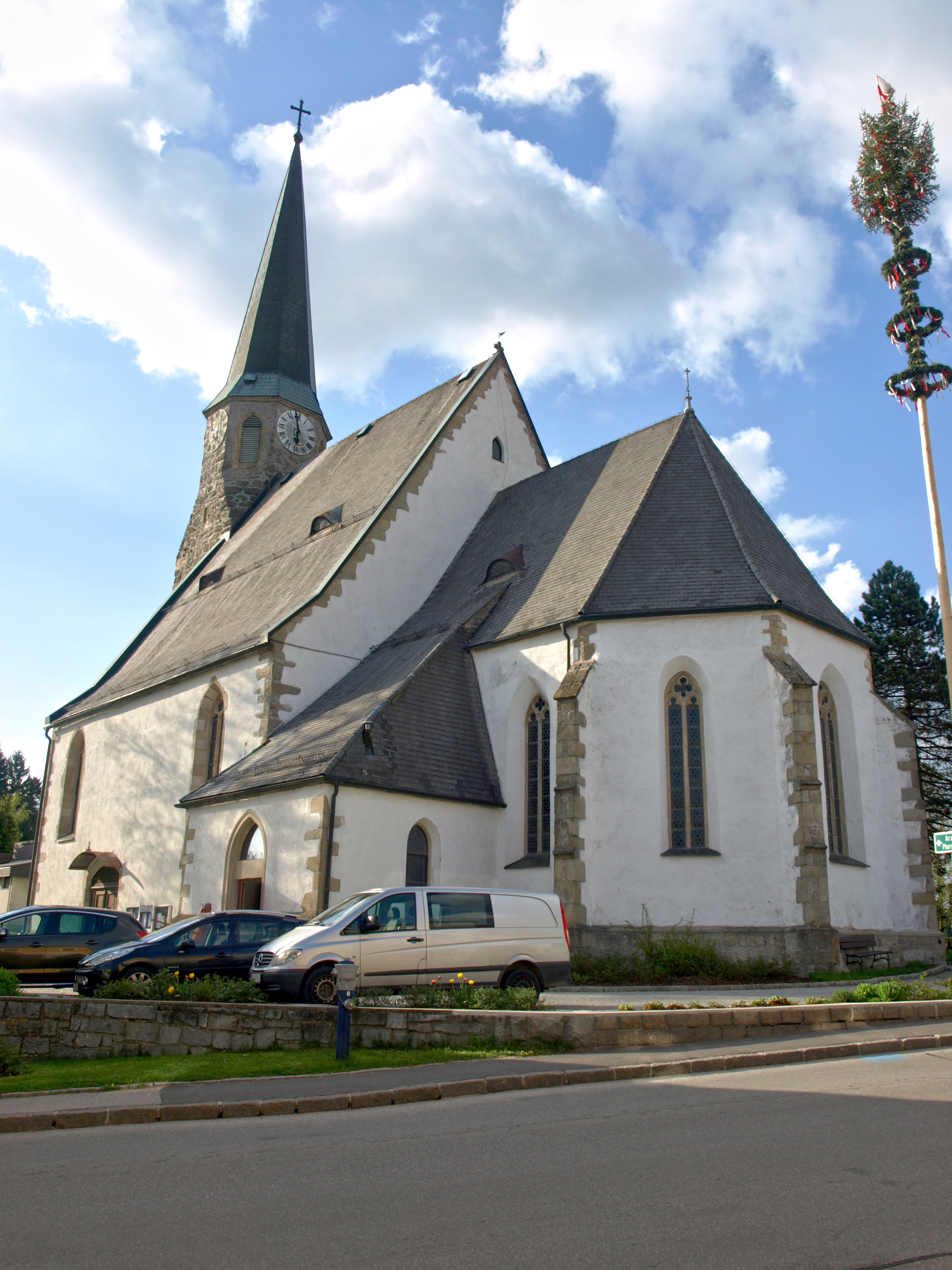

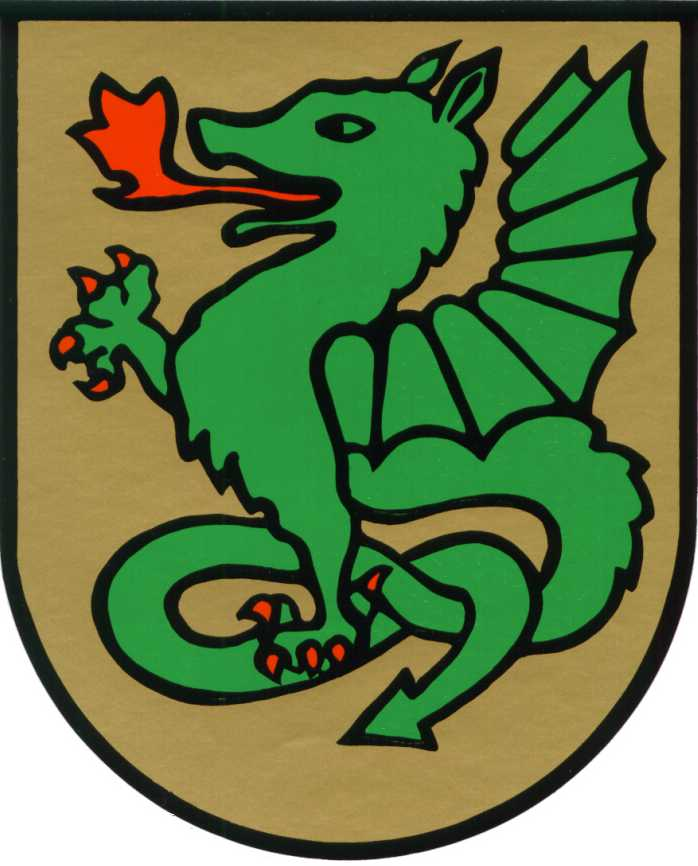
- Coat of arms

- Location within Austria
- Coordinates: 48°21′39″N 14°53′49″E
- Country: Austria
- State: Upper Austria
- District: Perg

Government
  - Mayor: Leopold Buchberger (SPÖ)

Area
  - Total: 53.55 km^{2} (20.68 sq mi)
- Elevation: 787 m (2,582 ft)

Population (2018-01-01)
  - Total: 2,006
  - Density: 37.46/km^{2} (97.02/sq mi)
- Time zone: UTC+1 (CET)
  - Summer (DST): UTC+2 (CEST)
- Postal code: 4372
- Area code: 07954
- Vehicle registration: PE
- Website: www.st.georgen.at

Sankt Georgen am Walde (also St. Georgen am Walde) is a municipality in the district of Perg in the Austrian state of Upper Austria.

== Geography ==
Sankt Georgen lies in the Mühlviertel. About 52 percent of the municipality is forest, and 45 percent is farmland.

== Population ==
Historical population
Year	Pop.	±%
2005	2,148	—
2014	2,077	−3.3%
2015	3,779	+81.9%
