= Baumgartenberg =

- Municipality
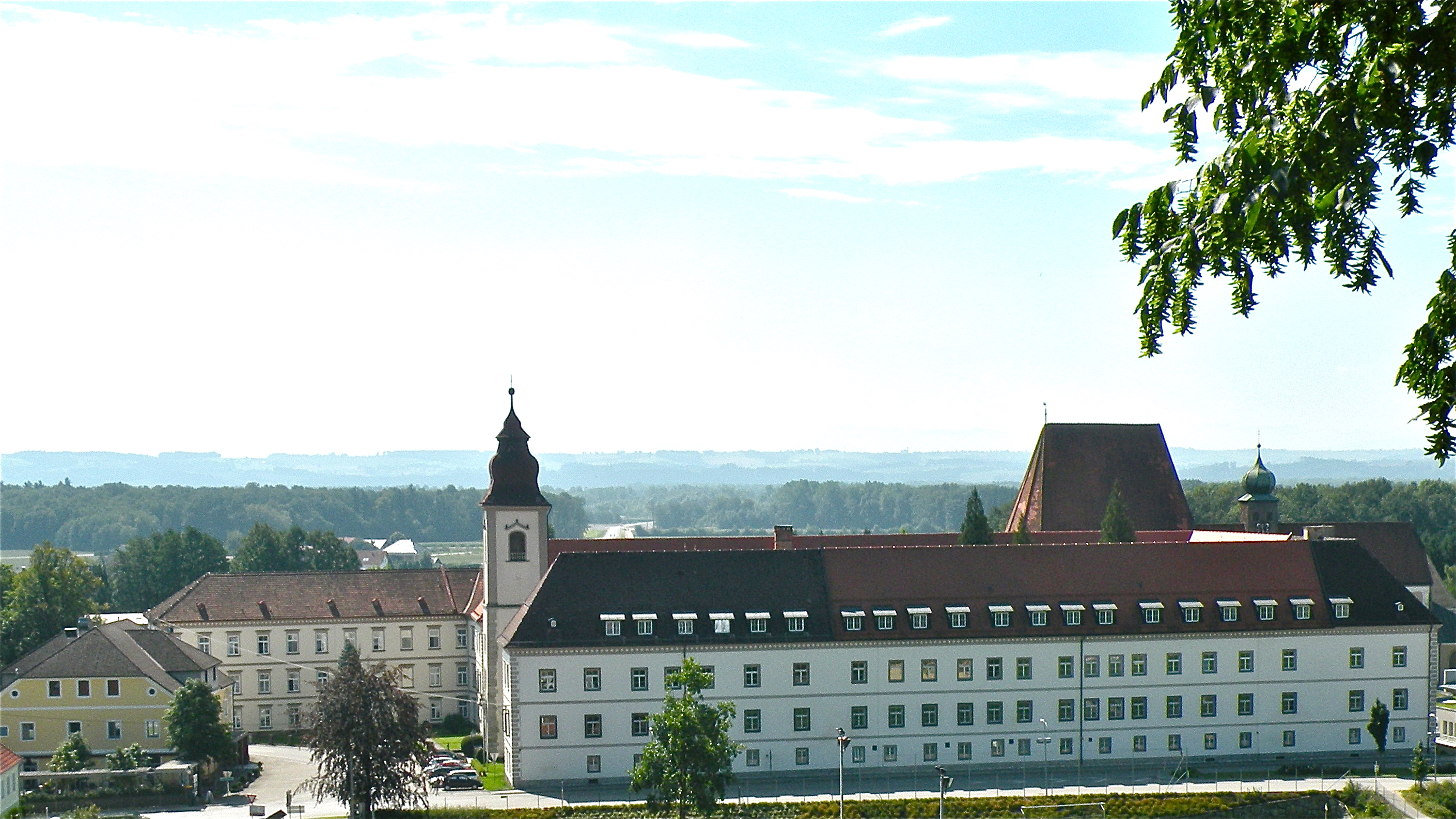
- Monastery

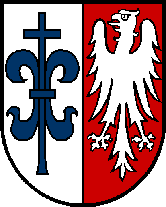
- Coat of arms

- Location within Austria
- Coordinates: 48°12′32″N 14°44′39″E
- Country: Austria
- State: Upper Austria
- District: Perg

Government
  - Mayor: Gerhard Fornwagner (2021) (ÖVP)

Area
  - Total: 15.73 km^{2} (6.07 sq mi)
- Elevation: 237 m (778 ft)
- Highest elevation: 240 m (790 ft)
- Lowest elevation: 230 m (750 ft)

Population (2018-01-01)
  - Total: 1,734
  - Density: 110.2/km^{2} (285.5/sq mi)
- Time zone: UTC+1 (CET)
  - Summer (DST): UTC+2 (CEST)
- Postal code: 4342
- Area code: 07269
- Vehicle registration: PE
- Website: www.baumgartenberg.at

Baumgartenberg is a municipality in the district Perg in the Austrian state of Upper Austria.

== Geography ==
Baumgartenberg lies at round 237 meters. The extension is 4.5 kilometers from north to south, from west to east 6.8 kilometers. The total area is 15.7 kilometers ². 23.6% of the area is forested, 63.7% of the area is used for agriculture.

Quarters include Amesbach, Au, Baumgartenberg, Deiming, Hehenberger, High, Kolbinger, Kühofen, Fiefs, Mettensdorf, Muhlberg, Obergassolding, Pitzing, Schneckenreit, Steindl and Untergassolding.

== Population ==
Historical population
Year	Pop.	±%
1869	1,227	—
1880	1,336	+8.9%
1890	1,391	+4.1%
1900	1,519	+9.2%
1910	1,399	−7.9%
1923	1,385	−1.0%
1934	1,429	+3.2%
1939	1,364	−4.5%
1951	1,165	−14.6%
1961	1,121	−3.8%
1971	1,295	+15.5%
1981	1,402	+8.3%
1991	1,442	+2.9%
2001	1,399	−3.0%
2009	1,548	+10.7%
2015	1,696	+9.6%
2021	1,798	+6.0%
