= Luftenberg an der Donau =

- Municipality
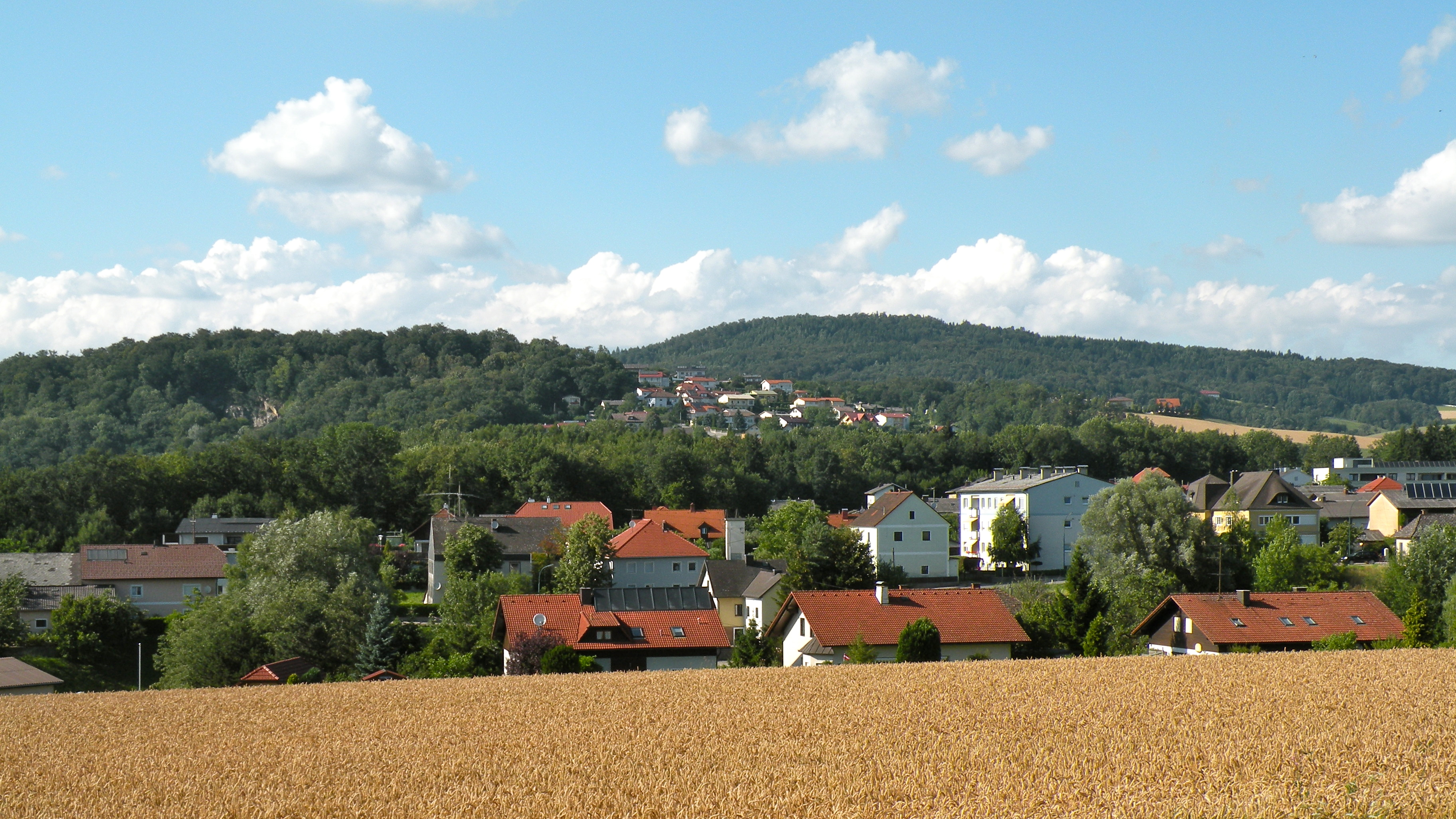

- Coat of arms

- Location within Austria
- Coordinates: 48°16′32″N 14°25′45″E
- Country: Austria
- State: Upper Austria
- District: Perg

Government
  - Mayor: Prandner Hilde (SPÖ)

Area
  - Total: 16.86 km^{2} (6.51 sq mi)
- Elevation: 295 m (968 ft)

Population (2018-01-01)
  - Total: 4,057
  - Density: 240.6/km^{2} (623.2/sq mi)
- Time zone: UTC+1 (CET)
  - Summer (DST): UTC+2 (CEST)
- Postal code: 4225
- Area code: 07237
- Vehicle registration: PE
- Website: www.luftenberg.at

Luftenberg an der Donau is a municipality and small market town in the district of Perg in the Austrian state of Upper Austria. As of 2015, the town had 3,979 inhabitants.

== Population ==
Historical population
Year	Pop.	±%
1869	1,101	—
1880	1,142	+3.7%
1890	1,072	−6.1%
1900	1,082	+0.9%
1910	1,133	+4.7%
1923	1,174	+3.6%
1934	1,190	+1.4%
1939	1,205	+1.3%
1951	1,255	+4.1%
1961	1,615	+28.7%
1971	2,543	+57.5%
1981	3,079	+21.1%
1991	3,283	+6.6%
2001	3,665	+11.6%
2010	3,848	+5.0%
2013	3,856	+0.2%
2015	3,979	+3.2%
