= Burg Neuhaus =

Castle in Austria

Coordinates: 48°25′23″N 13°59′28″E

- Upper Austria, Austria
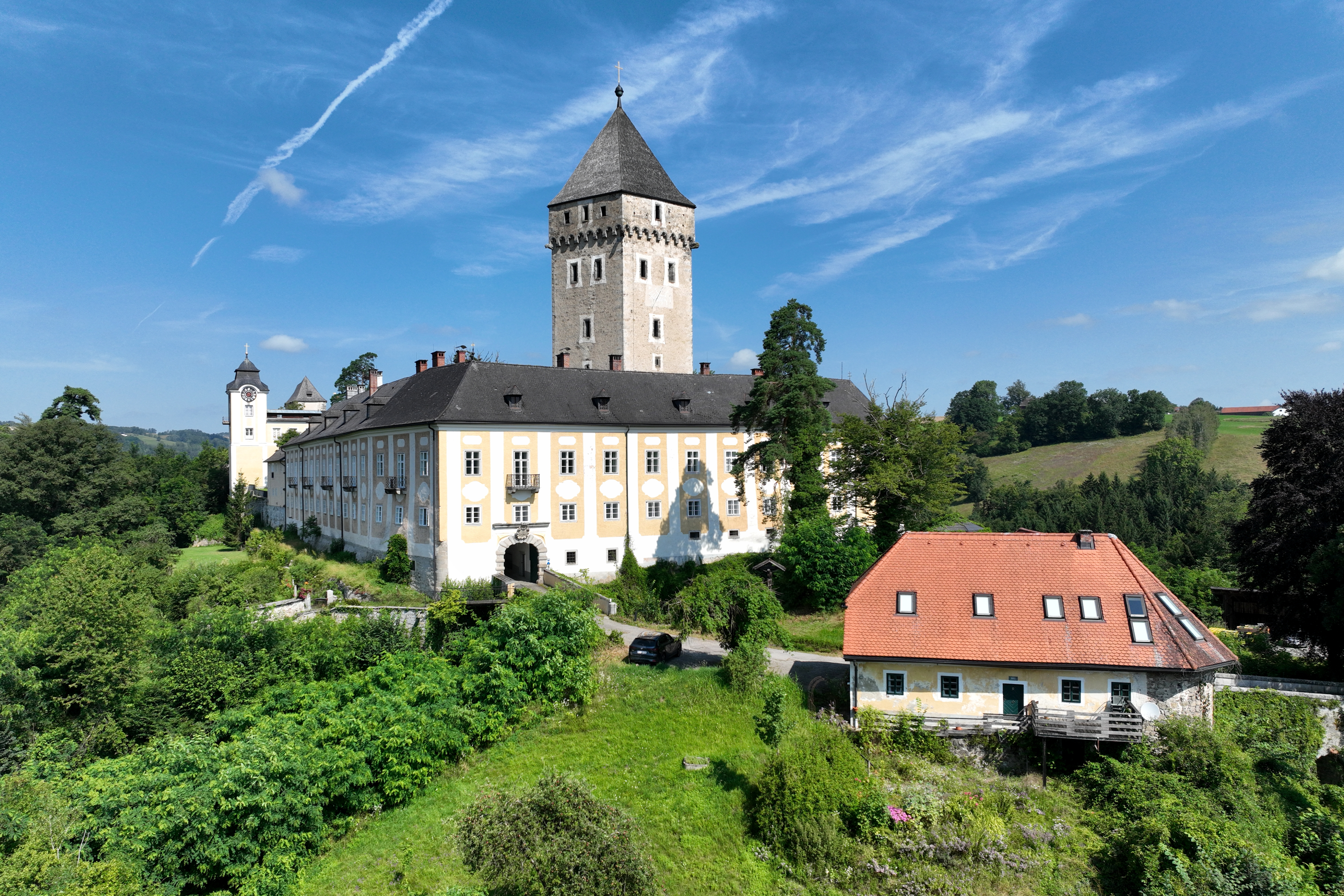
- South-southeast view of Neuhaus Castle

Site history
- Built: 13th century

Burg Neuhaus is a castle in Upper Austria, Austria. Burg Neuhaus is 420 metres (1,380 ft) above sea level.

== See also ==
- List of castles in Austria
