= Klam =

- Municipality
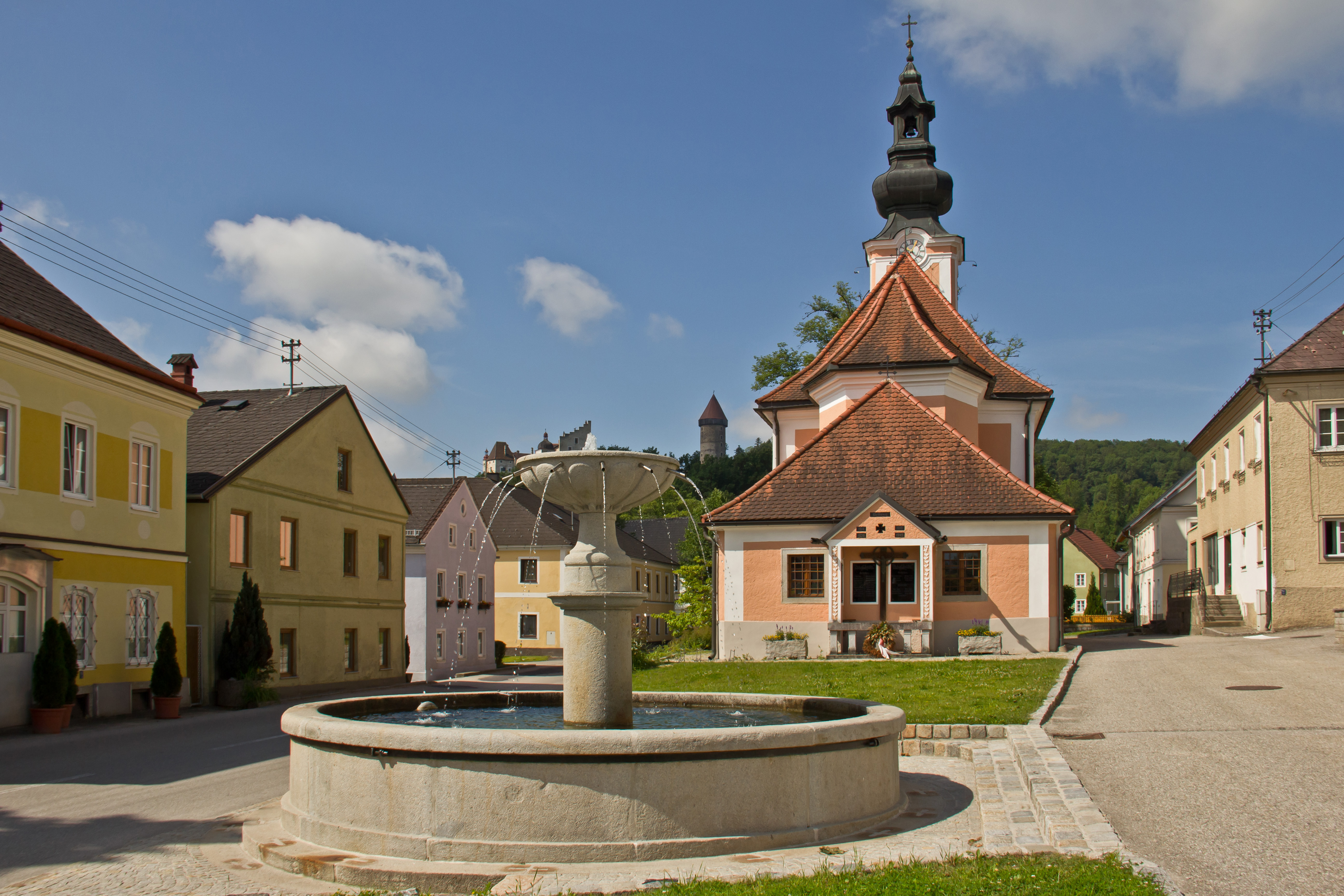

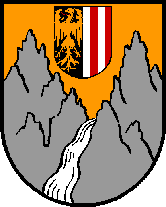
- Coat of arms

- Location within Austria
- Coordinates: 48°13′29″N 14°47′00″E
- Country: Austria
- State: Upper Austria
- District: Perg

Government
  - Mayor: Johannes Achleitner (ÖVP)

Area
  - Total: 8.36 km^{2} (3.23 sq mi)
- Elevation: 284 m (932 ft)

Population (2018-01-01)
  - Total: 918
  - Density: 110/km^{2} (284/sq mi)
- Time zone: UTC+1 (CET)
  - Summer (DST): UTC+2 (CEST)
- Postal code: 4352
- Area code: 07269
- Vehicle registration: PE
- Website: www.klam.at

Klam is a municipality in the district Perg in the Austrian state of Upper Austria.

== Population ==
Historical population
Year	Pop.	±%
1869	739	—
1880	770	+4.2%
1890	770	+0.0%
1900	705	−8.4%
1910	645	−8.5%
1923	681	+5.6%
1934	663	−2.6%
1939	628	−5.3%
1951	614	−2.2%
1961	633	+3.1%
1971	644	+1.7%
1981	662	+2.8%
1991	736	+11.2%
2001	789	+7.2%
2011	931	+18.0%
2015	892	−4.2%
