= Mitterkirchen im Machland =

- Municipality
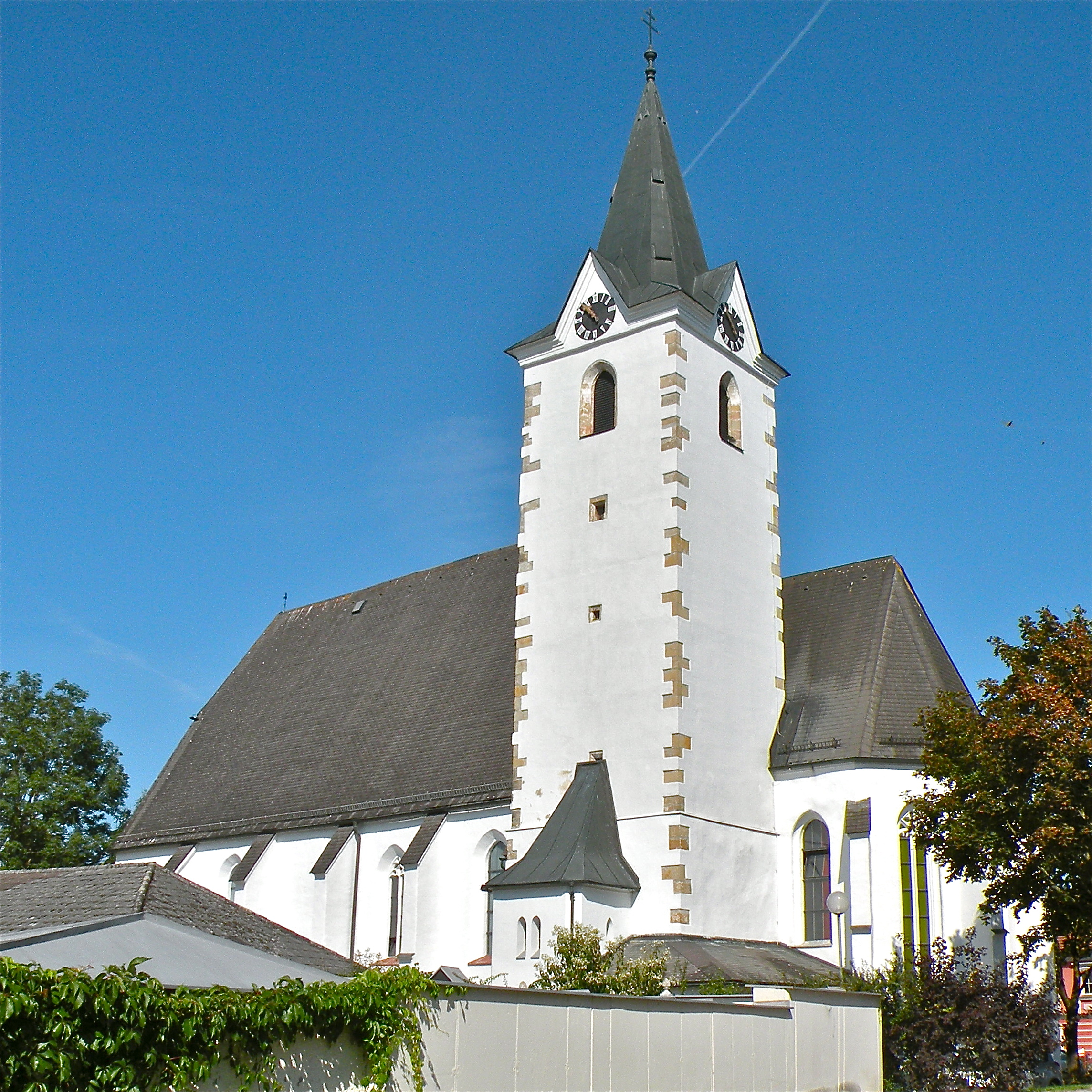

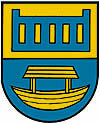
- Coat of arms

- Location within Austria
- Coordinates: 48°11′01″N 14°42′34″E
- Country: Austria
- State: Upper Austria
- District: Perg

Government
  - Mayor: Anton Aichinger (SPÖ)

Area
  - Total: 28.93 km^{2} (11.17 sq mi)
- Elevation: 235 m (771 ft)

Population (2018-01-01)
  - Total: 1,718
  - Density: 59.38/km^{2} (153.8/sq mi)
- Time zone: UTC+1 (CET)
  - Summer (DST): UTC+2 (CEST)
- Postal code: 4343
- Area code: 07269
- Vehicle registration: PE
- Website: www.mitterkirchen.at

Mitterkirchen im Machland is a municipality in the district of Perg in the Austrian state of Upper Austria.

== Population ==
Historical population
Year	Pop.	±%
1869	1,430	—
1880	1,442	+0.8%
1890	1,435	−0.5%
1900	1,483	+3.3%
1910	1,469	−0.9%
1923	1,499	+2.0%
1934	1,509	+0.7%
1939	1,579	+4.6%
1951	1,498	−5.1%
1961	1,505	+0.5%
1971	1,533	+1.9%
1981	1,617	+5.5%
1991	1,775	+9.8%
2001	1,793	+1.0%
2009	1,695	−5.5%
2015	1,728	+1.9%
