= Naarn im Machlande =

- Municipality
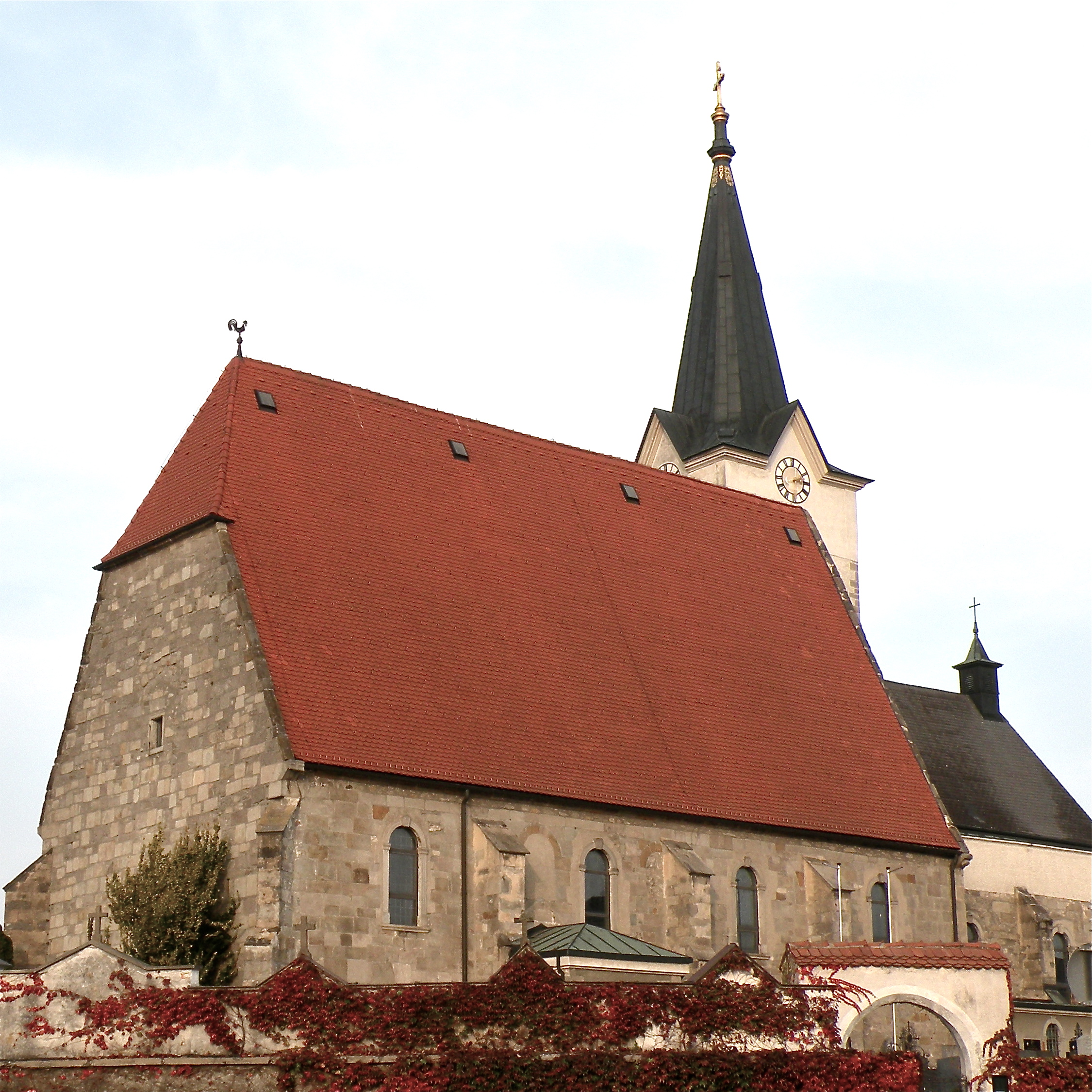

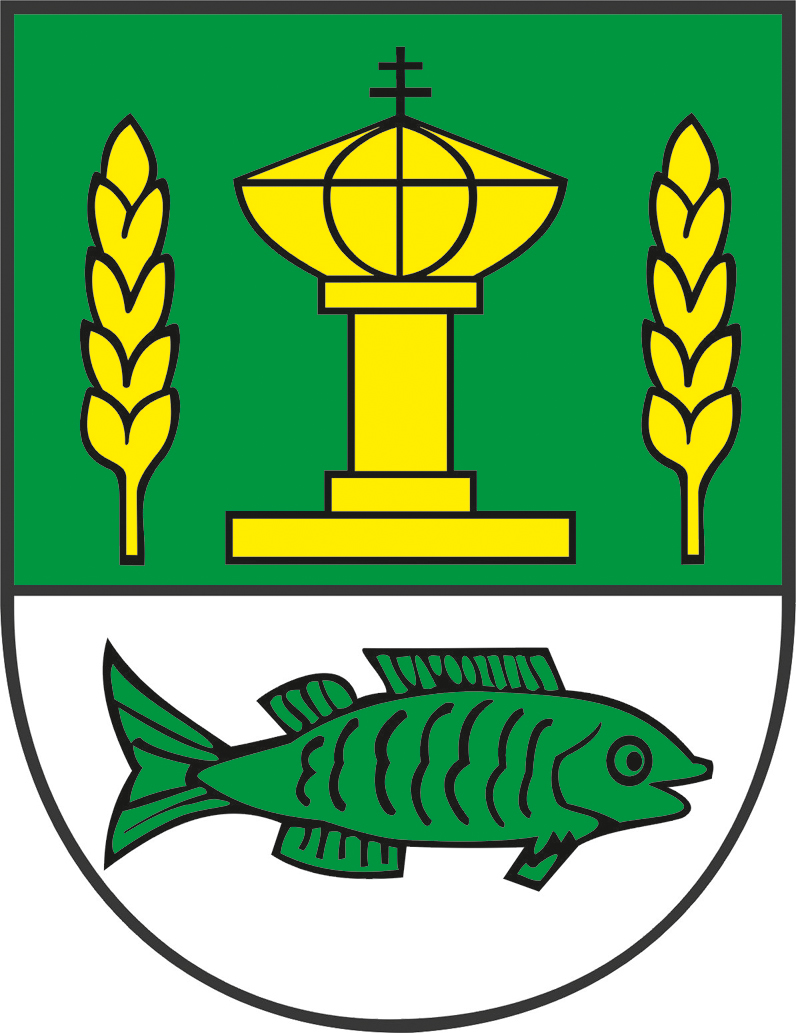
- Coat of arms

- Location within Austria
- Coordinates: 48°13′36″N 14°36′32″E
- Country: Austria
- State: Upper Austria
- District: Perg

Government
  - Mayor: Rupert Wahlmüller (SPÖ)

Area
  - Total: 35.17 km^{2} (13.58 sq mi)
- Elevation: 245 m (804 ft)

Population (2018-01-01)
  - Total: 3,690
  - Density: 105/km^{2} (272/sq mi)
- Time zone: UTC+1 (CET)
  - Summer (DST): UTC+2 (CEST)
- Postal code: 4331
- Area code: 07262
- Vehicle registration: PE
- Website: www.naarn.at

Naarn im Machlande is a municipality in the district of Perg in the Austrian state of Upper Austria.

== Population ==
Historical population
Year	Pop.	±%
1869	2,150	—
1880	2,215	+3.0%
1890	2,220	+0.2%
1900	2,275	+2.5%
1910	2,283	+0.4%
1923	2,257	−1.1%
1934	2,368	+4.9%
1939	2,383	+0.6%
1951	2,338	−1.9%
1961	2,440	+4.4%
1971	2,768	+13.4%
1981	2,973	+7.4%
1991	3,077	+3.5%
2001	3,311	+7.6%
2015	3,591	+8.5%
