= Sankt Georgen an der Gusen =

Town in Upper Austria, Austria

- Municipality
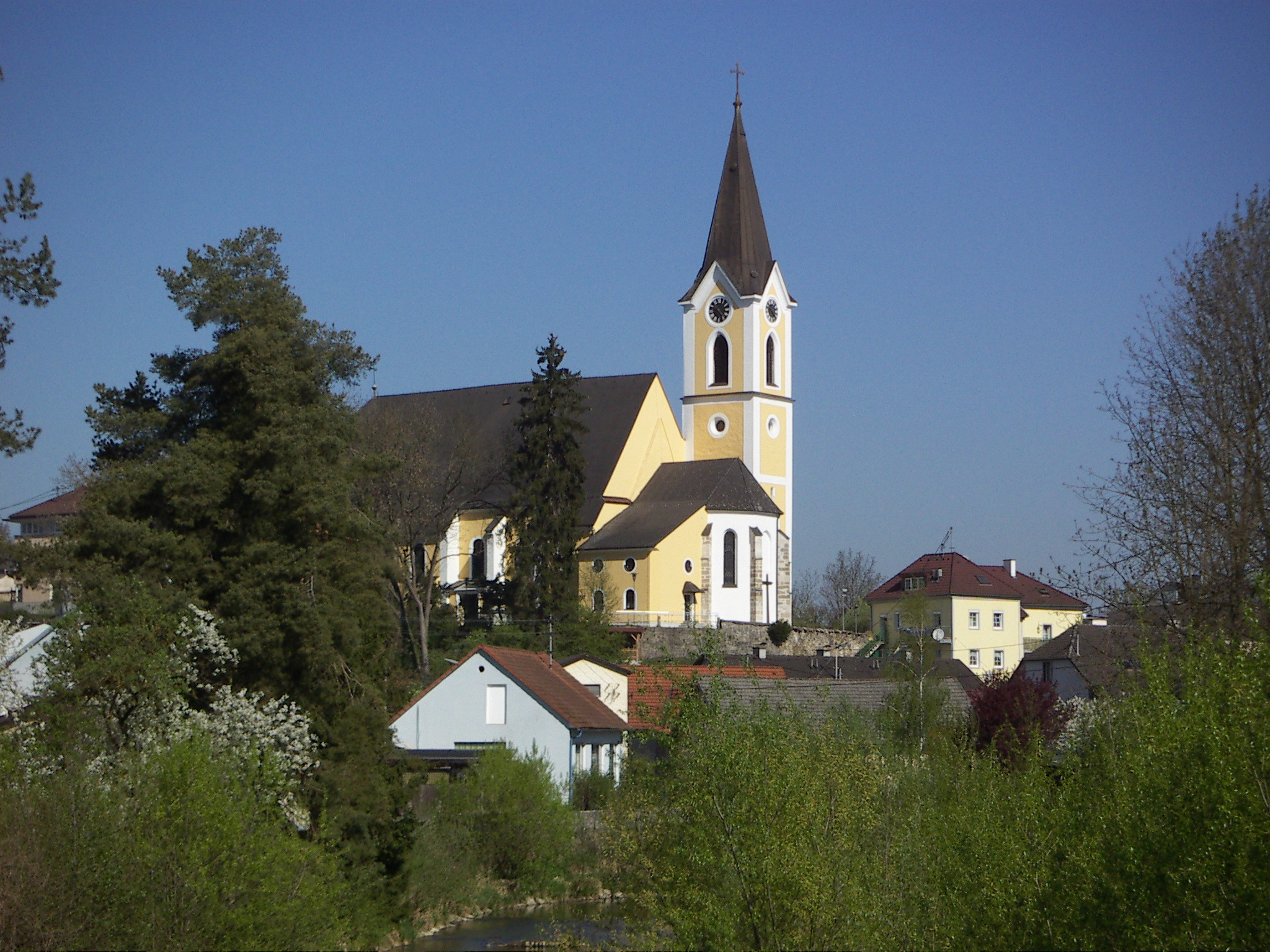

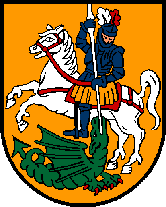
- Coat of arms

- Location within Austria
- Coordinates: 48°16′18″N 14°26′54″E
- Country: Austria
- State: Upper Austria
- District: Perg

Government
  - Mayor: Andreas Derntl (ÖVP)

Area
  - Total: 7.12 km^{2} (2.75 sq mi)
- Elevation: 262 m (860 ft)

Population (2018-01-01)
  - Total: 4,119
  - Density: 579/km^{2} (1,500/sq mi)
- Time zone: UTC+1 (CET)
  - Summer (DST): UTC+2 (CEST)
- Postal code: 4222, 4223
- Area code: 07237
- Vehicle registration: PE
- Website: www.st-georgen-gusen.at

Sankt Georgen an der Gusen (also St. Georgen an der Gusen and St. Georgen/Gusen; lit.: "Saint George's town on the Gusen River") is a small market town in Upper Austria, Austria, between the municipalities of Luftenberg and Langenstein. As of 2015, the town had 3,779 inhabitants.

== History ==
The town traces back to the 1600s, descendants of settlers like the Stettner and Hödlmayr families moving southwest near Perg and throughout Upper Austria.

During World War II the town was selected to be the DEST-business administration center for exploiting slave labour in the quarries and later the industries of the Gusen concentration camp, a subcamp of the nearby Mauthausen concentration camp. In early 1944 the town became the site of "Gusen II", the most brutal sub-camp of Mauthausen. In roughly 40,000 m^{2} of tunnels and caverns dug beneath St. Georgen for the Messerschmitt company a huge and most modern underground assembly plant for Messerschmitt Me 262 fuselages was operated until May 1945 under the code-name B8 Bergkristall - Esche II.

In some trials of the Nuremberg Military Tribunal the relatively unknown term St. Georgen granite works was used to prevent the use of locations like Mauthausen or Gusen.

== Population ==
Historical population
Year	Pop.	±%
1869	1,089	—
1880	1,128	+3.6%
1890	1,129	+0.1%
1900	1,326	+17.4%
1910	1,434	+8.1%
1923	1,324	−7.7%
1934	1,396	+5.4%
1939	1,429	+2.4%
1951	1,795	+25.6%
1961	2,148	+19.7%
1971	2,805	+30.6%
1981	3,093	+10.3%
1991	3,236	+4.6%
2001	3,529	+9.1%
2010	3,619	+2.6%
2015	3,779	+4.4%
