= Pabneukirchen =

- Municipality
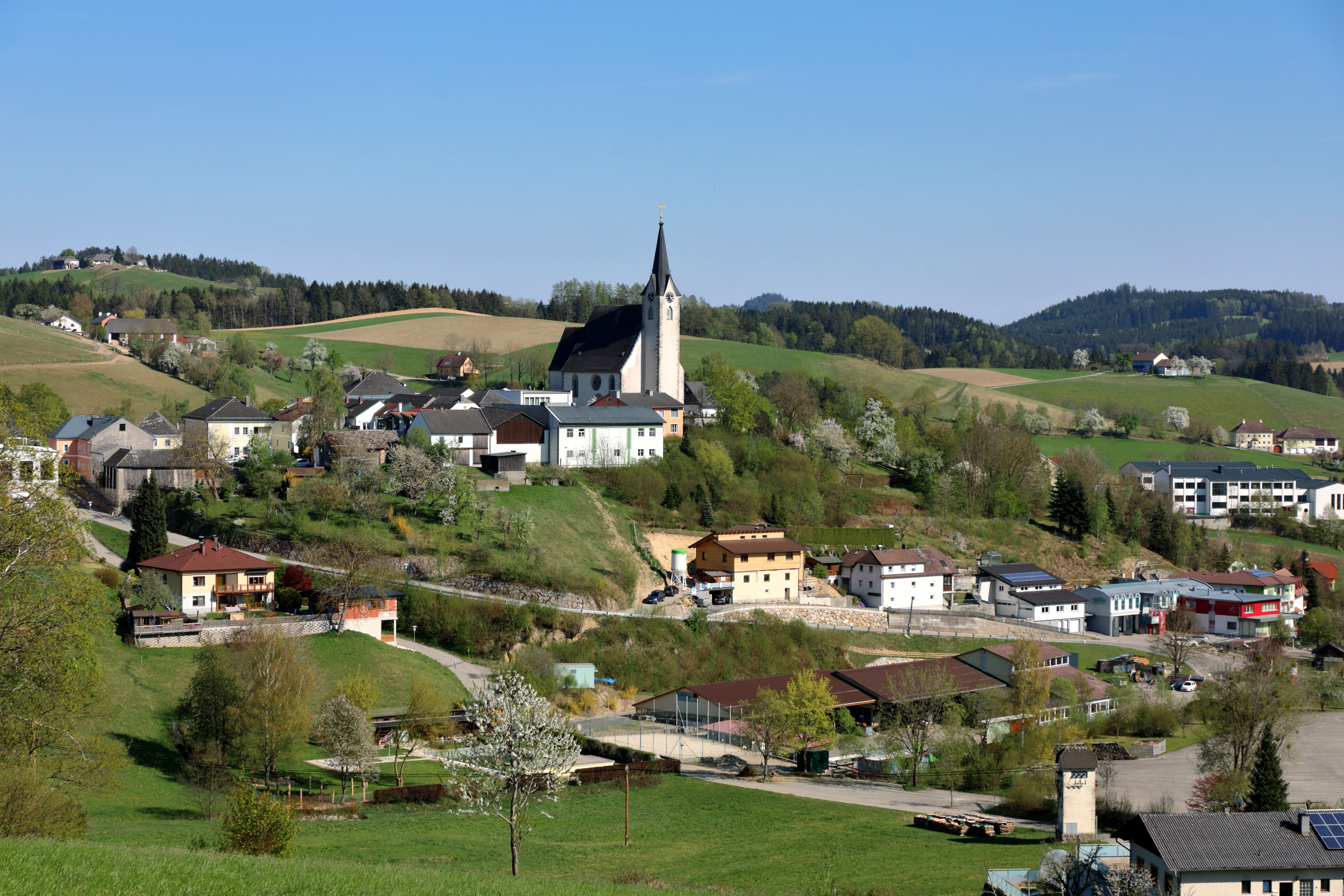

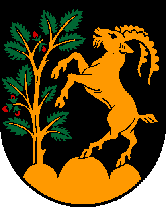
- Coat of arms

- Location within Austria
- Coordinates: 48°19′01″N 14°49′01″E
- Country: Austria
- State: Upper Austria
- District: Perg

Government
  - Mayor: Johann Buchberger (ÖVP)

Area
  - Total: 40.96 km^{2} (15.81 sq mi)
- Elevation: 571 m (1,873 ft)

Population (2018-01-01)
  - Total: 1,706
  - Density: 41.65/km^{2} (107.9/sq mi)
- Time zone: UTC+1 (CET)
  - Summer (DST): UTC+2 (CEST)
- Postal code: 4363
- Area code: 07265
- Vehicle registration: PE
- Website: www.pabneukirchen.at

Pabneukirchen is a municipality in the district of Perg in the Austrian state of Upper Austria.

== Geography ==
Pabneukirchen lies in the Mühlviertel. About 37 percent of the municipality is forest, and 58 percent is farmland.

== Population ==
Historical population
Year	Pop.	±%
2005	1,726	—
2014	1,729	+0.2%
2015	1,718	−0.6%
