= Burg Vichtenstein =

Castle in Austria

Coordinates: 48.5289°N 13.6522°E

- Upper Austria, Austria
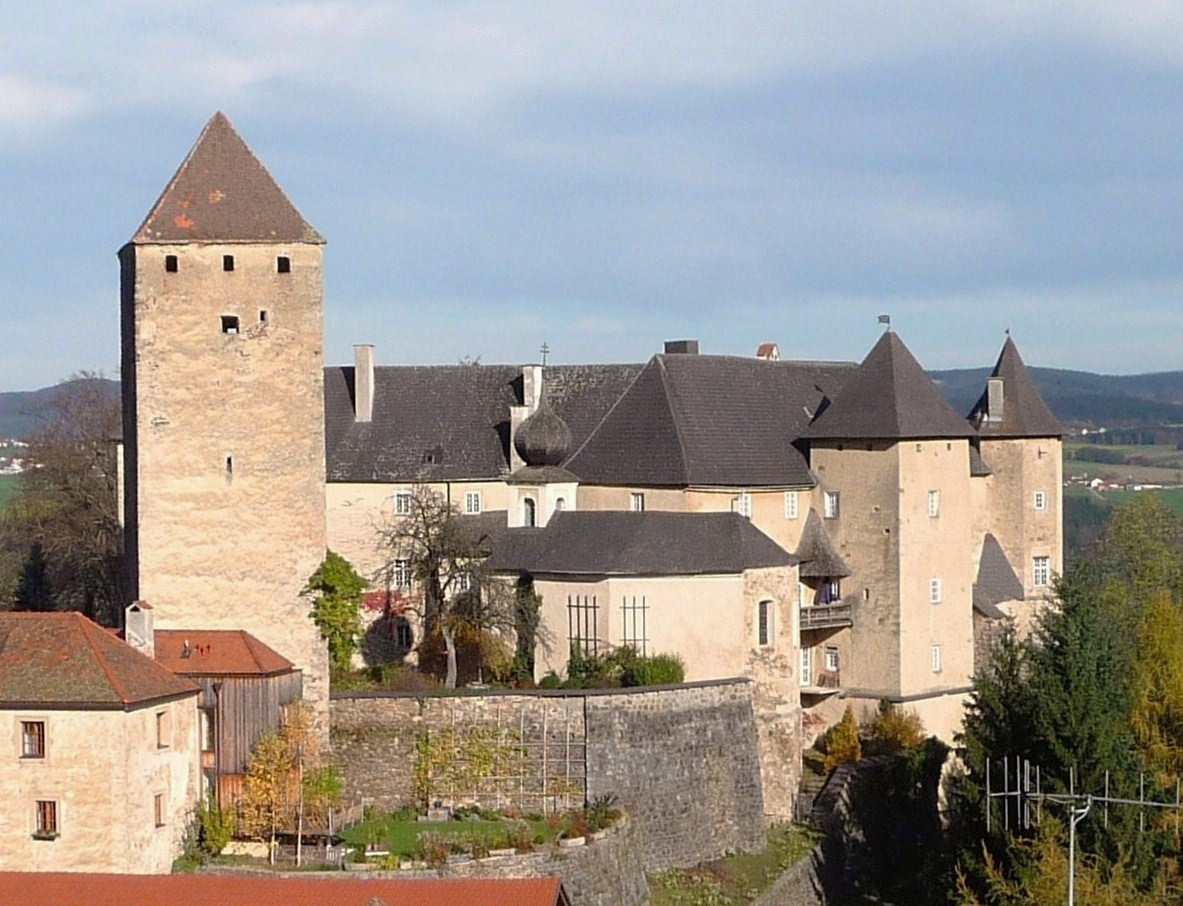

Site information
- Type: Castle

Burg Vichtenstein is a castle in Upper Austria, Austria. Burg Vichtenstein is 531 metres (1,742 ft) above sea level.

The Vichtenstein castle sits in the "sow forest" (upper Austria) above the Danube valley opposite to the market municipality of Upper Cell (Lower Bavaria). The castle is in the centre of the municipality Vichtenstein. There is no documentary for the construction of the castle but it is believed to have been started around the year 1100. The castle was an administrative centre of the Bishopric of Passau and in the 14th century it was mortgaged several times until it became the property of the counts of Schauberg.

== See also ==
- List of castles in Austria
