= Perg District =

Coordinates: 48.272°N 14.683°E

Perg District Bezirk Perg
- District
- Country: Austria
- State: Upper Austria
- Number of municipalities: 26
- Administrative seat: Perg

Government
  - District Governor: Werner Kreisl (since 2011)

Area
  - Total: 613.18 km^{2} (236.75 sq mi)

Population (2024)
  - Total: 70,516
  - Density: 115.00/km^{2} (297.85/sq mi)
- Time zone: UTC+01:00 (CET)
  - Summer (DST): UTC+02:00 (CEST)
- Vehicle registration: PE
- NUTS code: AT313
- District code: 411

Bezirk Perg is a district of the state of Upper Austria in Austria.

== Municipalities ==
Towns (Städte) are indicated in boldface; market towns (Marktgemeinden) in italics; suburbs, hamlets and other subdivisions of a municipality are indicated in small characters.

- Allerheiligen im Mühlkreis
- Arbing
- Bad Kreuzen
- Baumgartenberg
- Dimbach
- **Grein**
- Katsdorf
- Klam
- Langenstein
- Luftenberg an der Donau
- Mauthausen
- Mitterkirchen im Machland
- Münzbach
- Naarn im Machlande
- Pabneukirchen
- **Perg**
- Rechberg
- Ried in der Riedmark
- Sankt Georgen am Walde
- Sankt Georgen an der Gusen
- Sankt Nikola an der Donau
- Sankt Thomas am Blasenstein
- Saxen
- Schwertberg
- Waldhausen im Strudengau
- Windhaag bei Perg
