= Sankt Nikola an der Donau =

- Municipality
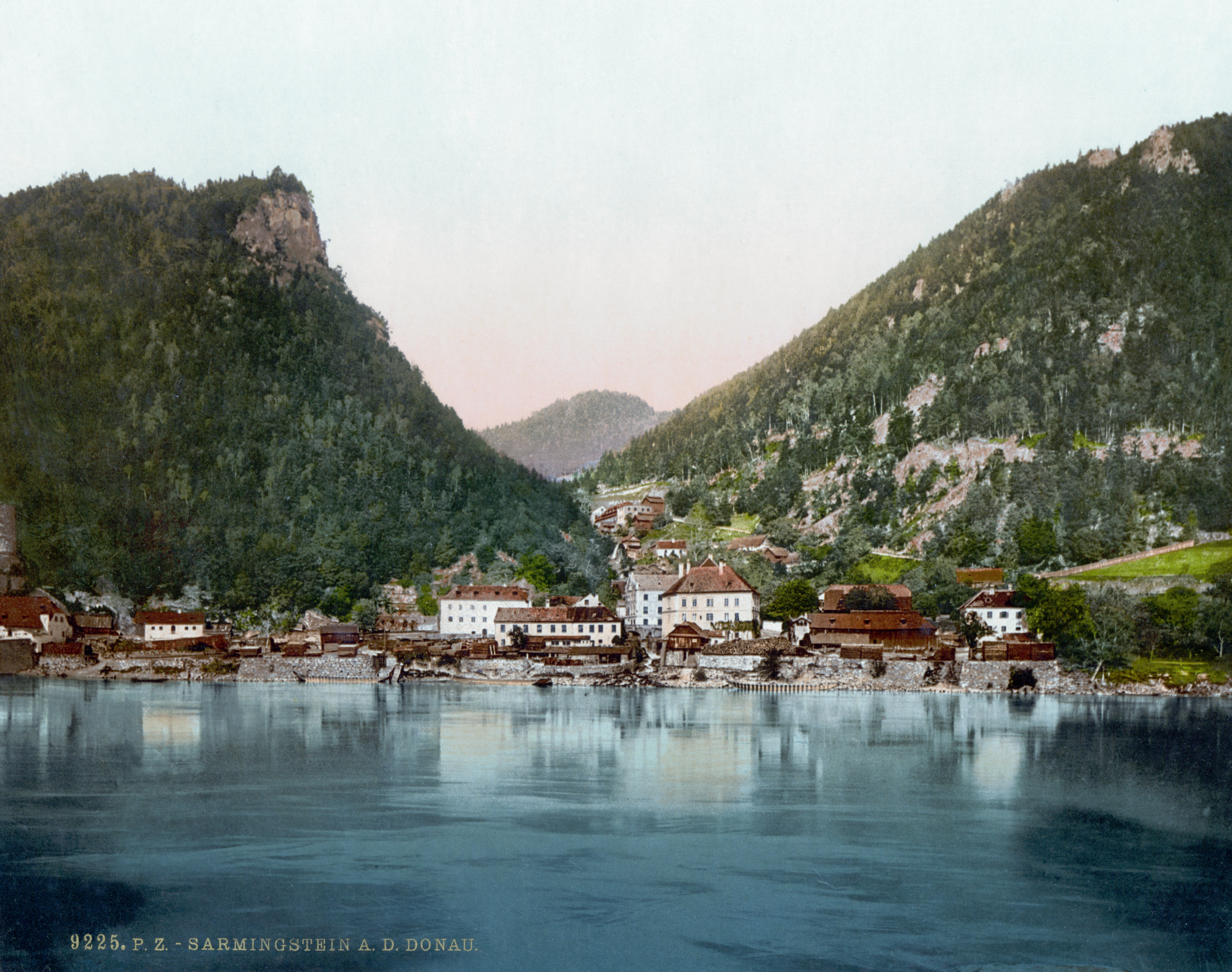

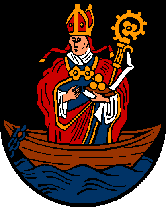
- Coat of arms

- Location within Austria
- Coordinates: 48°14′00″N 14°54′24″E
- Country: Austria
- State: Upper Austria
- District: Perg

Government
  - Mayor: Nikolaus Prinz (ÖVP)

Area
  - Total: 13.18 km^{2} (5.09 sq mi)
- Elevation: 249 m (817 ft)

Population (2018-01-01)
  - Total: 798
  - Density: 60.5/km^{2} (157/sq mi)
- Time zone: UTC+1 (CET)
  - Summer (DST): UTC+2 (CEST)
- Postal code: 4381
- Area code: 07268
- Vehicle registration: PE

Sankt Nikola an der Donau (also St. Nikola an der Donau) is a municipality in the district of Perg in the Austrian state of Upper Austria.

== Geography ==
Sankt Nikola lies in the Mühlviertel. About 53 percent of the municipality is forest, and 33 percent is farmland.

== Population ==
Historical population
Year	Pop.	±%
2005	847	—
2014	830	−2.0%
2015	832	+0.2%
