= Katsdorf =

- Municipality
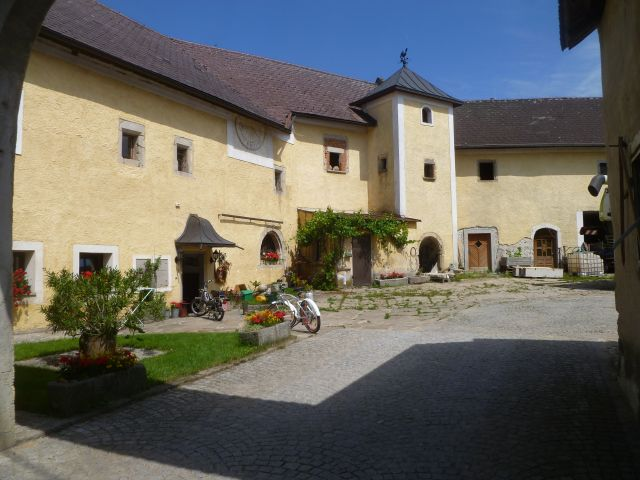
- Breitenbruck castle courtyard

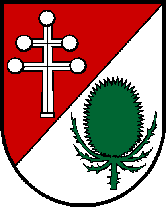
- Coat of arms

- Location within Austria
- Coordinates: 48°19′01″N 14°28′27″E
- Country: Austria
- State: Upper Austria
- District: Perg

Government
  - Mayor: Wolfgang Greil (ÖVP)

Area
  - Total: 14.66 km^{2} (5.66 sq mi)
- Elevation: 306 m (1,004 ft)

Population (2018-01-01)
  - Total: 3,086
  - Density: 210.5/km^{2} (545.2/sq mi)
- Time zone: UTC+1 (CET)
  - Summer (DST): UTC+2 (CEST)
- Postal code: 4223
- Area code: 07235
- Vehicle registration: PE
- Website: www.katsdorf.at

Katsdorf is a municipality in the district Perg in the Austrian state of Upper Austria.

== Geography ==
Katsdorf lies in the Mühlviertel. About 11 percent of the municipality is forest, and 76 percent is farmland.

== History ==
=== World War II ===
On May 5, 1945, Major General Holmes Ely Dager's 11th Armored Division captured Katsdorf. On August 1, 1945, Soviet troops took over.
