= Dimbach, Austria =

Dimbach
- Municipality
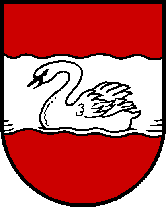
- Coat of arms

- Location within Austria
- Coordinates: 48°18′30″N 14°54′37″E
- Country: Austria
- State: Upper Austria
- District: Perg

Government
  - Mayor: Josef Wiesinger (ÖVP)

Area
  - Total: 31.39 km^{2} (12.12 sq mi)
- Elevation: 680 m (2,230 ft)

Population (2018-01-01)
  - Total: 1,013
  - Density: 32.27/km^{2} (83.58/sq mi)
- Time zone: UTC+1 (CET)
  - Summer (DST): UTC+2 (CEST)
- Postal code: 4371
- Area code: 07260
- Vehicle registration: PE
- Website: www.dimbach.at

Dimbach (German pronunciation: [ˈdɪmbax]) is a municipality in the district Perg in Upper Austria, Austria. It had a population of 1015 according to the 2015 census.

== History ==
The precise date that Dimbach was founded, is entirely unknown, because there are no documents about it, although it originally lay in the eastern part of the duchy of Bavaria. Dimbach has some late-Gothic church buildings and an old monastery, the Säbnich Monastery discovered in Waldhausen documents dated to the year 1147 in a parish which was a known place of pilgrimage.

Between 1420 and 1436 murdering and robbing of the Hussites took place in the parish. Since 1490 it has been part of the Principality of Austria. Under Emperor Maximilian I, Dimbach was awarded market rights in 1511.

During the Napoleonic Wars the place was occupied several times. Since 1918 the town has belonged to the province of Upper Austria. After the Anschluss with the German Empire on 13 March 1938 the place belonged to the "Upper Danube Gau" but after 1945 was restored to Upper Austria.

== Geography ==
Dimbach has an area of 31 km ². The town lies in northern Austria, in the east of Upper Austria. Dimbach lies east of the city of Linz and is located at an altitude of 680 metres. The extension is 6.5 kilometers from north to south, from west to east 8.4 kilometers. The total area is 31.3 km^{2}. 43.8% of the area is forested, 52.4% of the area is used for agriculture. Quarters include Dimbach, Dimbachreith, Großerlau, Hornberg, Kleinerlau, Vorderdimbach and Gassen.

== Population ==
The population has declined slightly. In 1991 the town had 1118 inhabitants, in 2001 it had 1103 inhabitants. The 2005 census recorded a population of 1,083 and in 2015 of 1,015 inhabitants.

== Economy ==
The municipality has a number of carpentry and food retailing industries. The main church is the Wallsfahrtskirche, a tall white building with a pointy grey roof.
