= Grein, Austria =

Grein
- Municipality
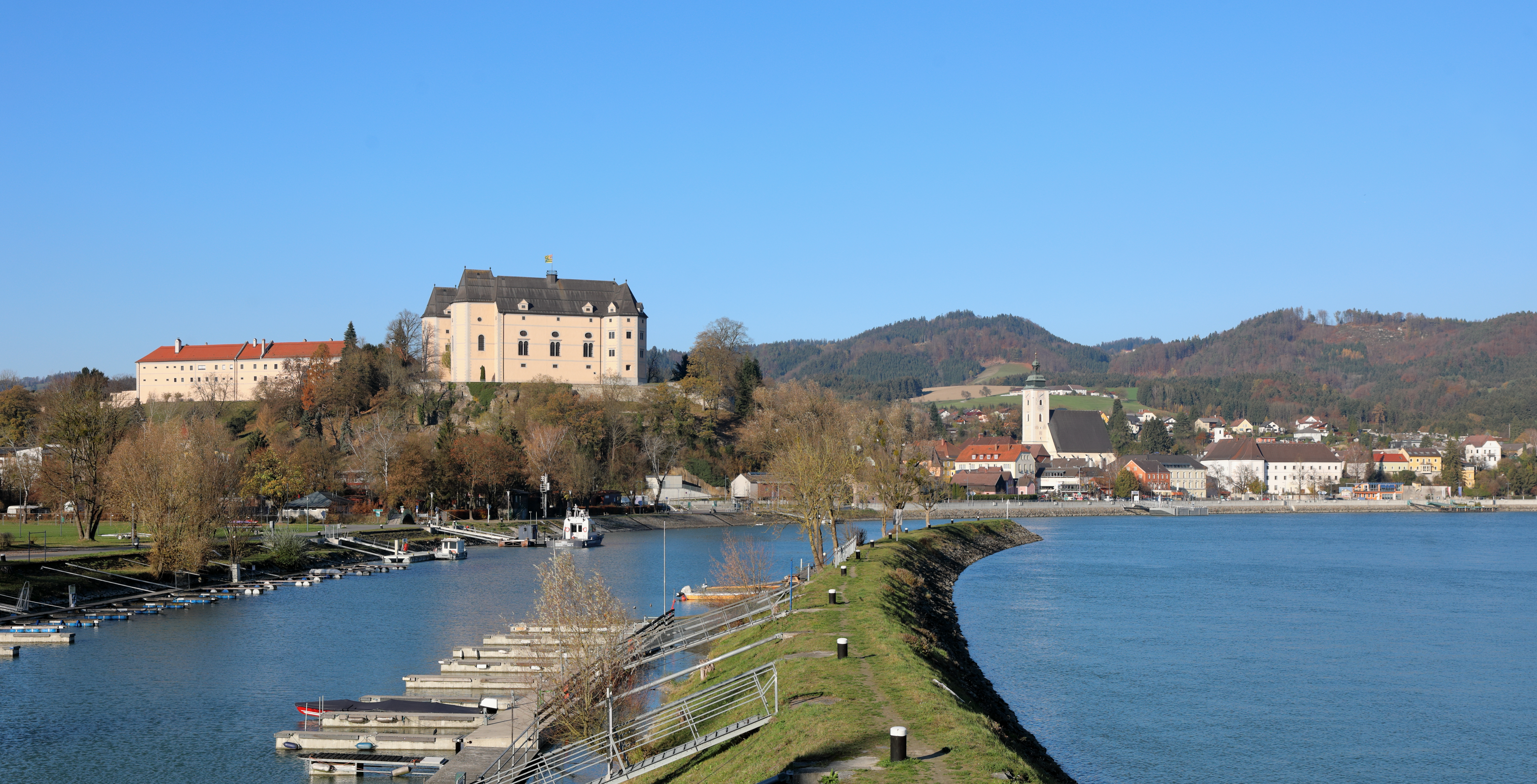

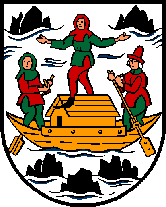
- Coat of arms

- Location within Austria
- Coordinates: 48°13′41″N 14°51′02″E
- Country: Austria
- State: Upper Austria
- District: Perg

Government
  - Mayor: Mag. Rainer Barth ([ÖVP])

Area
  - Total: 18.41 km^{2} (7.11 sq mi)
- Elevation: 239 m (784 ft)

Population (2018-01-01)
  - Total: 2,926
  - Density: 158.9/km^{2} (411.6/sq mi)
- Time zone: UTC+1 (CET)
  - Summer (DST): UTC+2 (CEST)
- Postal code: 4360
- Area code: 07268
- Vehicle registration: PE
- Website: www.grein.ooe.gv.at

Grein is a municipality in the district Perg in the Austrian state of Upper Austria. It lies on the Danube River.

== Population ==
Historical population
Year	Pop.	±%
1869	1,919	—
1880	1,890	−1.5%
1890	1,847	−2.3%
1900	1,953	+5.7%
1910	1,984	+1.6%
1923	1,839	−7.3%
1934	2,054	+11.7%
1939	2,005	−2.4%
1951	2,519	+25.6%
1961	2,518	−0.0%
1971	2,767	+9.9%
1981	2,817	+1.8%
1991	2,910	+3.3%
2001	3,109	+6.8%
2011	3,022	−2.8%
2015	2,973	−1.6%

== Sights ==
One attraction in Grein is Greinburg Castle, built between 1488 and 1493. The castle was purchased by Ernest I, Duke of Saxe-Coburg and Gotha in 1823 and is now owned by a family foundation, headed by Andreas, Prince of Saxe-Coburg and Gotha. The ducal family is living here but the castle is also open for visitors.

Further there is the oldest theatre in all of Austria located in the city.

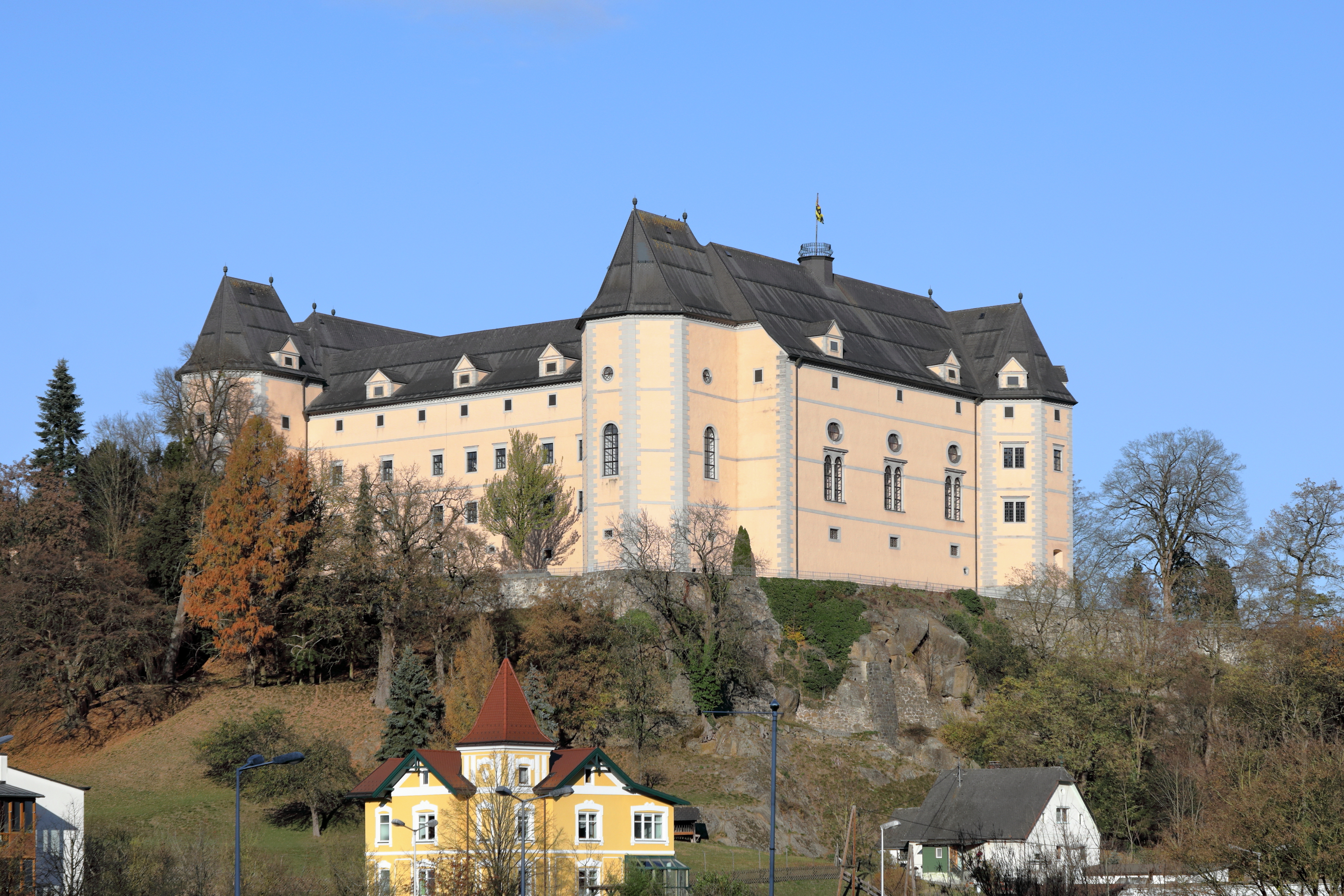
Greinburg Castle
