= Perg =

Municipality in Upper Austria

- Municipality
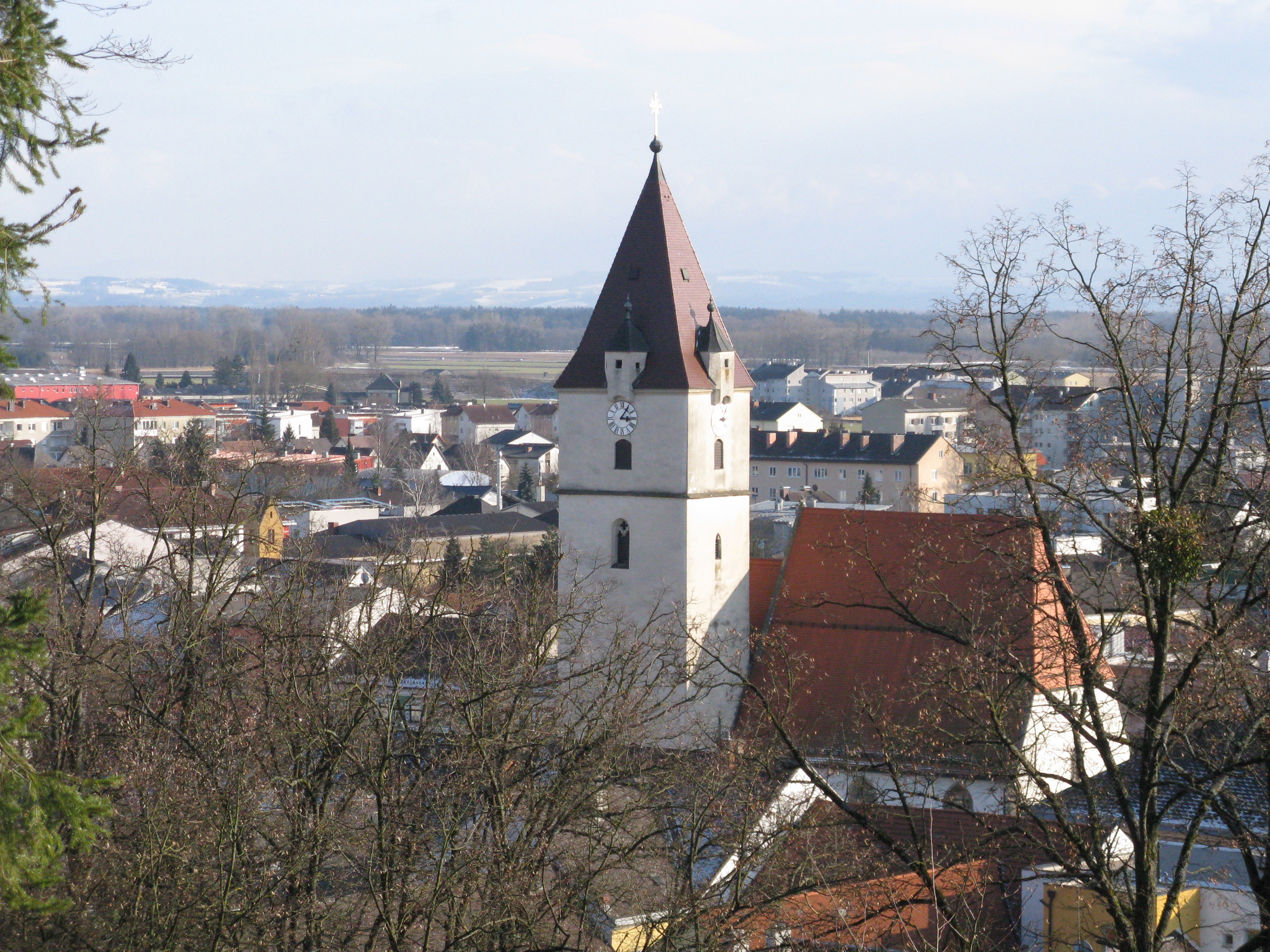
- Parish Church of Saint James the Elder

- Coat of arms

- Location within Austria
- Coordinates: 48°15′1″N 14°38′1″E
- Country: Austria
- State: Upper Austria
- District: Perg

Government
  - Mayor: Anton Froschauer (ÖVP)

Area
  - Total: 26.44 km^{2} (10.21 sq mi)
- Elevation: 250 m (820 ft)

Population (2018-01-01)
  - Total: 8,388
  - Density: 317.2/km^{2} (821.7/sq mi)
- Time zone: UTC+1 (CET)
  - Summer (DST): UTC+2 (CEST)
- Postal code: 4320
- Area code: 07262
- Vehicle registration: PE
- Website: www.perg.at

Perg is a city in the Austrian state of Upper Austria, capital of the district of the same name.

== History ==
Originally in the eastern part of the Duchy of Bavaria, Perg belonged to Austria from the 12th century on. In 1269 it received commercial privileges from King Ottokar II of Bohemia (also duke of Austria), and from 1490 it was part of the Principality of Austria on the Ems. Autonomous from 1542, it was occupied several times during the Napoleonic Wars.

== Population ==
Historical population
Year	Pop.	±%
1869	2,822	—
1880	2,902	+2.8%
1890	2,978	+2.6%
1900	3,078	+3.4%
1910	3,231	+5.0%
1923	3,223	−0.2%
1934	3,264	+1.3%
1939	3,512	+7.6%
1951	3,773	+7.4%
1961	4,106	+8.8%
1971	4,913	+19.7%
1981	5,207	+6.0%
1991	5,958	+14.4%
2001	7,129	+19.7%
2011	7,727	+8.4%
2015	8,136	+5.3%

== Main sights ==
- Einhorn, a large unicorn sculpture inspired to the city's coat of arms.
- Seifensiederhaus (workshop and home of a soap boiler), built in 1563.
- The Late Baroque Kalvarienbergkirche (Church of the Calvary Hill, 1734–1735)
- Pranger (pillory), a column in the main square of the city, built in 1587.
- Steinbrecherhaus (home of mill-stone workers), a little house in old quarries of Perg with original furnishing, built in 1802
