= Langenstein, Austria =

Langenstein
- Municipality
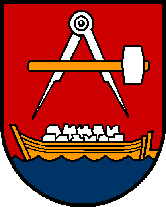
- Coat of arms

- Location within Austria
- Coordinates: 48°15′31″N 14°27′51″E
- Country: Austria
- State: Upper Austria
- District: Perg

Government
  - Mayor: Christian Aufreiter (SPÖ)

Area
  - Total: 12.36 km^{2} (4.77 sq mi)
- Elevation: 245 m (804 ft)

Population (2018-01-01)
  - Total: 2,534
  - Density: 205.0/km^{2} (531.0/sq mi)
- Time zone: UTC+1 (CET)
  - Summer (DST): UTC+2 (CEST)
- Postal code: 4222, 4310, 4312
- Area code: 07237
- Vehicle registration: PE
- Website: www.langenstein.at

Langenstein is a municipality in the district of Perg in the Austrian state of Upper Austria.

== Geography ==
Langenstein lies in the Mühlviertel. About 27 percent of the municipality is forest, and 51 percent is farmland.
