= 1927–28 Rochdale A.F.C. season =

English football club season

Rochdale
1927–28 season
- Manager: Jack Peart
- Stadium: Spotland Stadium
- Football League Third Division North: 13th
- FA Cup: 2nd Round
- Top goalscorer: League: Albert Whitehurst (32); All: Albert Whitehurst (36)

The 1927–28 season was Rochdale A.F.C.'s 21st in existence and their 7th in the Football League Third Division North.

== Squad Statistics ==
=== Appearances and goals ===
| No. | Pos | Nat | Player | Total | | League Division 3 North | | FA Cup | |
| No. | Pos | Nat | Player | Apps | Goals | Apps | Goals | Apps | Goals |
|---|---|---|---|---|---|---|---|---|---|
| | GK | (England) ENG | Harry Moody | 21 | 0 | 19 | 0 | 2 | 0 |
| | DF | (Scotland) SCO | Willie Brown | 17 | 0 | 16 | 0 | 1 | 0 |
| | DF | (England) ENG | Yaffer Ward | 33 | 0 | 32 | 0 | 1 | 0 |
| | DF | (England) ENG | Ernie Braidwood | 29 | 0 | 27 | 0 | 2 | 0 |
| | DF | (England) ENG | David Parkes | 31 | 2 | 29 | 2 | 2 | 0 |
| | DF | (Scotland) SCO | Alex Christie | 33 | 0 | 33 | 0 | 0 | 0 |
| | FW | (England) ENG | Billy Tompkinson | 40 | 11 | 38 | 11 | 2 | 0 |
| | FW | (England) ENG | Billy Bertram | 41 | 14 | 40 | 13 | 1 | 1 |
| | FW | (England) ENG | Albert Whitehurst | 43 | 36 | 41 | 32 | 2 | 4 |
| | FW | (England) ENG | Jack Barber | 31 | 1 | 29 | 1 | 2 | 0 |
| | FW | (England) ENG | Bobby Hughes | 26 | 5 | 26 | 5 | 0 | 0 |
| | MF | (England) ENG | Henry Martin | 18 | 2 | 16 | 1 | 2 | 1 |
| | MF | (England) ENG | Jack Hall | 21 | 1 | 20 | 1 | 1 | 0 |
| | FW | (England) ENG | Joe Clennell | 15 | 5 | 13 | 2 | 2 | 3 |
| | DF | (Wales) WAL | Dai Hopkins | 8 | 0 | 8 | 0 | 0 | 0 |
| | MF | (England) ENG | Cecil Halkyard | 7 | 0 | 7 | 0 | 0 | 0 |
| | DF | (England) ENG | John Stephenson | 22 | 0 | 22 | 0 | 0 | 0 |
| | GK | (England) ENG | Eddie Plane | 2 | 0 | 2 | 0 | 0 | 0 |
| | GK | (England) ENG | William Wood | 1 | 0 | 1 | 0 | 0 | 0 |
| | FW | (England) ENG | Bob Schofield | 3 | 0 | 3 | 0 | 0 | 0 |
| | GK | (Wales) WAL | Jackie Mittell | 19 | 0 | 19 | 0 | 0 | 0 |
| | DF | (England) ENG | Allan Murray | 5 | 1 | 5 | 1 | 0 | 0 |
| | MF | (England) ENG | Uriah Miles | 7 | 2 | 7 | 2 | 0 | 0 |
| | DF | (England) ENG | Walter Webster | 7 | 1 | 7 | 1 | 0 | 0 |
| | MF | (England) ENG | Eric Holroyd | 1 | 0 | 1 | 0 | 0 | 0 |
| | GK | (England) ENG | Albert Monks | 1 | 0 | 1 | 0 | 0 | 0 |
| | GK | | W. Heywood | 0 | 0 | 0 | 0 | 0 | 0 |
| | MF | (England) ENG | Alfred Kellett | 0 | 0 | 0 | 0 | 0 | 0 |

Squad Statistics (Non-competitive)

=== Appearances and goals (non-competitive) ===
| No. | Pos | Nat | Player | Total | | Lancashire Cup | | Manchester Cup | |
| No. | Pos | Nat | Player | Apps | Goals | Apps | Goals | Apps | Goals |
|---|---|---|---|---|---|---|---|---|---|
| | GK | (England) ENG | Harry Moody | 1 | 0 | 1 | 0 | 0 | 0 |
| | DF | (Scotland) SCO | Willie Brown | 1 | 0 | 1 | 0 | 0 | 0 |
| | DF | (England) ENG | Yaffer Ward | 1 | 0 | 0 | 0 | 1 | 0 |
| | DF | (England) ENG | Ernie Braidwood | 2 | 0 | 1 | 0 | 1 | 0 |
| | DF | (England) ENG | David Parkes | 0 | 0 | 0 | 0 | 0 | 0 |
| | DF | (Scotland) SCO | Alex Christie | 1 | 0 | 1 | 0 | 0 | 0 |
| | FW | (England) ENG | Billy Tompkinson | 1 | 0 | 1 | 0 | 0 | 0 |
| | FW | (England) ENG | Billy Bertram | 1 | 0 | 1 | 0 | 0 | 0 |
| | FW | (England) ENG | Albert Whitehurst | 1 | 2 | 1 | 2 | 0 | 0 |
| | FW | (England) ENG | Jack Barber | 1 | 0 | 1 | 0 | 0 | 0 |
| | FW | (England) ENG | Bobby Hughes | 0 | 0 | 0 | 0 | 0 | 0 |
| | MF | (England) ENG | Henry Martin | 1 | 0 | 0 | 0 | 1 | 0 |
| | MF | (England) ENG | Jack Hall | 0 | 0 | 0 | 0 | 0 | 0 |
| | FW | (England) ENG | Joe Clennell | 1 | 0 | 0 | 0 | 1 | 0 |
| | DF | (Wales) WAL | Dai Hopkins | 2 | 0 | 1 | 0 | 1 | 0 |
| | MF | (England) ENG | Cecil Halkyard | 1 | 0 | 0 | 0 | 1 | 0 |
| | DF | (England) ENG | John Stephenson | 0 | 0 | 0 | 0 | 0 | 0 |
| | GK | (England) ENG | Eddie Plane | 0 | 0 | 0 | 0 | 0 | 0 |
| | GK | (England) ENG | William Wood | 0 | 0 | 0 | 0 | 0 | 0 |
| | FW | (England) ENG | Bob Schofield | 1 | 0 | 0 | 0 | 1 | 0 |
| | GK | (Wales) WAL | Jackie Mittell | 0 | 0 | 0 | 0 | 0 | 0 |
| | DF | (England) ENG | Allan Murray | 0 | 0 | 0 | 0 | 0 | 0 |
| | MF | (England) ENG | Uriah Miles | 1 | 0 | 0 | 0 | 1 | 0 |
| | DF | (England) ENG | Walter Webster | 1 | 0 | 0 | 0 | 1 | 0 |
| | MF | (England) ENG | Eric Holroyd | 0 | 0 | 0 | 0 | 0 | 0 |
| | GK | (England) ENG | Albert Monks | 0 | 0 | 0 | 0 | 0 | 0 |
| | GK | | W. Heywood | 1 | 0 | 0 | 0 | 1 | 0 |
| | MF | (England) ENG | Alfred Kellett | 1 | 0 | 0 | 0 | 1 | 0 |

== Final league table ==
| Pos | Team | Pld | W | D | L | GF | GA | GAv | Pts |
|---|---|---|---|---|---|---|---|---|---|
| 11 | Wrexham | 42 | 18 | 6 | 18 | 64 | 67 | 0.955 | 42 |
| 12 | Halifax Town | 42 | 13 | 15 | 14 | 73 | 71 | 1.028 | 41 |
| 13 | Rochdale | 42 | 17 | 7 | 18 | 74 | 77 | 0.961 | 41 |
| 14 | Rotherham United | 42 | 14 | 11 | 17 | 65 | 69 | 0.942 | 39 |
| 15 | Hartlepools United | 42 | 16 | 6 | 20 | 69 | 81 | 0.852 | 38 |

Source: rsssf.com

== Competitions ==
=== Football League Third Division North ===
| 27 August 1927 1 | Barrow | 1–3 | Rochdale | Barrow-in-Furness |
| | Brown | Report | Bertram; Barber; Whitehurst | Stadium: Holker Street; Attendance: 7783 |

| 30 August 1927 2 | Rochdale | 2–1 | Stockport County | Rochdale |
| | Bertram; Hughes | Report | Burgess | Stadium: Spotland Stadium; Attendance: 10253 |

| 3 September 1927 3 | Rochdale | 1–0 | Nelson | Rochdale |
| | Whitehurst | Report | | Stadium: Spotland Stadium; Attendance: 9869 |

| 10 September 1927 4 | Wigan Borough | 1–2 | Rochdale | Wigan |
| | Fenner | Report | Bertram; Whitehurst | Stadium: Springfield Park; Attendance: 5275 |

| 17 September 1927 5 | Rotherham United | 3–1 | Rochdale | Rotherham |
| | Parkin; Scott | Report | Whitehurst | Stadium: Millmoor; Attendance: 4911 |

| 24 September 1927 6 | Rochdale | 5–1 | Southport | Rochdale |
| | Whitehurst; Parkes; Bertram; Tompkinson | Report | Hamilton | Stadium: Spotland Stadium; Attendance: 6264 |

| 1 October 1927 7 | Durham City | 3–2 | Rochdale | Durham |
| | Robson (pen.); Leedham | Report | Tompkinson; Gurkin (o.g.) | Stadium: Holiday Park; Attendance: 2354 |

| 8 October 1927 8 | Rochdale | 3–0 | Wrexham | Rochdale |
| | Tompkinson; Whitehurst | Report | | Stadium: Spotland Stadium; Attendance: 7493 |

| 15 October 1927 9 | Chesterfield | 1–3 | Rochdale | Chesterfield |
| | Oxley | Report | Hughes; Whitehurst | Stadium: Saltergate; Attendance: 5439 |

| 22 October 1927 10 | Rochdale | 0–3 | Lincoln City | Rochdale |
| | | Report | Pegg; Dinsdale; Basnett | Stadium: Spotland Stadium; Attendance: 5229 |

| 29 October 1927 11 | Hartlepools United | 0–2 | Rochdale | Hartlepool |
| | | Report | Parkes; Hughes | Stadium: Victoria Park; Attendance: 4086 |

| 5 November 1927 Abandoned | Rochdale | 1 a 1 | Accrington Stanley | Rochdale |
| | Tompkinson | | Goal | Stadium: Spotland Stadium; Attendance: 3000 |

| 12 November 1927 12 | New Brighton | 2–1 | Rochdale | New Brighton |
| | Harley | Report | Bertram | Stadium: Sandheys Park; Attendance: 4409 |

| 19 November 1927 13 | Rochdale | 3–3 | Bradford City | Rochdale |
| | Russell (o.g.); Tompkinson; Whitehurst | Report | Harvey; Richardson; Summers | Stadium: Spotland Stadium; Attendance: 5952 |

| 3 December 1927 14 | Rochdale | 4–0 | Crewe Alexandra | Rochdale |
| | Whitehurst; Tompkinson; Martin | Report | | Stadium: Spotland Stadium; Attendance: 3991 |

| 17 December 1927 15 | Rochdale | 4–1 | Darlington | Rochdale |
| | Whitehurst; Tompkinson; Hughes | Report | Cochrane | Stadium: Spotland Stadium; Attendance: 3912 |

| 24 December 1927 16 | Doncaster Rovers | 5–2 | Rochdale | Doncaster |
| | T. Keetley (pen.); Philipson; Hall | Report | Whitehurst; Bertram | Stadium: Belle Vue; Attendance: 5291 |

| 27 December 1927 17 | Bradford Park Avenue | 4–1 | Rochdale | Bradford |
| | Hart; Quantrill; Taylor | Report | Bertram | Stadium: Park Avenue; Attendance: 21762 |

| 31 December 1927 18 | Rochdale | 3–0 | Barrow | Rochdale |
| | Tompkinson; Clennell | Report | | Stadium: Spotland Stadium; Attendance: 3973 |

| 2 January 1928 19 | Stockport County | 5–1 | Rochdale | Stockport |
| | Newton; Smith; Scullion | Report | Tompkinson | Stadium: Edgeley Park; Attendance: 10571 |

| 3 January 1928 20 | Rochdale | 0–4 | Bradford Park Avenue | Rochdale |
| | | Report | Hart; Quantrill | Stadium: Spotland Stadium; Attendance: 5481 |

| 7 January 1928 21 | Nelson | 6–3 | Rochdale | Nelson |
| | McClure; McGuire; Radford; Harry Taylor | Report | Whitehurst; Clennell | Stadium: Seedhill; Attendance: 2539 |

| 14 January 1928 22 | Ashington | 5–1 | Rochdale | Ashington |
| | Graham; Johnson; Wood (o.g.); Chipperfiled | Report | Whitehurst | Stadium: Portland Park; Attendance: 1223 |

| 21 January 1928 23 | Rochdale | 3–0 | Wigan Borough | Rochdale |
| | Bertram; Whitehurst | Report | | Stadium: Spotland Stadium; Attendance: 3626 |

| 4 February 1928 24 | Southport | 3–1 | Rochdale | Southport |
| | Marshall; Devine | Report | Tompkinson | Stadium: Haig Avenue; Attendance: 2731 |

| 11 February 1928 25 | Rochdale | 1–0 | Durham City | Rochdale |
| | Bertram | Report | | Stadium: Spotland Stadium; Attendance: 1458 |

| 18 February 1928 26 | Wrexham | 2–1 | Rochdale | Wrexham |
| | Harris; Bob T Jones | Report | Whitehurst | Stadium: Racecourse Ground; Attendance: 4157 |

| 25 February 1928 27 | Rochdale | 5–1 | Chesterfield | Rochdale |
| | Whitehurst; Bertram | Report | Williams | Stadium: Spotland Stadium; Attendance: 2602 |

| 28 February 1928 28 | Rochdale | 2–1 | Rotherham United | Rochdale |
| | Whitehurst; Hall | Report | Scott | Stadium: Spotland Stadium; Attendance: 1885 |

| 3 March 1928 29 | Lincoln City | 3–1 | Rochdale | Lincoln |
| | Dinsdale; Pringle | Report | Whitehurst | Stadium: Sincil Bank; Attendance: 5760 |

| 10 March 1928 30 | Rochdale | 0–1 | Hartlepools United | Rochdale |
| | | Report | Robinson | Stadium: Spotland Stadium; Attendance: 2582 |

| 17 March 1928 31 | Accrington Stanley | 1–0 | Rochdale | Accrington |
| | Barclay (pen.) | Report | | Stadium: Peel Park; Attendance: 3885 |

| 24 March 1928 32 | Rochdale | 0–0 | New Brighton | Rochdale |
| | | Report | | Stadium: Spotland Stadium; Attendance: 2404 |

| 31 March 1928 33 | Bradford City | 2–2 | Rochdale | Bradford |
| | Scriven; Cairns | Report | Miles; Hughes | Stadium: Valley Parade; Attendance: 10565 |

| 6 April 1928 34 | Tranmere Rovers | 3–0 | Rochdale | Birkenhead |
| | Flanagan; Bevan; Urmson | Report | | Stadium: Prenton Park; Attendance: 10053 |

| 7 April 1928 35 | Rochdale | 2–2 | Ashington | Rochdale |
| | Bertram; Whitehurst | Report | Robert Robinson; Johnson | Stadium: Spotland Stadium; Attendance: 3309 |

| 9 April 1928 36 | Rochdale | 1–2 | Tranmere Rovers | Rochdale |
| | Whitehurst | Report | Charlton; Flanagan | Stadium: Spotland Stadium; Attendance: 3069 |

| 10 April 1928 37 | Halifax Town | 1–1 | Rochdale | Halifax |
| | Waites | Report | Whitehurst | Stadium: The Shay; Attendance: 3595 |

| 14 April 1928 38 | Crewe Alexandra | 1–1 | Rochdale | Crewe |
| | Owen | Report | Miles | Stadium: Gresty Road; Attendance: 2887 |

| 21 April 1928 39 | Rochdale | 2–2 | Halifax Town | Rochdale |
| | Murray; Whitehurst | Report | Coleman; Dixon | Stadium: Spotland Stadium; Attendance: 2099 |

| 28 April 1928 40 | Darlington | 1–0 | Rochdale | Darlington |
| | Gregg | Report | | Stadium: Feethams; Attendance: 2708 |

| 1 May 1928 41 | Rochdale | 3–2 | Accrington Stanley | Rochdale |
| | Whitehurst; Bertram | Report | Barber (o.g.); Barclay (pen.) | Stadium: Spotland Stadium; Attendance: 1443 |

| 5 May 1928 42 | Rochdale | 1–0 | Doncaster Rovers | Rochdale |
| | Webster | Report | | Stadium: Spotland Stadium; Attendance: 1768 |

=== FA Cup ===
| 26 November 1927 1 | Rochdale | 8–2 | Crook Town | Rochdale |
| | Whitehurst; Clennell; Martin | Report | Duffy; Mitchell | Stadium: Spotland Stadium; Attendance: 4139 |

| 10 December 1927 2 | Darlington | 2–1 | Rochdale | Darlington |
| | Ruddy | Report | Bertram | Stadium: Feethams; Attendance: 7571 |

=== Lancashire Cup ===
| 7 October 1927 2 | Manchester United | 4–2 | Rochdale | Manchester |
| | Goal | | Whitehurst | Stadium: Old Trafford |

=== Manchester Cup ===
| 10 January 1928 2 | Mossley | 4–0 | Rochdale | Mossley |
| | Goal | | | Stadium: Seel Park |
