= Gerken =

Gerken is a surname. Notable people with the surname include:

- Barbara Gerken (born 1964), American tennis player
- Dean Gerken (born 1985), English footballer
- George Gerken (1903–1977), American baseball player
- Heather K. Gerken (born 1969), American legal scholar
- Jason Gerken (fl. from 1992), American musician
- LouAnn Gerken (born 1959), American academic
- Lüder Gerken (born 1958), German economist
- Martin Gerken, World War 2 German communist
- Paul Gerken (born 1950), American tennis player
- Robert Gerken (1932–2022), British Royal Navy officer
- Rudolph Gerken (1886-1943), American Catholic archbishop

== See also ==
- Gerkens, a surname
- Gerkin (disambiguation)
- Gherkin (disambiguation)
- Gurkin, a surname
- SS Howard S. Gerken, a dredge vessel 1925–1926
