= Gerkin =

Gerkin may refer to:

- Steve Gerkin (1912–1978), American baseball player
- David Gerkin, member of The Red Hot Valentines
- SS Howard S. Gerkin, a steamship

== See also ==
- "Gerkin for Perkin", a song by Clifford Brown from the 1955 album Study in Brown
- Gerken, a surname
- Gerkens, a surname
- Gherkin (disambiguation)
  - Gherkin, a pickled cucumber
- Gurkin, a surname
