= Gurkin =

Gurkin (Russian: Гуркин), feminine: Gurkina is a Russian surname. Notable people with the surname include:

- Grigory Gurkin (1870–1937), Russian landscape painter
- John Gurkin (1895–1976), English footballer
- John A. Gurkin (1888–1976), American electrical contractor and politician
- Pavel Gurkin (born 1966), Russian sport shooter

== See also ==
- Gerken, a surname
- Gerkens, a surname
- Gerkin (disambiguation)
- Gherkin (disambiguation)
  - Gherkin, a pickled cucumber
