= Owen Money =

Welsh actor, comedian, and radio presenter (born 1947)

Owen Money MBE
- Born: Lynn Mittell; 16 May 1947 (age 79); Merthyr Tydfil, Wales, United Kingdom
- Other name: Gerry Braden
- Education: Quakers Yard Grammar School
- Occupations: Actor; comedian; radio presenter; singer
- Years active: 1962–present
- Children: 2
- Father: James Lyons Mittell
- Website: www.owen-money.com

Lynn Mittell MBE (born 16 May 1947), better known by the stage name Owen Money (a pun on "owing money"), is a British musician, actor, comedian, and radio presenter from Merthyr Tydfil, Wales.

== Early life ==
Mittell was born in Merthyr Tydfil at the Royal Oak pub, where his mother, Tydfil, and father, James Lyons, were publicans. The family would later run the Bee Hive pub in Merthyr. Mittell would later follow his parents into the publican business, owning the Silver Slipper pub on Pant Road in Merthyr. Mittell later owned The LA (formerly the Hafod Inn) in Swansea, in response to why the name was changed, Mittell quipped that LA stood for "Lower 'Afod". By 1989, Mittell owned The Whittington Arms in Tonna, which he continued to run alongside his entertainment career.

== Music career ==
Mittell was bassist of Merthyr Tydfil-based band The Crescendos, who amalgamated with another Merthyr band, The Rebels, to form The Bystanders in 1962. Mittell changed his name to Gerry Braden, and became lead singer in a line-up with Micky Jones (guitar and vocals), Clive John (guitar, keyboards and vocals), Ray Williams (bass), and Jeff Jones (drums). The Bystanders signed to Pylot Records in 1963, with the initial release "That's the End" (with "This Time" as the B-side) in 1965. After moving to Piccadilly Records, the band achieved their greatest success in February 1967, when the double-sided cover single "98.6" (with a Marvin Gaye's "Stubborn Kind of Fellow" as the B-side) peaked at number 45 in the UK Singles Chart. Gerry Braden left The Bystanders in 1967, to be replaced by Vic Oakley from The Meteorites, who was, in turn, replaced by Deke Leonard, when The Bystanders became Man. Owen Money reformed the Bystanders in 1998 for a one-off performance at Maesteg Town Hall.

Mittell formed comedy entertainment act Tomfoolery in 1974, which rapidly became a successful comedy show band, topping the bill at South Pier, Blackpool in 1979. Mittell originally performed under his real name, but, as he always had an overdraft, he changed his name to Owen Money. In 1980, Mittell left Tomfoolery, transitioning to a full-time run as a comedian, starting a tradition where members of the band would come and go, which would later include ex-lead singer, Brian Conley.

== 1980 and onwards ==
Owen Money toured the club circuit as a comedian, winning the Club Land "Comedian of the Year" award, performing alongside Shirley Bassey and Tom Jones.

In 1987, Money joined BBC Radio Wales with weekly programme Money for Nothing, which increased in popularity through 1997 to win two gold Sony Radio Awards: one for "Regional Broadcaster of the Year", and the other for "Best Music Sequence Programme of Year". Money for Nothing is presently broadcast every Saturday morning.

Money regularly appears with his band the Travelling Wrinklies, and takes the "Owen Money Laughter Show" to venues around Wales and South West England.

== Film, television and theatre credits ==
=== Television ===
==== As title star ====
- The Tom, Shirley and Owen Money Show (1989, HTV Wales)
- The Owen Money Show (1989, HTV Wales)
- Owen Money and Friends (2013, BBC One Wales)
- Being Owen Money (2017, BBC One Wales)

==== As actor ====
- Rob Brydon's Annually Retentive (2007)

==== As presenter ====
- Just Up Your Street (2000, BBC One Wales)

==== As guest/performer ====
- Whose Coat is That Jacket? (2015, BBC One Wales)
- The Really Welsh Quiz (2015, BBC One Wales)

=== Pantomime appearances ===
- 1990–1991 – Snow White and the Seven Dwarfs (as Clara Voyant), Swansea Grand Theatre
- 1991–1992 – Cinderella (as Baron Hardup), Swansea Grand Theatre
- 1992–1993 – Robinson Crusoe (as Mrs. Crusoe), Swansea Grand Theatre
- 2000–2001 – Aladdin
- 2001–2002 – Cinderella
- 2002–2003 – Jack and the Beanstalk
- 2003–2004 – Dick Whittington
- 2004–2005 – Aladdin
- 2005–2006 – Robinson Crusoe
- 2006–2007 – Peter Pan
- 2007 – Jack and the Beanstalk
- 2007–2008 – Cinderella
- 2008 – Robinson Crusoe (as Billy Crusoe)
- 2009 – Aladdin
- 2010–2011 – Dick Whittington
- 2011–2012 – Peter Pan (as Smee)
- 2012–2013 – Babes in the Wood
- 2013–2014 – Aladdin (as Wishee Washee)
- 2014–2015 – Cinderella
- 2015–2016 – Snow White and the Seven Dwarfs (as Muddles)
- 2016–2017 – Beauty and the Beast (as Willy)
- 2017–2018 – Jack and the Beanstalk (as Tommy Trott)
- 2018–2019 – Peter Pan (as Smee)
- 2019–2020 – Aladdin (as Wishee Washee)
- 2021–2022 – Cinderella (as Baron Hardup)
- 2023–2024 – Snow White and the Seven Dwarfs

== Business interests ==
Money was formerly a director and chairman of Merthyr Tydfil FC, and was instrumental in trying to bring Paul Gascoigne to the club. The Owen Money Theatre Company was created in 2000, with the aim of taking family friendly pantomimes around the theatres of Wales from November to February.

== Personal life ==
Money lives in Porthcawl, and has two children: a son and a daughter, including Katie, who participated on The Voice UK. In his spare time, Money is an avid golfer.

In March 2006, he suffered a minor stroke while at his holiday home in Thailand. He flew back home, and was admitted to Swansea's Morriston Hospital.

Under his given name of Lynn Mittell, Owen Money was awarded an MBE in the Queen's 2007 New Year Honours. The citation reads: "Radio Presenter and Comedy Music Performer. For services to entertainment in Wales".
