= Alexander Cochrane (disambiguation) =

Alexander Cochrane was a Navy commander.

Alexander Cochrane may also refer to:

- Alex Cochrane (footballer) (born 2000), English footballer
- Sandy Cochrane (1900–1967), Scottish footballer

== See also ==
- Alexander Cochran (disambiguation)
- Alexander Baillie-Cochrane, 1st Baron Lamington
