= Gherkin (disambiguation) =

Gherkin is a common name for a pickled cucumber.

Gherkin may also refer to:

- The Gherkin, a skyscraper in the City of London
- Gherkin language, used in the Cucumber software tool

== See also ==
- Gerkin (disambiguation)
- Gerken, a surname
- Gerkens, a surname
- Gurkin, a surname
- Cucumis anguria, commonly known as "bur gherkin" or "West Indian gherkin"
- Melothria scabra, commonly known as "Mexican sour gherkin"
- Jerkin, a man's short close-fitting jacket
