= Albert Monks =

Albert Monks may refer to:

- Albert Monks (footballer, born 1875), English football inside forward for Blackburn Rovers, Bury and Glossop
- Albert Monks (footballer, born 1903), English football goalkeeper for Rochdale

== See also ==
- Albert Monk, Australian trade unionist
