= Mauthausen concentration camp =

Nazi concentration camp in Austria (1938–1945)

Coordinates: 48°15′25″N 14°30′04″E

Mauthausen
- German concentration camp
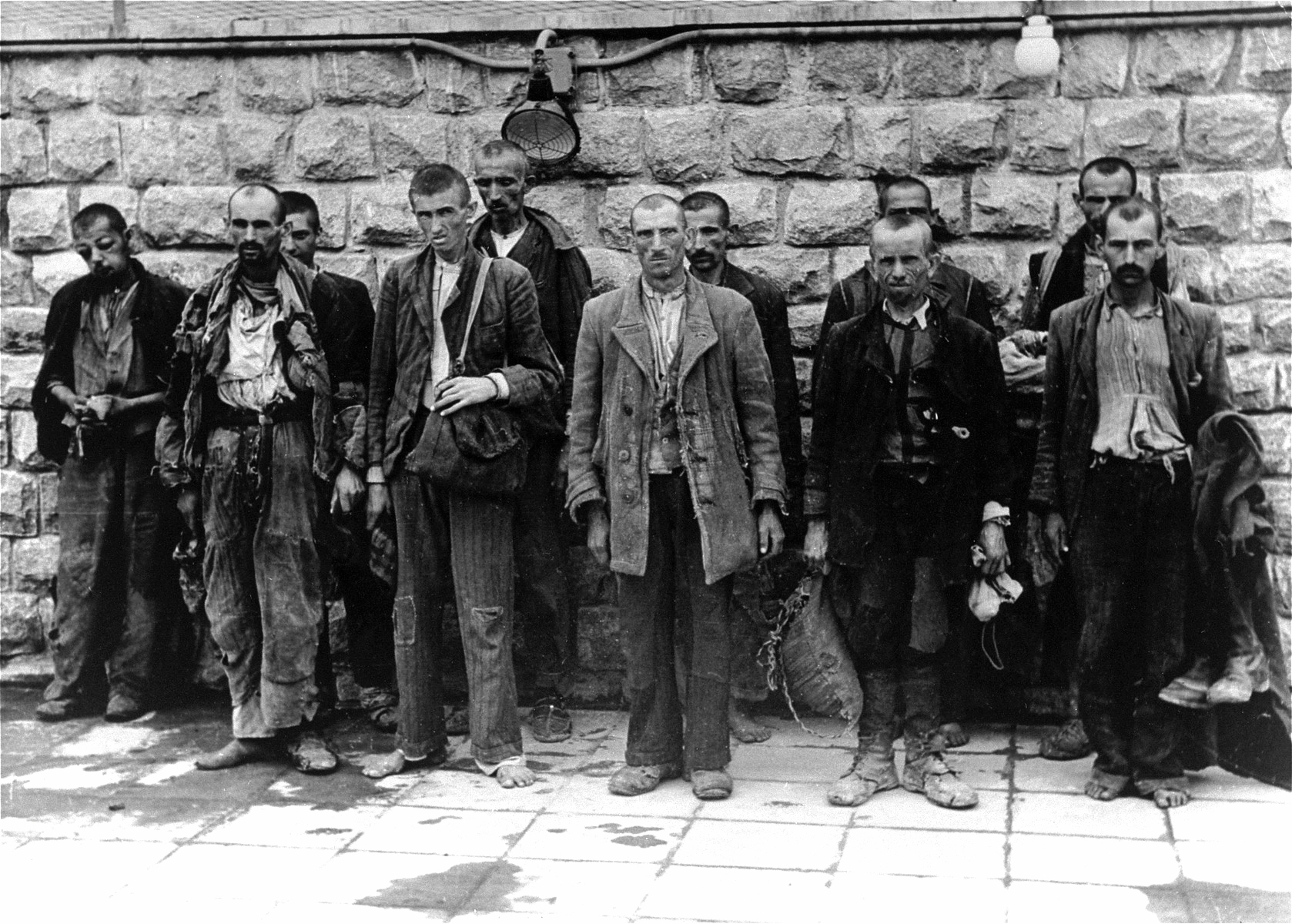
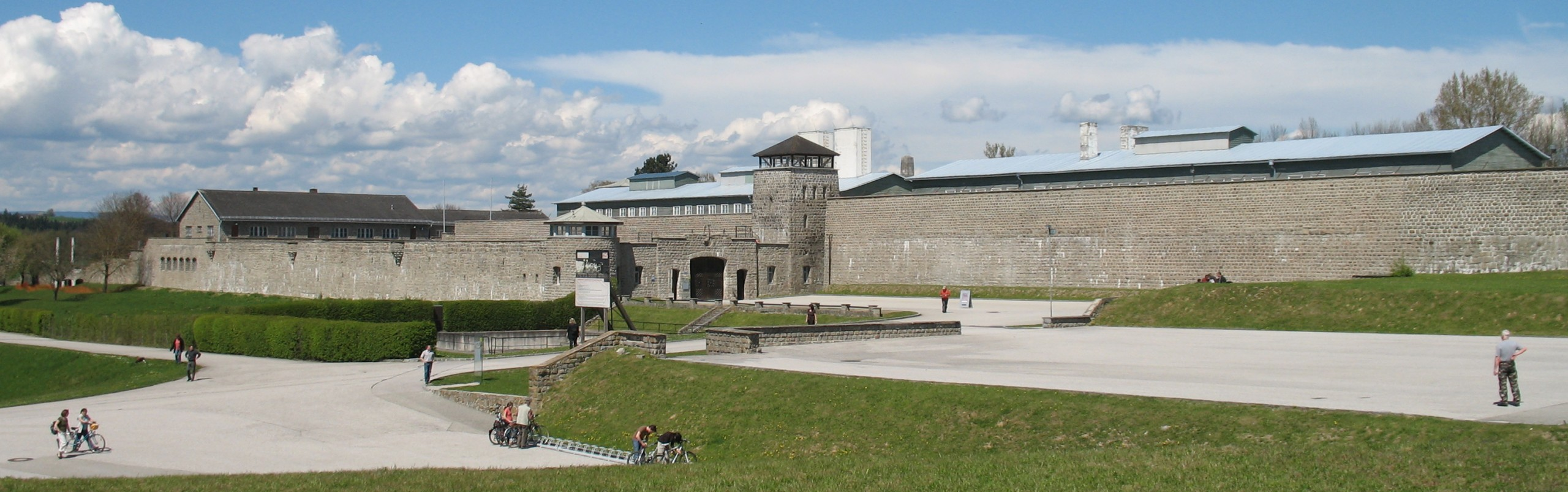
- New arrivals after a weeklong trip in open railway cars Exterior view of the main camp's entrance
- Location: Mauthausen, Upper Austria
- Commandant: Albert Sauer; Franz Ziereis
- Operational: 1938 – May 1945
- Inmates: Political prisoners, Jews, Poles, Soviet POWs
- Number of inmates: 190,000
- Killed: More than 90,000
- Liberated by: United States Army, 5 May 1945

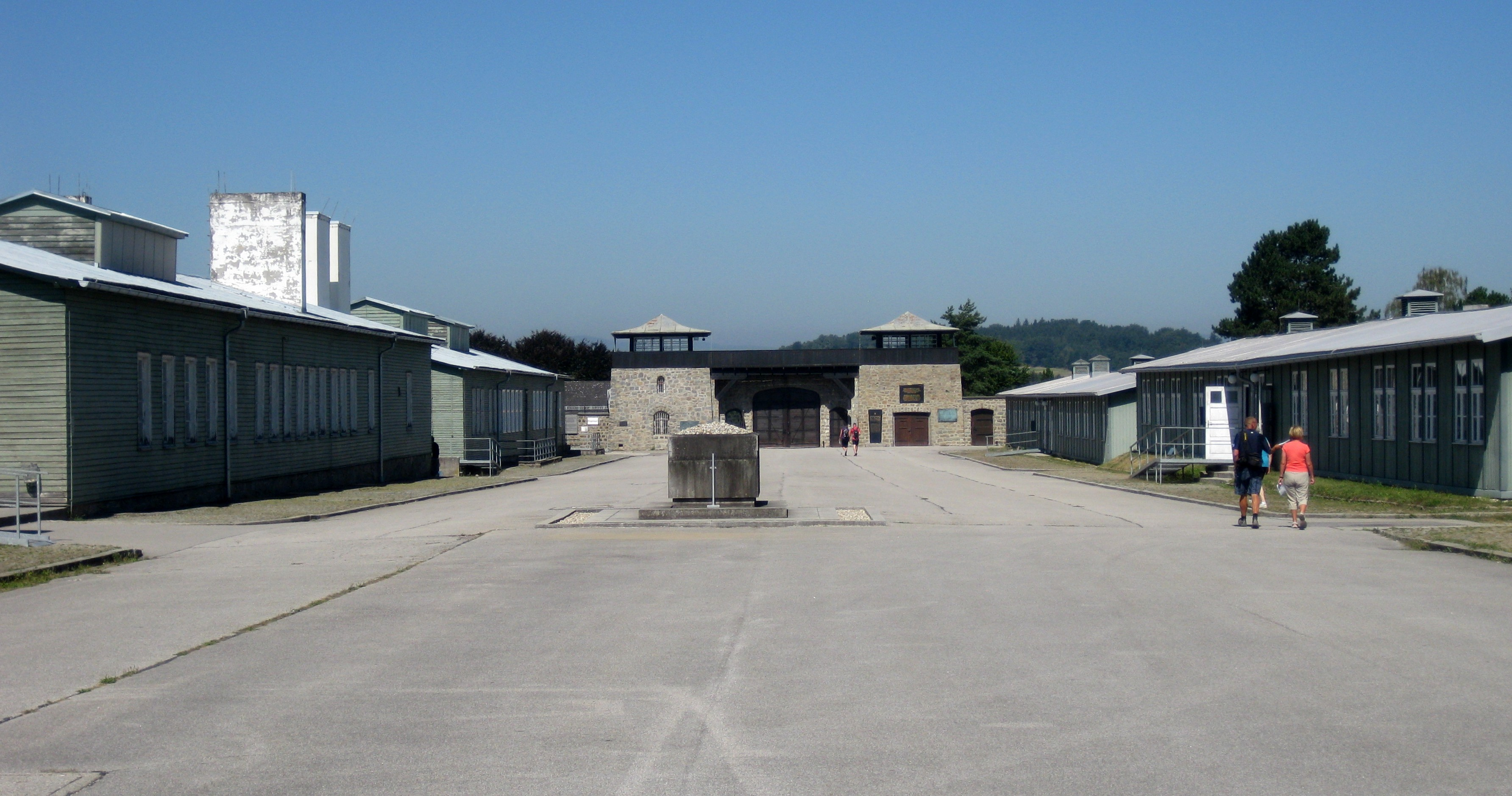
Appellplatz at the Mauthausen main camp

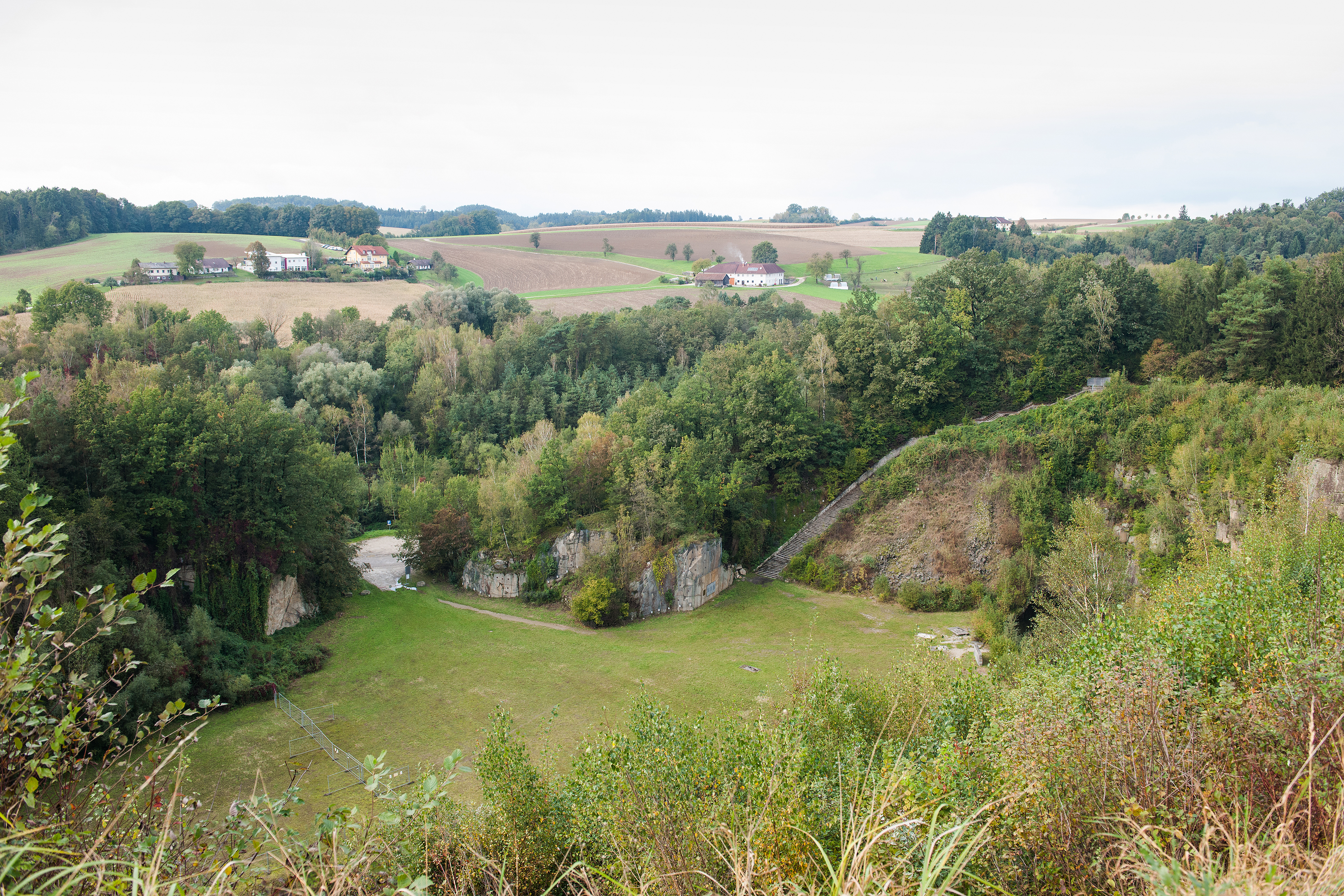
Wiener Graben quarry in 2016, "Stairs of Death" towards the right

Mauthausen was a Nazi concentration camp on a hill above the market town of Mauthausen (roughly 20 kilometres (12 mi) east of Linz) in Upper Austria. It was the main camp of a group with nearly 100 further subcamps located throughout Austria and southern Germany. The Nazi Mauthausen concentration camp was established in 1938 in the same municipality where the Austro-Hungarian WWI POW camp (k.u.k. Kriegsgefangenenlager Mauthausen) had previously operated, holding a total of around 40,000 prisoners, out of whom 8,256 Serbs and up to 5,000 Italians died from 1915 to 1918.

The three Gusen concentration camps in and around the village of St. Georgen/Gusen, just a few kilometers from Mauthausen, held a significant proportion of prisoners within the camp complex, at times exceeding the number of prisoners at the Mauthausen main camp.

The Mauthausen main camp operated from 8 August 1938, several months after the German annexation of Austria, to 5 May 1945, when it was liberated by the United States Army. Starting with the camp at Mauthausen, the number of subcamps expanded over time. In January 1945, the camps contained roughly 85,000 inmates.

As at other Nazi concentration camps, the inmates at Mauthausen and its subcamps were forced to work as slave labor, under conditions that caused many deaths. Mauthausen and its subcamps included quarries, munitions factories, mines, arms factories and plants assembling Me 262 fighter aircraft. The conditions at Mauthausen were even more severe than at most other Nazi concentration camps. Half of the 190,000 inmates died at Mauthausen or its subcamps.

Mauthausen was one of the first massive concentration camp complexes in Nazi Germany, and the last to be liberated by the Allies. The Mauthausen main camp is now a museum.

== Establishment of the main camp ==
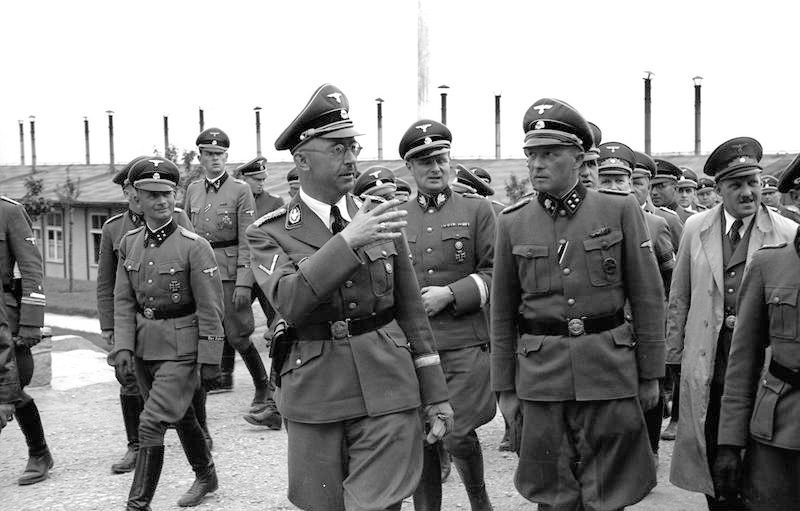
Heinrich Himmler visiting Mauthausen in June 1941. Himmler is talking to Franz Ziereis, camp commandant, with Karl Wolff on the left and August Eigruber on the right.

On 9 August 1938, prisoners from Dachau concentration camp near Munich were sent to the town of Mauthausen in the State of Austria, (Note: The nation of Austria was absorbed into Nazi Germany in the Anschluss of March 1938. The former country was initially called Land Österreich (State of Austria) by the Nazis then later renamed as Ostmark to avoid using the word "Österreich".) to begin building a new slave labor camp. The site was chosen because of the nearby granite quarry and its proximity to Linz. Although the camp was controlled by the German state from the beginning, it was founded by a private company as an economic enterprise.

The owner of the Wiener-Graben quarry (the Marbacher-Bruch and Bettelberg quarries) was a division of Deutsche Erd– und Steinwerke GmbH (DEST) - "German Earth and Stone Works company". DEST was led by Oswald Pohl, who was a high-ranking official of the Schutzstaffel (SS). It rented the quarry sites from the City of Vienna in 1938 and started the construction of the Mauthausen camp. A year later, the company ordered the construction of the first camp at Gusen.

The granite mined in the quarries had previously been used to pave the streets of Vienna, but Nazi authorities envisioned a complete reconstruction of major German towns in accordance with the plans of Albert Speer and other proponents of Nazi architecture, for which large quantities of granite were needed. The money to fund the construction of the Mauthausen camp was gathered from a variety of sources, including commercial loans from Dresdner Bank and Prague-based Böhmische Escompte-Bank; the so-called Reinhardt's fund (meaning money stolen from the inmates of the concentration camps themselves); and from the German Red Cross. (Note: Oswald Pohl, apart from being a high-ranking SS member, owner of DEST and several other companies, and chief of administration and treasurer of various Nazi organizations, was also the managing director of the German Red Cross. In 1938, he transferred 8,000,000 Reichsmarks from member fees to one of the accounts of the SS (SS-Spargemeinschaft e. V.), which in turn donated all the money to DEST in 1939.)

Mauthausen initially served as a strictly-run prison camp for common criminals, prostitutes, and other categories of "Incorrigible Law Offenders". (Note: As stated in Reinhard Heydrich's memo of 1 January 1941.) On 8 May 1939 it was converted to a labour camp for political prisoners.

== Gusen ==
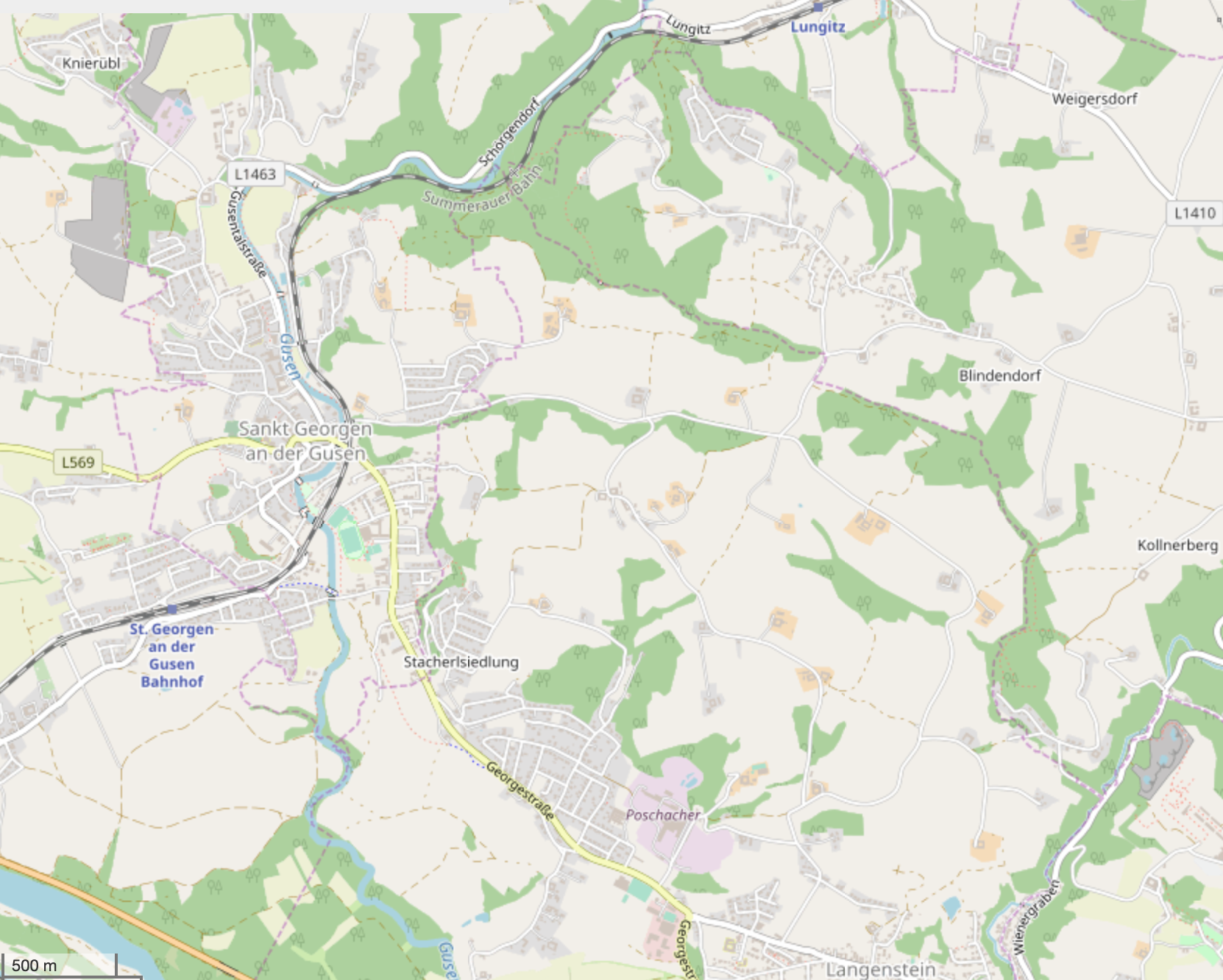

The three Gusen concentration camps held a significant proportion of prisoners within the Mauthausen-Gusen complex. For most of its history, this exceeded the number of prisoners at the Mauthausen main camp itself.

DEST began purchasing land at Sankt Georgen an der Gusen in May 1938. During 1938 and 1939, inmates of the nearby Mauthausen makeshift camp marched daily to the granite quarries at St Georgen/Gusen, which were more productive and more important for DEST than the Wienergraben Quarry. After the German invasion of Poland in September 1939, the as-yet unfinished Mauthausen camp became overcrowded with prisoners. The number of inmates rose from 1,080 in late 1938 to over 3,000 a year later. At about that time, the construction of a new camp "for the Poles" began in Gusen (Langenstein) about 4.5 kilometres (2.8 mi) away after an order by the SS (Schutzstaffel) in December 1939. The new camp (later named Gusen I) became operational in May 1940. The first inmates were put in the first two huts (No. 7 and 8) on 17 April 1940, while the first transport of prisoners – mostly from the camps in Dachau and Sachsenhausen – arrived just over a month later, on 25 May.

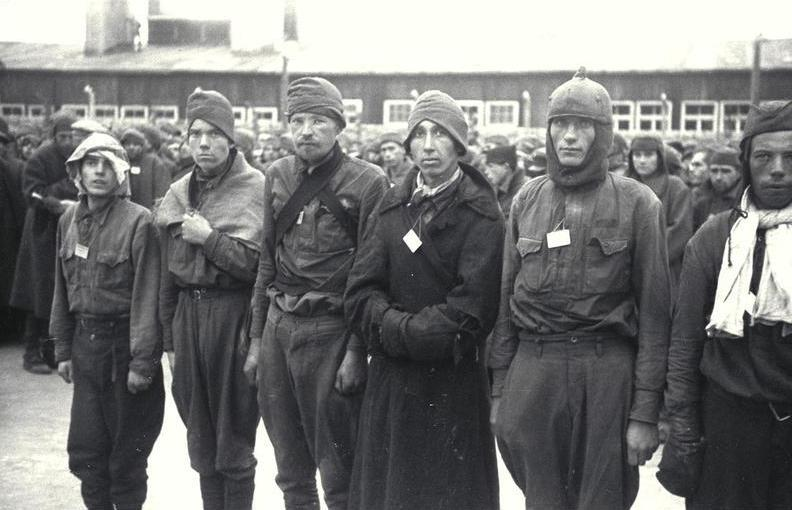
Soviet prisoners of war at Gusen, October 1941

Like nearby Mauthausen, the Gusen camps also rented inmates out to various local businesses as slave labour. In October 1941, several huts were separated from the Gusen subcamp by barbed wire and turned into a separate Prisoner of War Labour Camp (German: Kriegsgefangenenarbeitslager). This camp had many prisoners of war, mostly Red Army officers. By 1942 the production capacity of Mauthausen and the Gusen camps had reached its peak. The Gusen site was expanded to include the central depot of the SS, where various goods seized from occupied territories were sorted and then dispatched to Germany. Local quarries and businesses were in constant need of a new source of labor because more and more Austrians were drafted into the Wehrmacht.

In March 1944, the former SS depot was converted to a new subcamp named Gusen II, which served as an improvised concentration camp until the end of the war. Gusen II contained 12,000 to 17,000 inmates, deprived of even the most basic facilities. In December 1944, Gusen III was opened in nearby Lungitz. Here, parts of a factory infrastructure were converted into the third Gusen camp. The increasing number of subcamps could not keep up with the rising number of inmates, which led to overcrowding of the huts in Mauthausen and its subcamps. From late 1940 to 1944, the number of inmates per bed rose from two to four.

== Subcamps ==
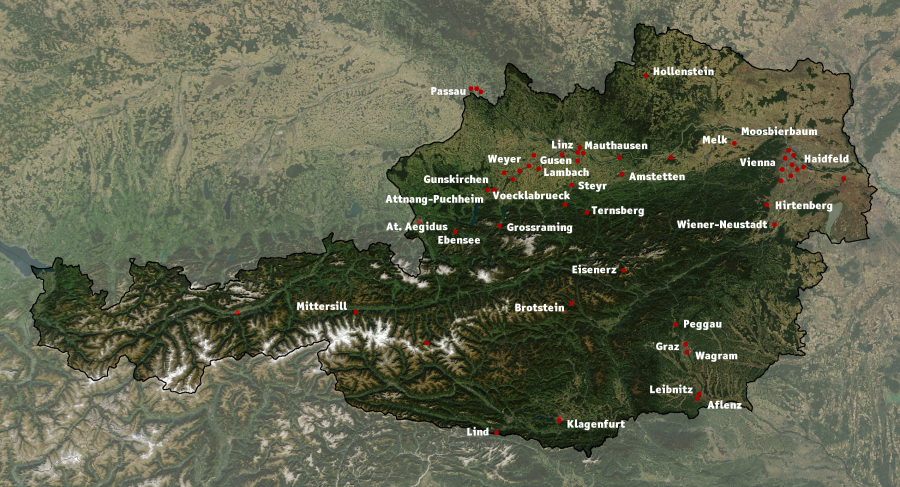
Map showing location of some of the most notable subcamps of Mauthausen

As production in Mauthausen and its subcamps constantly increased, so too did the number of detainees and subcamps. Initially the camps at Gusen and Mauthausen mostly served the local quarries, from 1942 onwards they began to be included in the German war machine. To accommodate the ever-growing number of slave workers, additional subcamps (German: Außenlager) of Mauthausen were built.

By the end of the war, the list included 101 camps (including 49 major subcamps) which covered most of modern Austria, from Mittersill south of Salzburg to Schwechat east of Vienna and from Passau on the prewar Austro-German border to the Loibl Pass on the border with Yugoslavia. The subcamps were divided into several categories, depending on their main function: Produktionslager for factory workers, Baulager for construction, Aufräumlager for clearing the rubble in Allied-bombed towns, and Kleinlager (small camps) where the inmates worked specifically for the SS.

== Forced labour ==
=== Labour in private factories ===
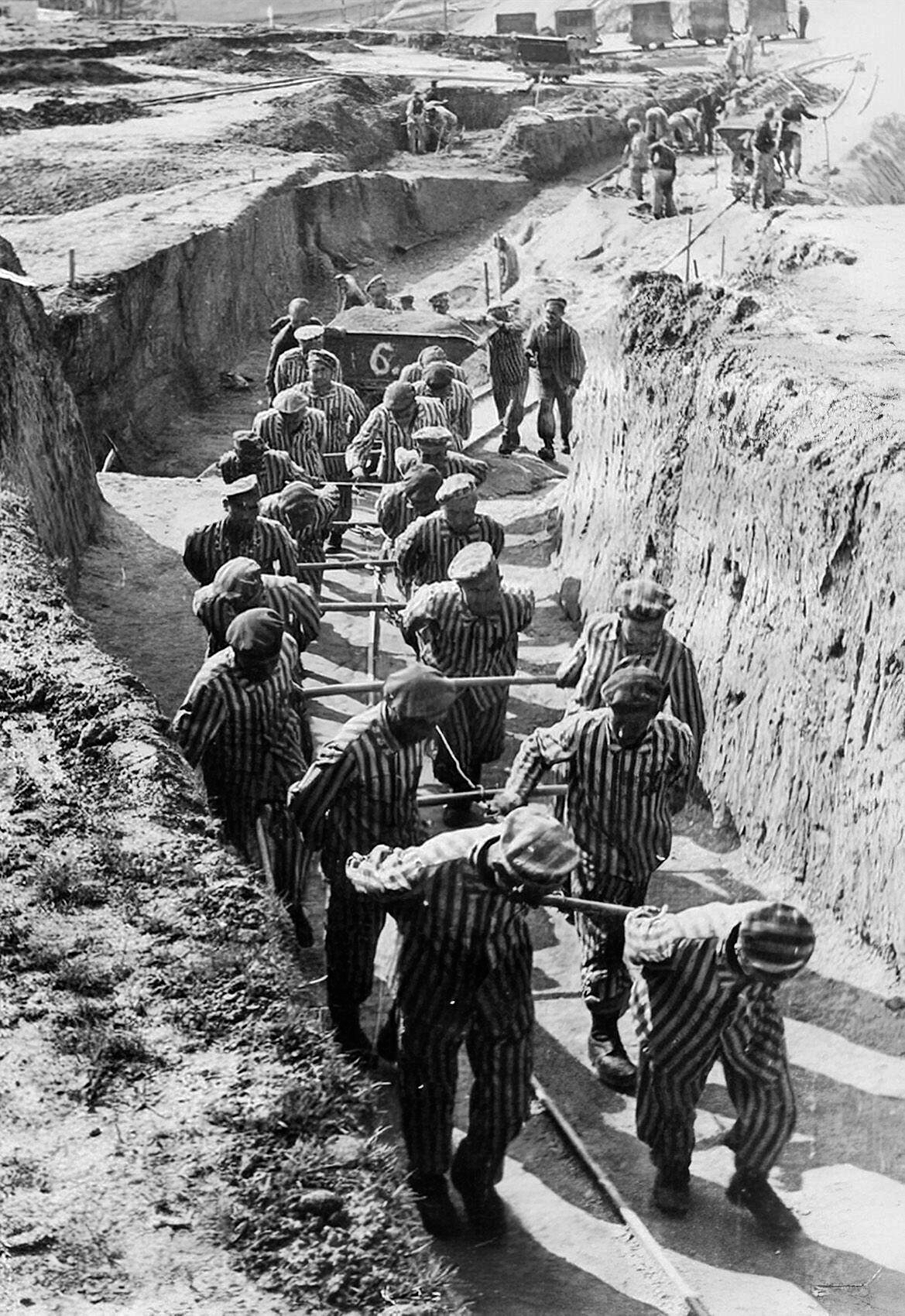
Prisoners hauling earth for the construction of the "Russian camp" at Mauthausen

The production output of Mauthausen and its subcamps exceeded that of each of the five other large slave labor centers: Auschwitz-Birkenau, Flossenbürg, Gross-Rosen, Marburg and Natzweiler-Struthof, in terms of both production quota and profits. The list of companies using slave labor from Mauthausen and its subcamps was long, and included both national corporations and small, local firms and communities. Some parts of the quarries were converted into a Mauser machine pistol assembly plant.

In 1943, an underground factory for the Steyr-Daimler-Puch company was built in Gusen. Altogether, 45 larger companies took part in making Mauthausen and its subcamps one of the most profitable concentration camps of Nazi Germany, with more than 11,000,000 ℛ︁ℳ︁ in profits in 1944 alone (EUR 86.7 million in 2021). (Note: 11,000,000 Reichsmark was equivalent to roughly 4,403,000 US dollars or almost one million sterling by 1939 exchange rates; In turn, 4,403,000 1939 dollars are roughly equivalent to 560,370,000 modern US dollars using the relative share of GDP as the main factor of comparison, or 102 million using the consumer price index.) The companies using slave laborers from Mauthausen included:

- DEST cartel (producing bricks and quarrying stone for German state construction projects)
- Accumulatoren-Fabrik AFA (the main producer of batteries for German U-boats)
- Bayer (the main German producer of medicines and medications)
- Deutsche Bergwerks- und Hüttenbau (constructing mines and quarries)
- Linz-based Eisenwerke Oberdonau (the largest World War II steel supplier for the German Panzer tanks)
- Flugmotorenwerke Ostmark (aeroplane engine manufacturer)
- Nibelungenwerk (the largest tank factory in Nazi Germany)
- Otto Eberhard Patronenfabrik (munitions works)
- Heinkel and Messerschmitt (Heinkel-Sud facilities in Floridsdorf, Vienna-Schwechat and Zwölfaxing, and other airplane factories, also a V-2 rocket factory)
- Österreichische Sauerwerks (arms producer)
- Rax-Werke (machinery and V-2 rockets)
- Steyr-Daimler-Puch (arms and vehicles)
- Hochtief (construction of tunnels in the Loibl Pass)

Prisoners were also rented out as slave labor to work on local farms, road construction, reinforcing and repairing the banks of the Danube, constructing large residential areas in Sankt Georgen, and excavating archaeological sites in Spielberg.

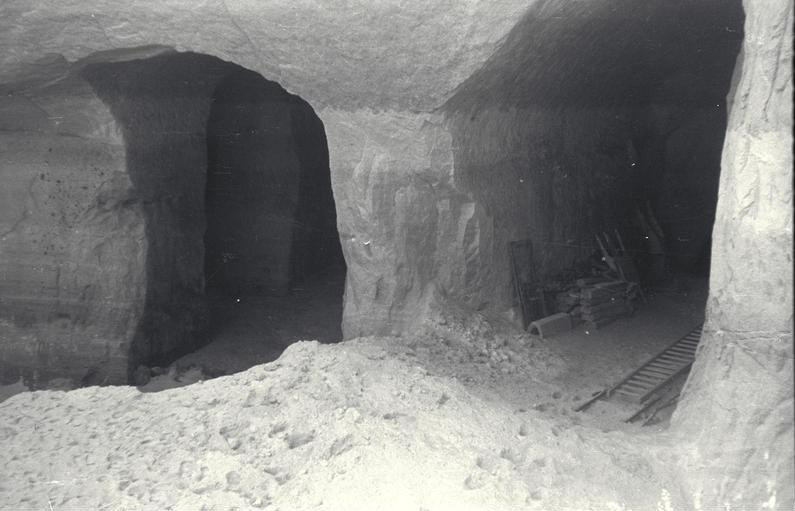
The Bergkristall tunnel system at Gusen was built to protect Me 262 production from air raids.

When the Allied strategic bombing campaign started to target the German war industry, German planners decided to move production to underground facilities that were impenetrable to enemy aerial bombardment. In Gusen I, the prisoners were ordered to build several large tunnels beneath the hills surrounding the camp (code-named Kellerbau). By the end of World War II the prisoners had dug 29,400 square metres (316,000 sq ft) to house a small-arms factory.

In January 1944, similar tunnels were also built beneath the village of Sankt Georgen by the inmates of Gusen II subcamp (code-named Bergkristall). They dug roughly 50,000 square metres (540,000 sq ft) so the Messerschmitt company could build an assembly plant to produce the Messerschmitt Me 262 and V-2 rockets. In addition to planes, some 7,000 square metres (75,000 sq ft) of Gusen II tunnels served as factories for various war materials. In late 1944, roughly 11,000 of the Gusen I and II inmates were working in underground facilities. An additional 6,500 worked on expanding the underground network of tunnels and halls.

In 1945, the Me 262 works was already finished and the Germans could potentially assemble 1,250 planes a month. (Note: In reality the actual production never reached such levels.) This was the second largest plane factory in Germany after the Mittelbau-Dora concentration camp, which was also underground.

=== Weapons research ===
In January 2015, a "panel of archaeologists, historians and other experts" ruled out the earlier claims of an Austrian filmmaker that a bunker underneath the camp was connected to the German nuclear weapon project. The panel indicated that stairs uncovered during an excavation prompted by the allegations led to an SS shooting range.

=== Extermination ===
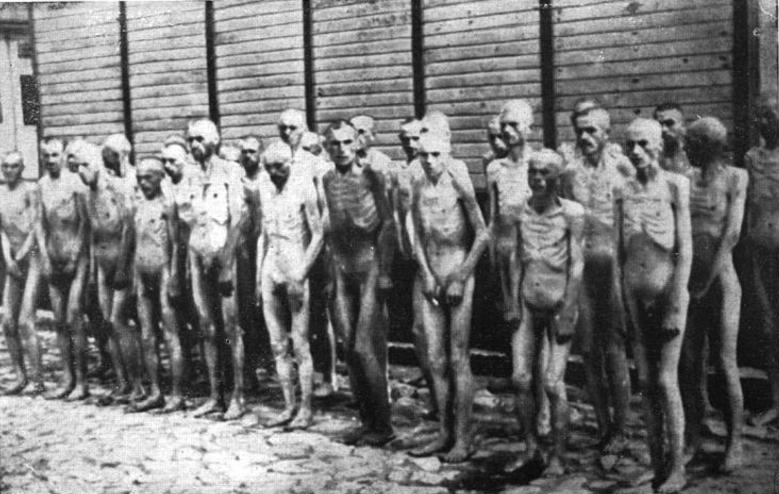
Soviet POWs standing before one of the huts in Mauthausen

The political function of the camp continued in parallel with its economic role. Until at least 1942, it was used for the imprisonment and murder of the Nazis' political and ideological enemies, real and imagined. Initially, the camp did not have a gas chamber of its own and the so-called Muselmänner, or prisoners who were too sick to work, after being maltreated, under-nourished or exhausted, were then transferred to other concentration camps for extermination (mostly to the Hartheim Euthanasia Centre, which was 40.7 kilometres or 25.3 miles away), or killed by lethal injection and cremated in the local crematorium. The growing number of prisoners made this system too expensive and from 1940, Mauthausen was one of the few camps in the West to use a gas chamber on a regular basis. In the beginning, an improvised mobile gas chamber – a van with the exhaust pipe connected to the inside – shuttled between Mauthausen and Gusen. It was capable of killing about 120 prisoners at a time when it was completed.

== Inmates ==
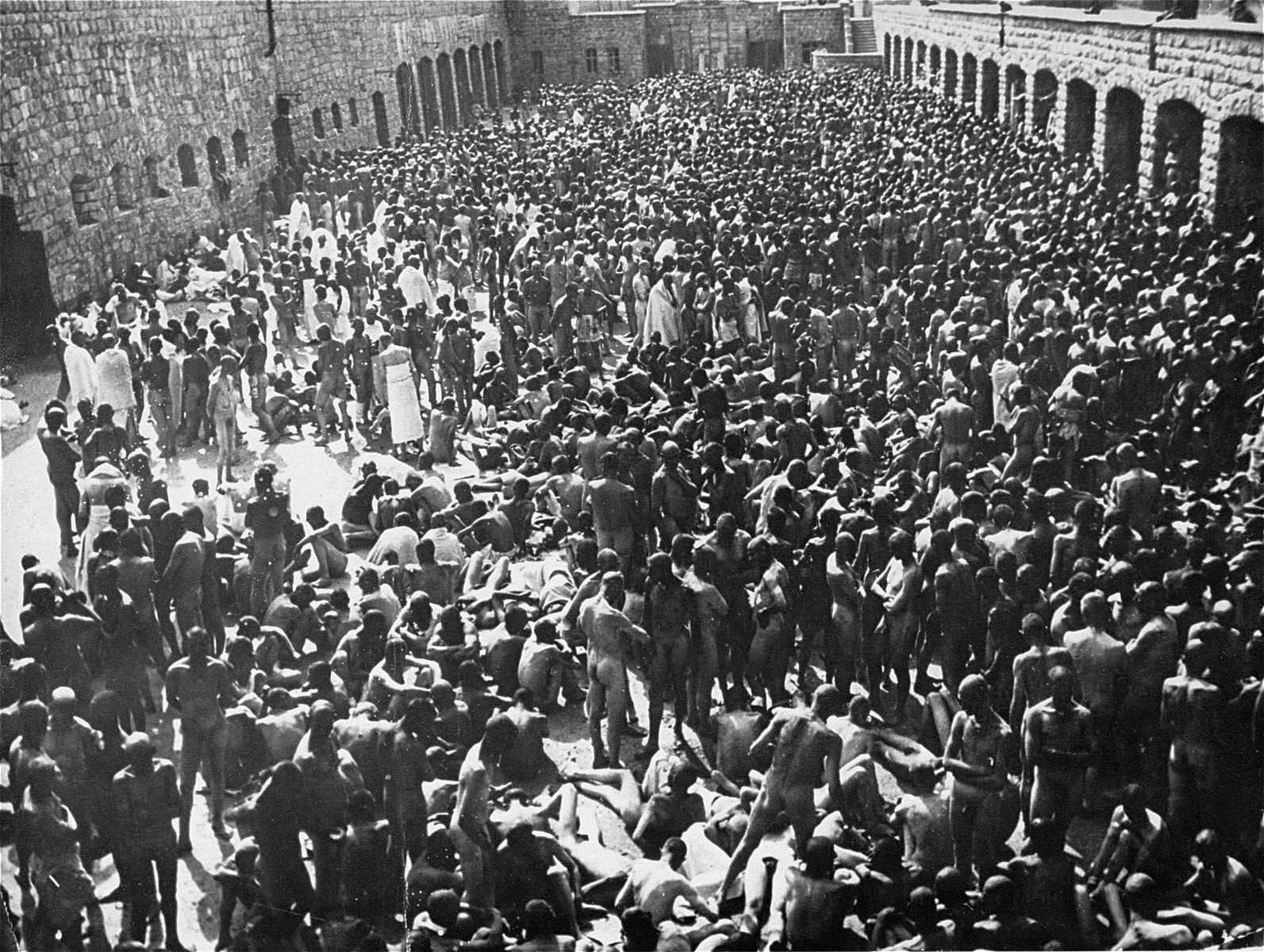
New prisoners awaiting disinfection in the garage yard of Mauthausen

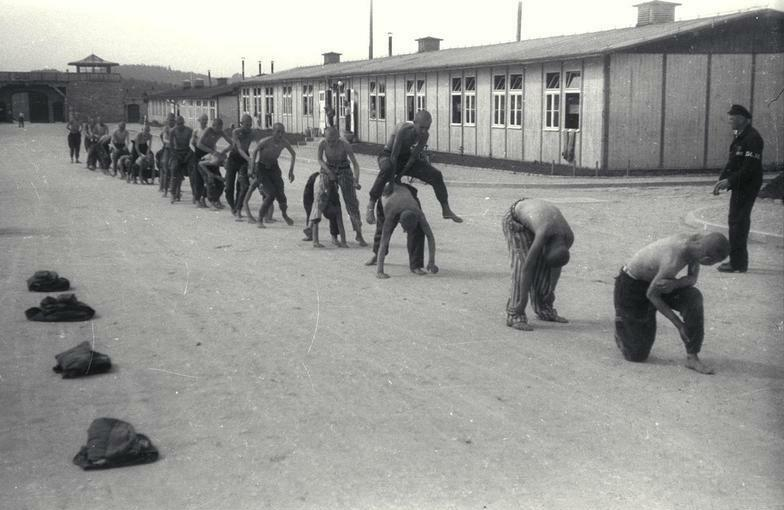
Grueling and pointless physical exercise was one of the methods of "wearing the inmates down". Here a group of prisoners are forced to play "leap frog".

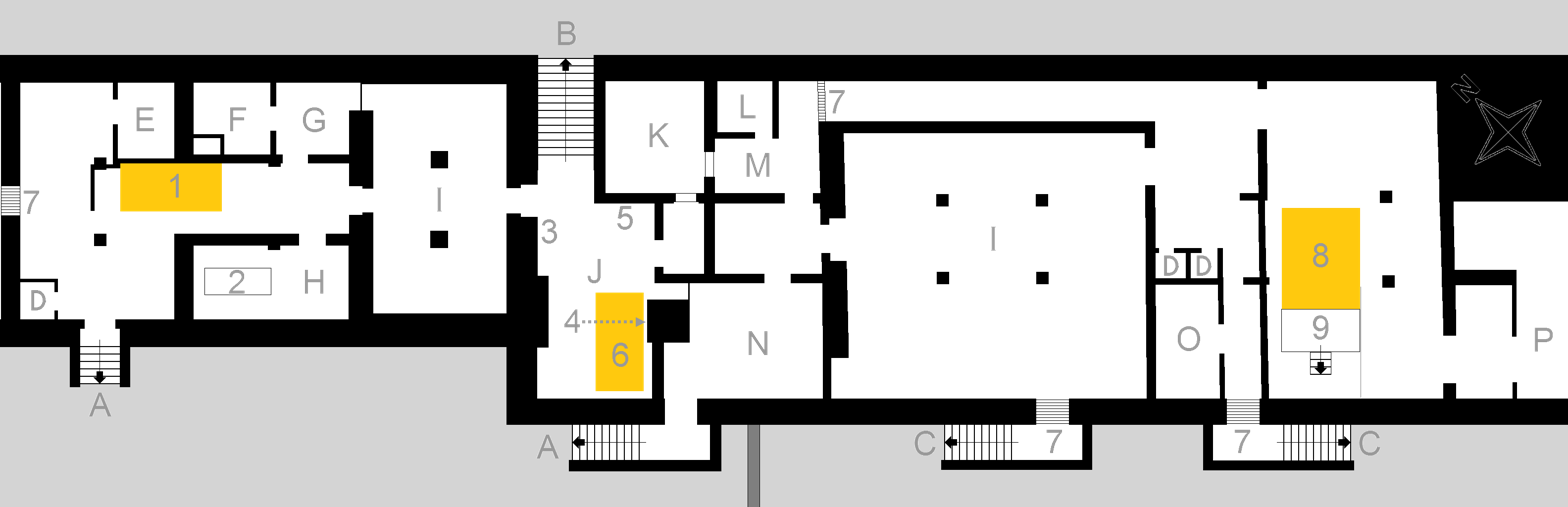
Floor plan of the "execution cellar", located beneath the Arrest Block and the Infirmary Block: E– lounge and washroom for prisoners; F– SS duty room; H– dissecting room; I– mortuaries; J– execution room; K– gas chamber; 1– cremation oven no. 1; 2 – dissecting table; 3– gallows; 4,5– neck shooting installations; 6– cremation oven no. 2; 8– cremation oven no. 3.

Until early 1940, the largest group of inmates consisted of German, Austrian and Czechoslovak socialists, communists, homosexuals, anarchists and people of Romani origin. Other groups of people to be persecuted solely on religious grounds were the Sectarians, as they were dubbed by the Nazi regime, meaning Bible Students, or as they are called today, Jehovah's Witnesses. The reason for their imprisonment was their rejection of giving the loyalty oath to Hitler and their refusal to participate in any kind of military service.

In early 1940, many Poles were transferred to the Mauthausen–Gusen complex. The first groups were mostly composed of artists, scientists, Boy Scouts, teachers, and university professors, who were arrested during Intelligenzaktion and the course of the AB Action. Camp Gusen II was called by Germans Vernichtungslager für die polnische Intelligenz ("Extermination camp for the Polish intelligentsia").

Later in the war, new arrivals were from every category of the "unwanted", but educated people and so-called political prisoners constituted the largest part of all inmates until the end of the war. During World War II, large groups of Spanish Republicans were also transferred to Mauthausen and its subcamps. Most of them were former Republican soldiers or activists who had fled to France after Francisco Franco's victory in the Spanish Civil War and then were captured by German forces after the defeat of France in 1940 or handed over to the Germans by the Vichy authorities. The largest of these groups arrived at Gusen in January 1941. On 24 August 1940, a cattle train from Angoulême with 927 Spanish refugees onboard arrived at Mauthausen. The group believed that they were being taken to Vichy. Of the 490 males, those over the age of 13 were separated from their families and taken to the extermination camp nearby. 357 of the 490 would die in the camp. The remaining women and children were then sent back to Spain.

In early 1941, almost all the Poles and Spaniards, except for a small group of specialists working in the quarry's stone mill, were transferred from Mauthausen to Gusen. Following the outbreak of the Soviet-German War in 1941, the camps started to receive a large number of Soviet POWs. Most of them were kept in huts separated from the rest of the camp. The Soviet prisoners of war were a major part of the first groups to be gassed in the newly built gas chamber in early 1942. In 1944, a large group of Hungarian and Dutch Jews, about 8,000 people altogether, was also transferred to the camp. Much like all the other large groups of prisoners that were transferred to Mauthausen and its subcamps, most of them either died as a result of the hard labor and poor conditions, or were deliberately killed.

After the Nazi invasion of Yugoslavia in April 1941 and the outbreak of the partisan resistance in summer of the same year, many people suspected of aiding the Yugoslav resistance were sent to the Mauthausen camp, mostly from areas under direct German occupation, namely northern Slovenia and Serbia. An estimated 1,500 Slovenes died in Mauthausen.

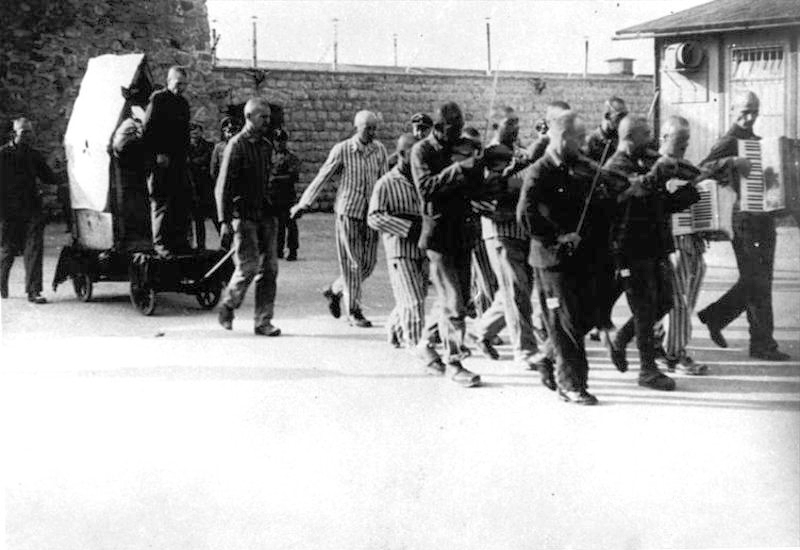
Hans Bonarewitz being taken to his execution after escaping and being recaptured on 7 July 1942

Throughout the years of World War II, the Mauthausen and its subcamps received new prisoners in smaller transports daily, mostly from other concentration camps in German-occupied Europe. Most of the prisoners at the subcamps of Mauthausen had been kept in a number of different detention sites before they arrived. The most notable of such centers for Mauthausen and its subcamps were the camps at Dachau and Auschwitz. The first transports from Auschwitz arrived in February 1942. The second transport in June of that year was much larger and numbered some 1,200 prisoners. Similar groups were sent from Auschwitz to Gusen and Mauthausen in April and November 1943, and then in January and February 1944. Finally, after Adolf Eichmann visited Mauthausen in May of that year, Mauthausen received the first group of roughly 8,000 Hungarian Jews from Auschwitz; the first group to be evacuated from that camp before the Soviet advance. Initially, the groups evacuated from Auschwitz consisted of qualified workers for the ever-growing industry of Mauthausen and its subcamps, but as the evacuation proceeded other categories of people were also transported to Mauthausen, Gusen, Vienna or Melk.

Subcamp inmate counts Late 1944 – early 1945 (Note: The subcamp inmate counts refer to the situation in late 1944 and early 1945, before the major reorganization of the camp's system and before the arrival of a large number of evacuation trains and death marches.)
Gusen I, II, III	26,311
Ebensee	18,437
Gunskirchen	15,000
Melk	10,314
Linz	6,690
Amstetten	2,966
Wiener-Neudorf	2,954
Schwechat	2,568
Steyr-Münichholz	1,971
Schlier-Redl-Zipf	1,488

Over time, Auschwitz had to almost stop accepting new prisoners and most were directed to Mauthausen instead. The last group – roughly 10,000 prisoners – was evacuated in the last wave in January 1945, only a few weeks before the Soviet liberation of the Auschwitz-Birkenau complex. Among them was a large group of civilians arrested by the Germans after the failure of the Warsaw Uprising, but by the liberation not more than 500 of them were still alive. Altogether, during the final months of the war, 23,364 prisoners from other concentration camps arrived at the camp complex. Many more perished from exhaustion during death marches, or in railway wagons, where the prisoners were confined at sub-zero temperatures for several days before their arrival, without adequate food or water. Prisoner transports were considered less important than other important services, and could be kept on sidings for days as other trains passed.

Many of those who survived the journey died before they could be registered, whilst others were given the camp numbers of prisoners who had already been killed. Most were then accommodated in the camps or in the newly established tent camp (German: Zeltlager) just outside the Mauthausen subcamp, where roughly 2,000 people were forced into tents intended for not more than 800 inmates, and then starved to death.

As in all other Nazi concentration camps, not all the prisoners were equal. Their treatment depended largely on the category assigned to each inmate, as well as their nationality and rank within the system. The so-called kapos, or prisoners who had been recruited by their captors to police their fellow prisoners, were given more food and higher pay in the form of concentration camp coupons which could be exchanged for cigarettes in the canteen, as well as a separate room inside most barracks. On Himmler's order of June 1941, a brothel was opened in the Mauthausen and Gusen I camps in 1942. The Kapos formed the main part of the so-called Prominents (German: Prominenz), or prisoners who were given a much better treatment than the average inmate.

"If there is a God, he will have to beg my forgiveness." (German: "Wenn es einen Gott gibt muß er mich um Verzeihung bitten")

— Unknown victim of the Holocaust, carved into the wall of a Mauthausen cell

=== Women and children in Mauthausen ===
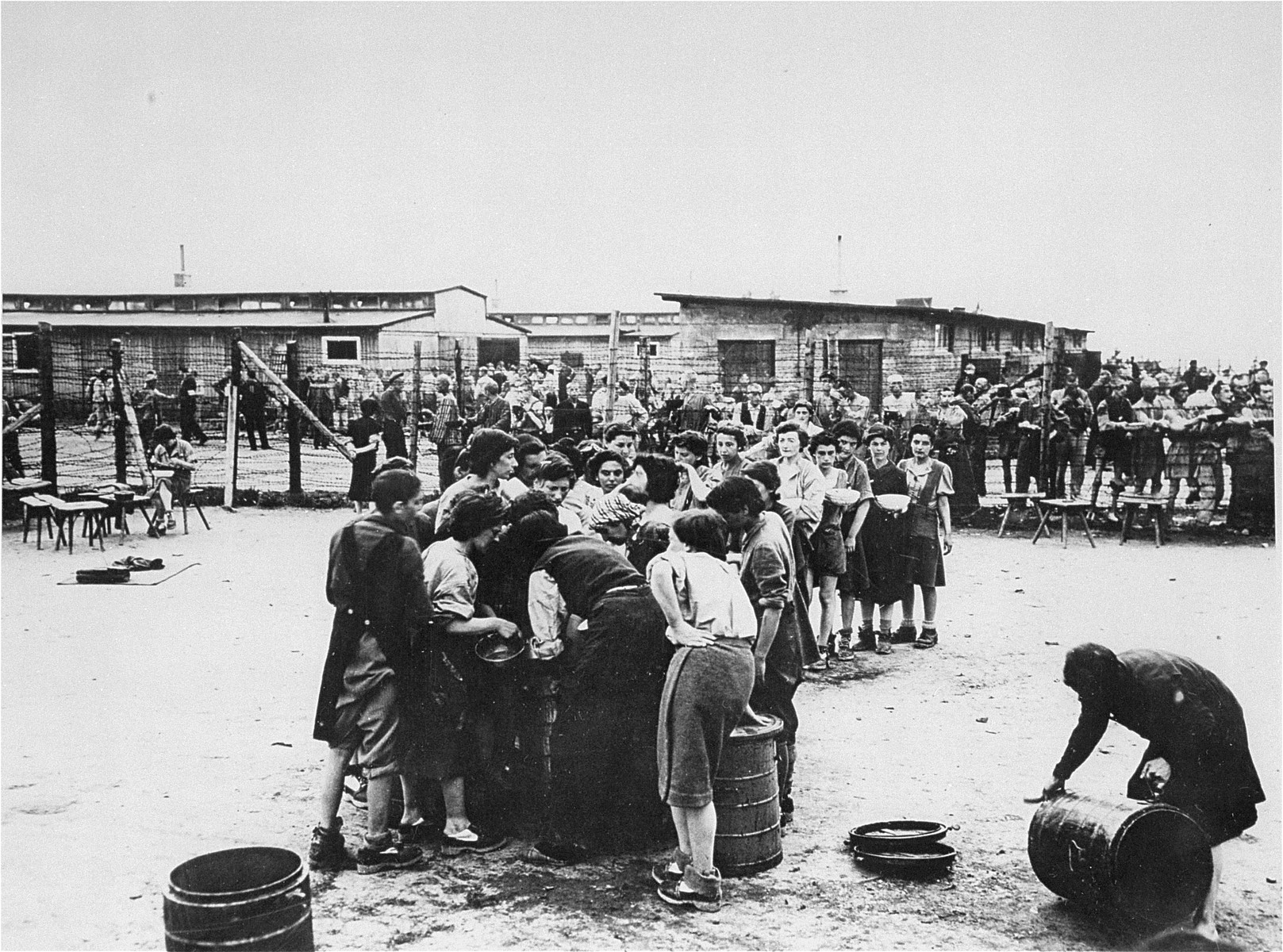
Women's camp at Mauthausen after liberation

Although the Mauthausen camp complex was mostly a labor camp for men, a women's camp was opened in Mauthausen, in September 1944, with the first transport of female prisoners from Auschwitz. Eventually, more women and children came to Mauthausen from Ravensbrück, Bergen-Belsen, Gross-Rosen, and Buchenwald. Along with the female prisoners came some female guards; 20 are known to have served in the Mauthausen camp, and 60 in the whole camp complex. Holocaust Survivor, Eva Clarke was born at the camp and liberated 3-weeks later by Eisenhower's US army Forces.

Female guards also staffed the Mauthausen subcamps at Hirtenberg, Lenzing (the main women's subcamp in Austria), and Sankt Lambrecht. The Chief Overseers at Mauthausen were firstly Margarete Freinberger, and then Jane Bernigau. Almost all the female Overseers who served in Mauthausen were recruited from Austrian cities and towns between September and November 1944. In early April 1945, at least 2,500 more female prisoners came from the female subcamps at Amstetten, St. Lambrecht, Hirtenberg, and the Flossenbürg subcamp at Freiberg. According to Daniel Patrick Brown, Hildegard Lächert also served at Mauthausen.

The available Mauthausen inmate statistics from the spring of 1943, shows that there were 2,400 prisoners below the age of 20, which was 12.8% of the 18,655 population. By late March 1945, the number of juvenile prisoners in Mauthausen increased to 15,048, which was 19.1% of the 78,547 Mauthausen inmates. The number of imprisoned children increased 6.2 times, whereas the total number of adult prisoners during the same period multiplied by a factor of only four.

These numbers reflected the increasing use of Polish, Czech, Soviet, and Balkan teenagers as slave labor as the war continued. Statistics showing the composition of juvenile inmates shortly before their liberation reveal the following major child/prisoner sub-groups: 5,809 foreign civilian laborers, 5,055 political prisoners, 3,654 Jews, and 330 Russian POWs. There were also 23 Romani children, 20 so-called "anti-social elements", six Spaniards, and three Jehovah's Witnesses.

=== Treatment of inmates and methodology of crime ===
Mauthausen was one of the most brutal and severe of the Nazi concentration camps; prisoners at Dachau considered themselves fortunate not to be at a death camp like Mauthausen. Inmates suffered not only from malnutrition, overcrowded huts and constant abuse and beatings by the guards and kapos, but also from exceptionally hard labor.

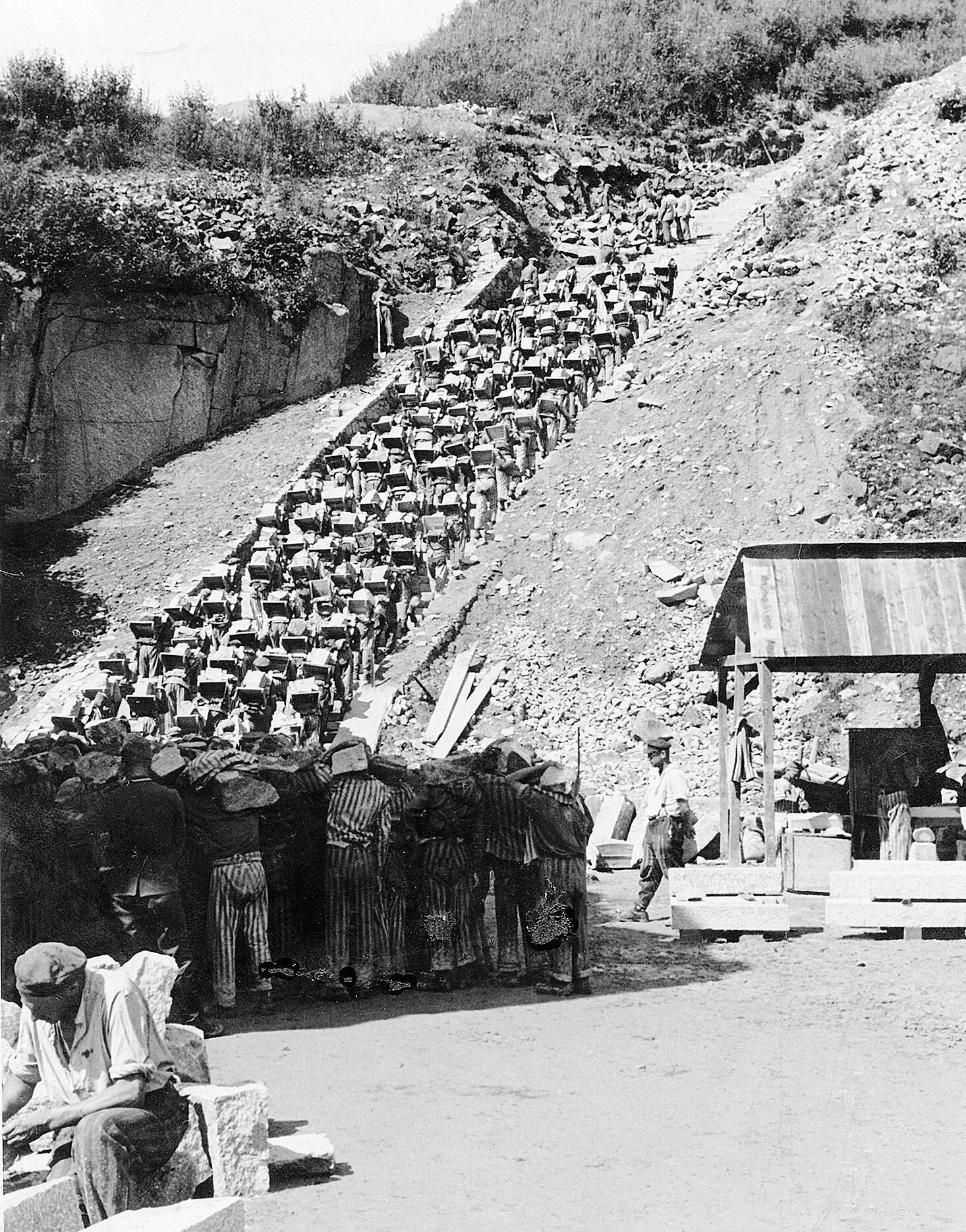
"Stairs of Death": prisoners forced to carry a granite block up 186 steps to the top of the quarry

The work in the quarries – often in unbearable heat or in temperatures as low as −30 °C (−22 °F) – led to exceptionally high mortality rates. (Note: It is often mentioned that the mortality rate reached 58% in 1941, as compared with 36% at Dachau, and 19% at Buchenwald over the same period. Dobosiewicz – who made the most extensive study – compared various factors: his estimations were based on the number of prisoners to arrive in a year as compared to the number of that were murdered during a year.) The food rations were limited, and during the 1940–1942 period, an average inmate weighed 40 kilograms (88 lb). It is estimated that the average energy content of food rations dropped from about 1,750 calories (7,300 kJ) a day during the 1940–1942 period, to between 1,150 and 1,460 calories (4,800 and 6,100 kJ) a day during the next period. In 1945 the energy content was even lower and did not exceed 600 to 1,000 calories (2,500 to 4,200 kJ) a day – less than a third of the energy needed by an average worker in heavy industry. The reduced rations led to the starvation of thousands of inmates.

The rock quarry in Mauthausen was at the base of the "Stairs of Death". Prisoners were forced to carry roughly-hewn blocks of stone – often weighing as much as 50 kilograms (110 lb) – up the 186 stairs, one prisoner behind the other. As a result, many exhausted prisoners collapsed in front of the other prisoners in the line, and then fell on top of the other prisoners, creating a domino effect; the first prisoner falling onto the next, and so on, all the way down the stairs. In the quarry, prisoners were forced to carry the boulders from morning until night, whipped by Nazi guards.

The inmates of Mauthausen, Gusen I, and Gusen II had access to a separate part of the camp for the sick – the so-called Krankenlager. Despite the fact that (roughly) 100 medics from among the inmates were working there, they were not given any medication and could offer only basic first aid. Thus the hospital camp – as it was called by the German authorities – was, in fact, a "hospital" only in name.

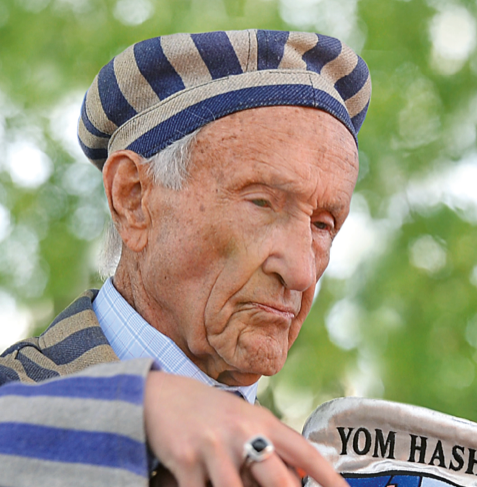
Edward Mosberg

Such brutality was not accidental. Former prisoner Edward Mosberg said: "If you stopped for a moment, the SS either shot you or pushed you off the cliff to your death." The SS guards would often force prisoners – exhausted from hours of hard labor without sufficient food and water – to race up the stairs carrying blocks of stone. Those who survived the ordeal would often be placed in a line-up at the edge of a cliff known as "The Parachutists' Wall" (German: Fallschirmspringerwand). At gunpoint, each prisoner would have the option of being shot or pushing the prisoner in front of him off the cliff. Other common methods of extermination of prisoners who were either sick, unfit for further labor, or as a means of collective responsibility, or after escape attempts, included beating the prisoners to death by the SS guards and Kapos, starving to death in bunkers, hangings, and mass shootings.

At times the guards or Kapos would either deliberately throw the prisoners on the 380-volt electric barbed wire fence, or force them outside the boundaries of the camp and then shoot them on the pretense that they were attempting to escape. Another method of extermination were icy showers – some 3,000 inmates died of hypothermia after having been forced to take an icy cold shower and then left outside in cold weather. A large number of inmates were drowned in barrels of water at Gusen II.

The Nazis also performed pseudo-scientific experiments on the prisoners. Among the doctors to organize them were Sigbert Ramsauer, Karl Josef Gross, Eduard Krebsbach and Aribert Heim. Heim was dubbed "Doctor Death" by the inmates; he was in Gusen for seven weeks, which was enough to carry out his experiments.

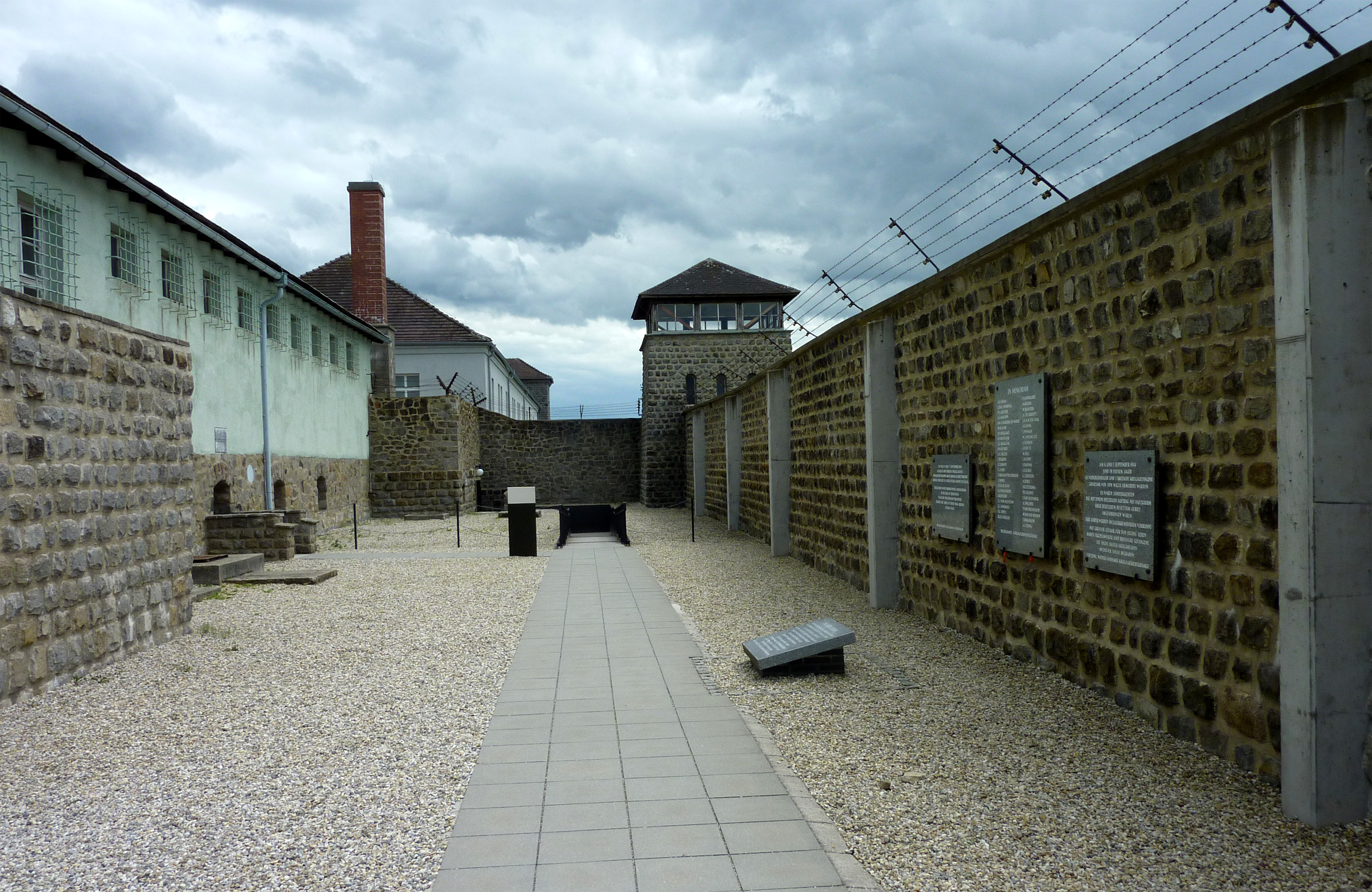
Mauthausen concentration camp, memorial plaques behind the Prison Block marking the spot where the ashes of the executed Englandspiel SOE agents are buried

Kapo and camp resistance member Hans Maršálek estimated that an average life expectancy of newly arrived prisoners in Gusen varied from six months between 1940 and 1942, to less than three months in early 1945. Paradoxically, with the growth of forced labor industry in various subcamps of Mauthausen, the situation of some of the prisoners improved significantly. While the food rations were increasingly limited every month, the heavy industry necessitated skilled specialists rather than unqualified workers and the brutality of the camp's SS and Kapos was limited. While the prisoners were still beaten on a daily basis and the Muselmänner were still exterminated, from early 1943 on some of the factory workers were allowed to receive food parcels from their families (mostly Poles and Frenchmen). This allowed many of them not only to evade the risk of starvation, but also to help other prisoners who had no relatives outside the camps – or who were not allowed to receive parcels.

In February 1945, the camp was the site of the Nazi war crime Mühlviertler Hasenjagd ("hare hunt") where around 500 escaped prisoners (mostly Soviet officers) were mercilessly hunted down and murdered by SS, local law enforcement and civilians.

=== Death toll ===
Fourteen Czech intellectuals shot by the SS in Mauthausen, 1942

The Germans destroyed much of the camp's files and evidence and often allocated newly arrived prisoners the camp numbers of those who had already been killed, so the exact death toll of Mauthausen and its subcamps is impossible to calculate. The matter is further complicated due to some of the inmates of Gusen being murdered in Mauthausen, and at least 3,423 were sent to Hartheim Castle, 40.7 km (25.3 mi) away. Overall, more than 90,000 of the 190,000 people deported to Mauthausen died there or in one of its subcamps.

== Staff ==
SS Captain Albert Sauer presided over the initial establishment of the camp on 1 August 1938 and remained camp commandant until 17 February 1939. Franz Ziereis assumed control as commandant of the Mauthausen concentration camp from 1939 until the camp was liberated by the American forces in 1945. The infamous Death's-Head Unit or SS-Totenkopfverbände charged with guarding the camp perimeter in addition to work detachments was headed by Georg Bachmayer, a captain in the SS. Further records of camp leadership were destroyed by Nazi officials in effort to cover up war atrocities and those involved.

Several Norwegian Waffen SS volunteers worked as guards or as instructors for prisoners from Nordic countries, according to senior researcher Terje Emberland at the Center for Studies of Holocaust and Religious Minorities.

== Liberation and postwar heritage ==
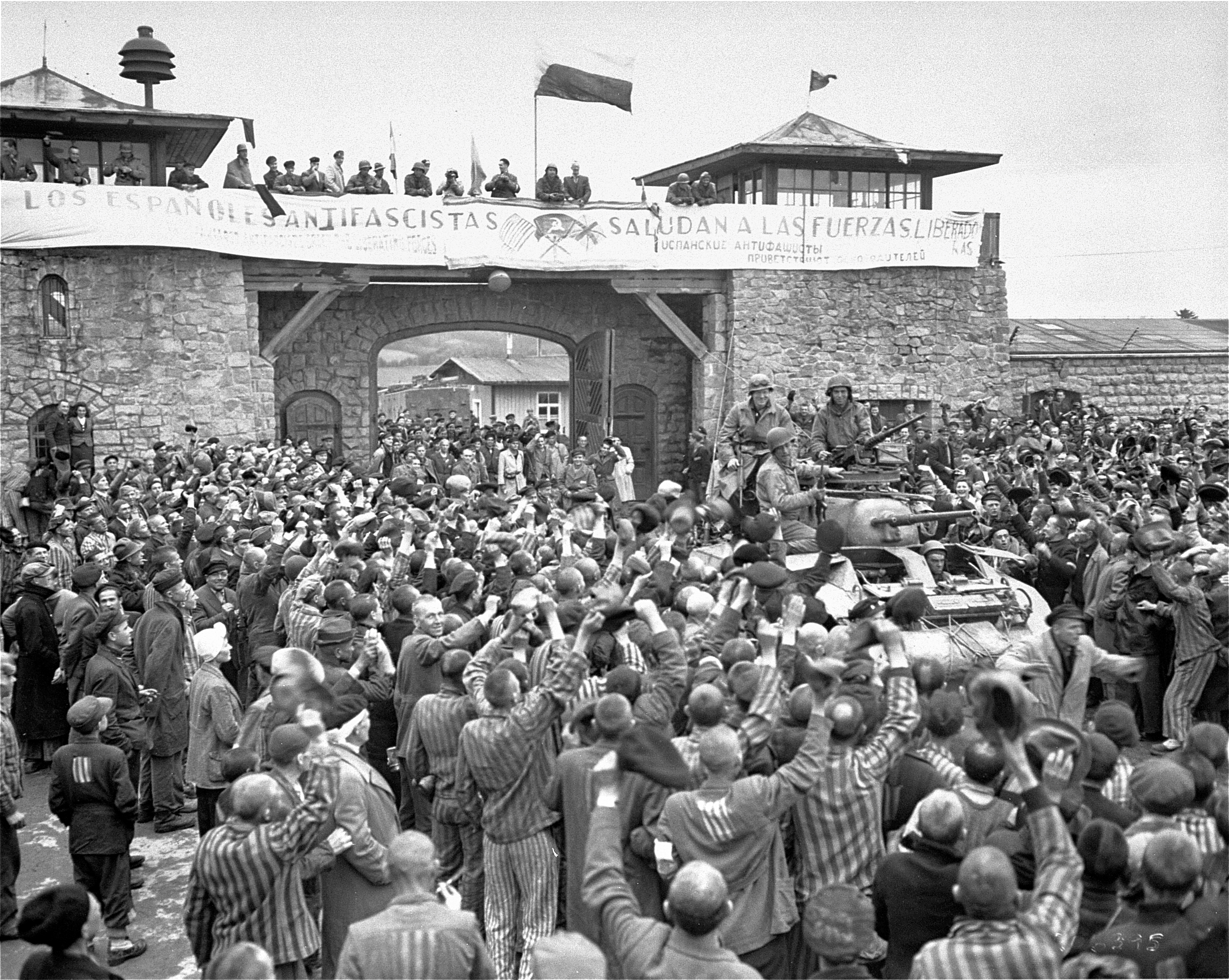
An M8 Greyhound armored car of the US Army's 11th Armored Division entering the Mauthausen concentration camp. The banner in the background (in Spanish) reads as "Anti-fascist Spaniards salute the forces of liberation".

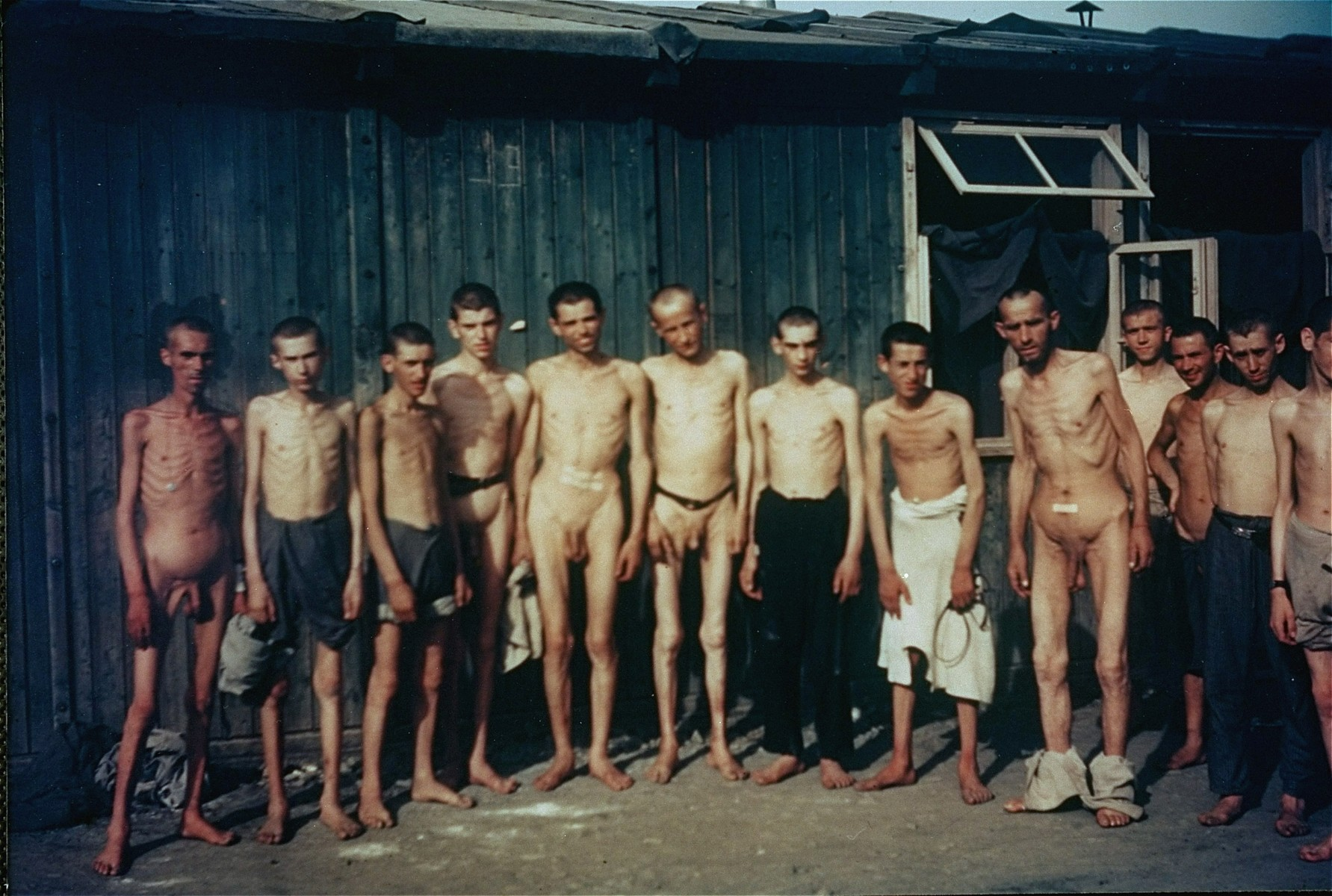
Naked survivors at Mauthausen

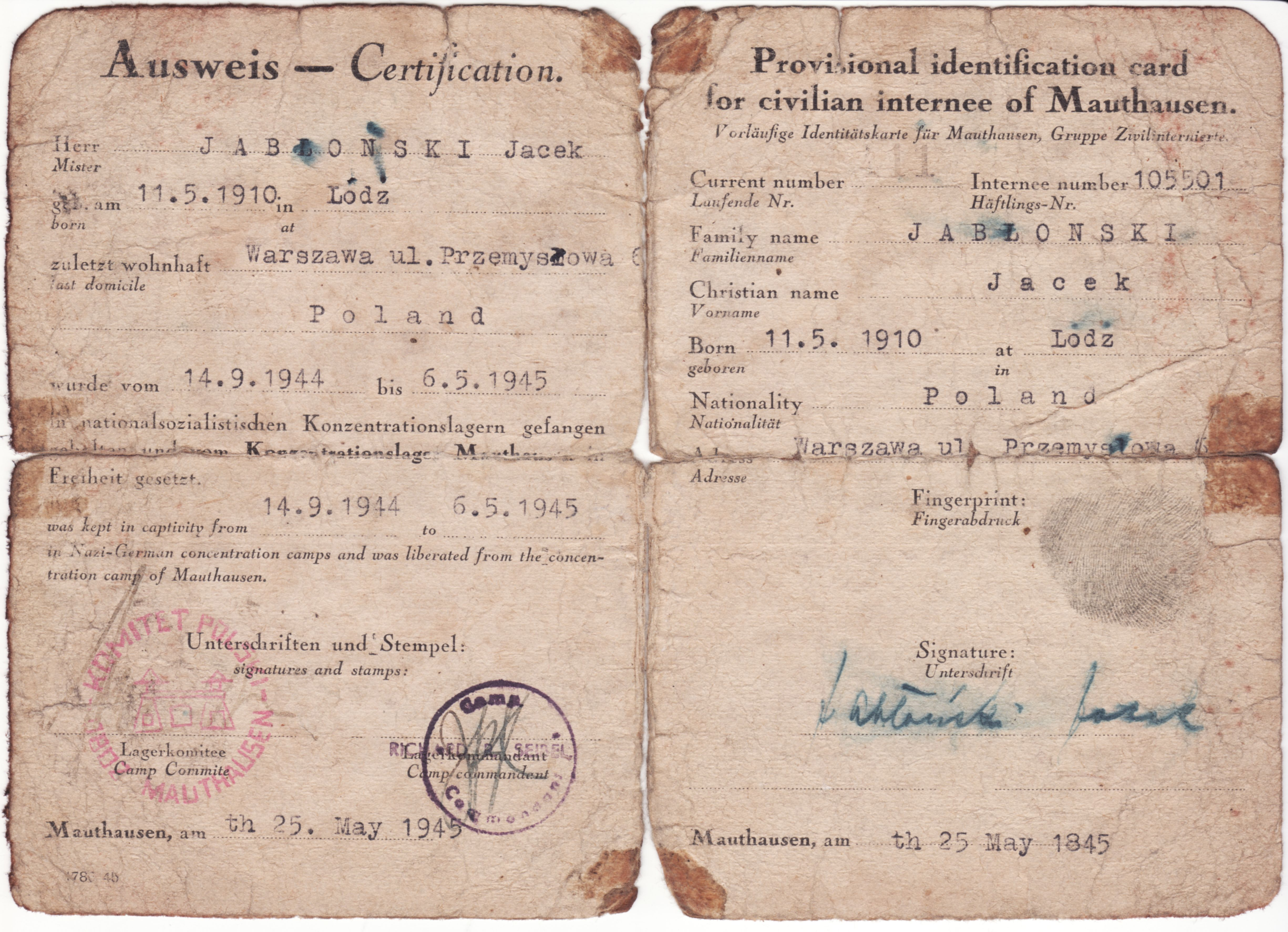
Temporary identity papers produced for Mauthausen detainee after camp liberation

During the final months before liberation, the camp's commander Franz Ziereis prepared for its defence against a possible Soviet offensive. The remaining prisoners were rushed to build a line of granite anti-tank obstacles to the east of Mauthausen. The inmates unable to cope with the hard labour and malnutrition were exterminated in large numbers to free space for newly arrived evacuation transports from other camps, including most of the subcamps of Mauthausen located in eastern Austria. In the final months of the war, the main source of dietary energy, the parcels of food sent through the International Red Cross, stopped and food rations became catastrophically low. The prisoners transferred to the "Hospital Subcamp" received one piece of bread per 20 inmates and roughly half a litre of weed soup a day. This made some of the prisoners, previously engaged in various types of resistance activity, begin to prepare plans to defend the camp in case of an SS attempt to exterminate all the remaining inmates.

On 3 May the SS and other guards started to prepare for evacuation of the camp. The following day, the guards of Mauthausen were replaced with unarmed Volkssturm soldiers and an improvised unit formed of elderly police officers and firefighters evacuated from Vienna. The police officer in charge of the unit accepted the "inmate self-government" as the camp's highest authority and Martin Gerken, until then the highest-ranking kapo prisoner in the Gusen's administration (in the rank of Lagerälteste, or the Camp's Elder), became the new de facto commander. He attempted to create an International Prisoner Committee that would become a provisional governing body of the camp until it was liberated by one of the approaching armies, but he was openly accused of co-operation with the SS and the plan failed.

All work in the subcamps of Mauthausen stopped and the inmates focused on preparations for their liberation – or defence of the camps against a possible assault by the SS divisions concentrated in the area. The remnants of several German divisions indeed assaulted the Mauthausen subcamp, but were repelled by the prisoners who took over the camp. Of the main subcamps of Mauthausen, only Gusen III was to be evacuated. On 1 May the inmates were rushed on a death march towards Sankt Georgen, but were ordered to return to the camp after several hours. The operation was repeated the following day, but called off soon afterwards. The following day, the SS guards deserted the camp, leaving the prisoners to their fate.

On 5 May 1945 the camp at Mauthausen was approached by a squad of US Army soldiers of the 41st Reconnaissance Squadron of the 11th Armored Division, Third United States Army. The reconnaissance squad was led by Staff Sergeant Albert J. Kosiek. His troop disarmed the policemen and left the camp. By the time of its liberation, most of the guards in Mauthausen had fled; around 30 of those who remained were killed by the prisoners. A number of SS men had their heads impaled with stakes, while others were beheaded with their own knives. A similar number were killed in Gusen II. By 6 May all the remaining subcamps of Mauthausen, with the exception of the two camps in the Loibl Pass, were also liberated by American forces.

Among the inmates liberated from the camp was Lieutenant Jack Taylor, an officer of the Office of Strategic Services. He had managed to survive with the help of several prisoners and was later a key witness at the Mauthausen-Gusen camp trials carried out by the Dachau International Military Tribunal. Another of the camp's survivors was Simon Wiesenthal, an engineer who spent the rest of his life hunting Nazi war criminals. Future Medal of Honor recipient Tibor "Ted" Rubin was imprisoned there as a young teenager; a Hungarian Jew, he vowed to join the US Army upon his liberation and later did just that, distinguishing himself in the Korean War as a corporal in the 8th Cavalry Regiment, 1st Cavalry Division.

Francesc Boix, a photographer and veteran of the Spanish Civil War, was imprisoned at the camp for four years. During his time working in the photography lab of the camp, he smuggled 3,000 negatives out of the camp and later used this photographic evidence to testify at the Nuremberg trials.

Following the capitulation of Germany, Mauthausen fell within the Soviet sector of occupation of Austria. Initially, the Soviet authorities used parts of the Mauthausen and Gusen I camps as barracks for the Red Army. At the same time, the underground factories were being dismantled and sent to the USSR as a war reparations. After that, between 1946 and 1947, the camps were unguarded and many furnishings and facilities of the camp were dismantled, both by the Red Army and by the local population. In the early summer of 1947, the Soviet forces had blown up the tunnels and were then withdrawn from the area, while the camp was turned over to Austrian civilian authorities.

== Memorials ==
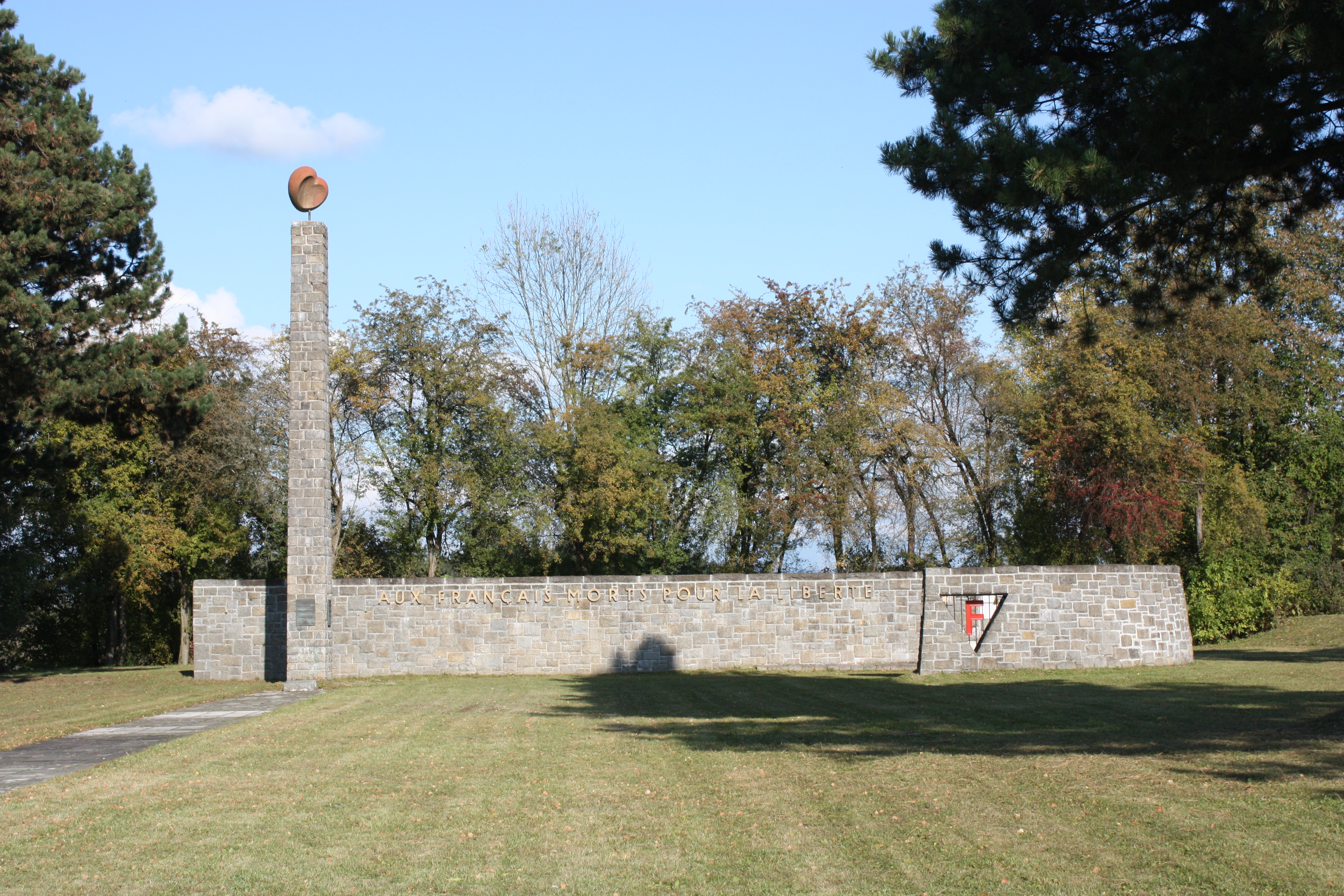
French monument at Mauthausen

Mauthausen was declared a national memorial site in 1949. Bruno Kreisky, the Chancellor of Austria, officially opened the Mauthausen Museum on 3 May 1975, 30 years after the camp's liberation. A visitor centre was inaugurated in 2003, designed by the architects Herwig Mayer, Christoph Schwarz, and Karl Peyrer-Heimstätt, covering an area of 2,845 square metres (30,620 sq ft).

The Mauthausen site remains largely intact, but much of what constituted the subcamps of Gusen I, II, and III is now covered by residential areas built after the war.

A memorial to Mauthausen stands amongst the various memorials to concentration camps in Père Lachaise Cemetery in Paris.

The "Mauthausen Trilogy", also known as "The Ballad of Mauthausen", is a cycle of four arias with lyrics based on poems written by Greek playwright Iakovos Kambanellis, a Mauthausen concentration camp survivor, and music written by Greek composer Mikis Theodorakis.

== Documentaries, films and music ==
- Mauthausen Trilogy (1965). Cycle of four arias with lyrics based on poems written by Greek poet Iakovos Kambanellis, a Mauthausen concentration camp survivor, and music written by Greek composer Mikis Theodorakis.
- The Quality of Mercy (1994). Austrian film written, directed and produced by Andreas Gruber.
- Joe Zawinul, Mauthausen - Vom großen Sterben hören (2000). Memorial music.
- Mauthausen–Gusen: La memòria] (2008) (in Valencian / catalan) by Rosa Brines and Daniel Rodríguez. An 18-minute documentary about the republican Spaniards deported to Mauthausen and Gusen. It includes testimonies from survivors.
- The Photographer of Mauthausen (2018). Based on real events, Francesc Boix is the Catalan photographer and inmate of Mauthausen who saved thousands of pieces of photographic evidence of the horrors committed inside the Austrian concentration camp's walls.
- Resistance at Mauthausen (2021). A 51-minute documentary by Barbara Necek about the resistance by republican Spanish prisoners, focusing particularly on Francisco Boix who preserved thousands of photographs of conditions inside the camp.

== See also ==
- Aktion Kugel
- Amicale de Mauthausen
- Camp de concentration d'Argelès-sur-Mer
- Eisenwerke Oberdonau
- Auschwitz concentration camp
- Flugmotorenwerke Ostmark
- Granitwerke Mauthausen
- Mauthausen Trilogy
- Mühlviertler Hasenjagd
- Steyr-Münichholz subcamp
- Ljubelj subcamp
- List of Nazi concentration camps
