= Cradley Heath F.C. =

English football club

Cradley Heath F.C. was an English association football club based in Cradley Heath in the Black Country. Between 1922 and 1961, the club competed in the Birmingham & District League, one of the country's strongest semi-professional leagues, and won the league championship in the 1925–26, 1930–31 and 1931–32 seasons. The club also competed in the FA Cup on a regular basis.

A new Cradley Heath F.C. competed briefly in the Midland Football Combination in the 1990s but it had no connection to the original Cradley Heath club.

== Notable players ==
- Future England international Jack Rowley played with the club between September and November 1936 on loan from Wolverhampton Wanderers.
- Joe Scott both began and ended his playing career with the club; he also appeared (between 1923 and 1930) in the Football League with Rotherham County, Barnsley and Tottenham Hotspur.
- Future England international Billy Wright was a player and groundsman for the team during March–April 1938 prior to joining Wolverhampton Wanderers.
