= Alexander Cochran =

Alexander Cochran may refer to:

- Alexander Gilmore Cochran (1846–1928), U.S. Representative from Pennsylvania
- Alexander Smith Cochran (1874–1929), businessman and philanthropist

== See also ==
- Alexander Cochrane (disambiguation)
