= Eddie Plane =

English footballer (1907–1969)

Edward Plane (27 September 1907 – 1969) was an English footballer who played as a goalkeeper for Rochdale. He also played non-league football for various other clubs.
