= Eric Holroyd (footballer) =

English footballer (1905–1987)

Eric Holroyd (24 July 1905 – 1987) was an English footballer who played as a winger for Rochdale. He also played non-league football for various other clubs.
