= Jack Flanagan (footballer) =

English footballer (1902–1989)

Personal information
- Full name: John Flanagan
- Date of birth: 3 February 1902
- Place of birth: Lostock Hall, England
- Date of death: 4 May 1989 (aged 87)
- Position: Centre forward

Senior career*
Years	Team	Apps	(Gls)
1924–1925	Manchester United	0	(0)
1925–1926	Chorley		
1926–1929	Tranmere Rovers	64	(42)
1929–1930	Chorley		
1930	Barrow	5	(0)
1930–1931	Wigan Borough	1	(0)
1931–1932	Lancaster Town		
1932	Burscough		
1932	Lancaster Town		
1932–1933	Stalybridge Celtic		
1933–1934	Rhyl		
- Northwich Victoria
- Leyland Motors
- * Club domestic league appearances and goals

Jack Flanagan (3 February 1902 – 4 May 1989) was an English footballer who played as a centre forward for Manchester United, Tranmere Rovers, Chorley, Barrow, Wigan Borough, Burscough, Lancaster, Rhyl and Leyland Motors.
