= William Hamilton (footballer) =

Scottish footballer

Personal information
- Date of birth: 24 October 1904
- Place of birth: Musselburgh, Scotland
- Date of death: 19 July 1984 (aged 79)
- Place of death: Springboig, Scotland
- Position: Forward

Senior career*
Years	Team	Apps	(Gls)
- Tollcross YMCA
- Vale of Clyde
- Shettleston
- Bellshill Athletic
1925–1927	Bradford City	13	(3)
1927–1928	Southport	31	(8)
1928–1929	Barrow		
1929–1930	Accrington Stanley		
- Notts County
- Alloa Athletic
Total		44+	(11+)
- * Club domestic league appearances and goals

William Hamilton (24 October 1904 – 19 July 1984) was a Scottish professional footballer who played as a forward.

== Career ==
Born in Musselburgh, Hamilton moved to Glasgow aged 12.

He played for Tollcross YMCA, Vale of Clyde, Shettleston, Bellshill Athletic, Bradford City, Southport, Barrow, Accrington Stanley, Notts County and Alloa Athletic.

For Bradford City he made 13 appearances in the Football League.

After retiring as a player, he worked as an electrician and also served in various roles with former club Shettleston. He had his leg amputated and died within a year.

== Sources ==
- Frost, Terry (1988). Bradford City A Complete Record 1903-1988. Breedon Books Sport. ISBN 0-907969-38-0.
