= Jack Barber =

English footballer (1901–1961)

Personal information
- Full name: John Barber
- Date of birth: 8 January 1901
- Place of birth: Salford
- Date of death: 30 March 1961 (aged 60)
- Height: 1.78 m (5 ft 10 in)
- Position: Centre-back

Senior career*
Years	Team	Apps	(Gls)
1919	South Salford Lads Club		
1921	Clayton		
1923	Manchester United	3	(1)
1923	→ Mossley (loan)		
1924-1926	Southport	43	(19)
1926-1927	Halifax Town	12	(1)
1927-1931	Rochdale	142	(4)
1931-1932	Stockport County	16	(0)
1932-1933	Hull City	0	(0)
1933	Stockport County	0	(0)
1933	Bacup Borough		
Total		216	(25)
- * Club domestic league appearances and goals

John Barber (8 January 1901 – 30 March 1961) was an English footballer who played as a central defender for Clayton, Southport, Manchester United, Rochdale, Stockport County and Bacup Borough.
