= William Wood (footballer, born 1904) =

English footballer

William Cecil Wood (1904–1961) was an English footballer who played as a goalkeeper for Rochdale. He was also on the reserve teams for Manchester City and Newcastle United.
