= Billy Robinson (footballer, born 1898) =

English footballer

Personal information
- Full name: William Atkin Robinson
- Date of birth: 30 December 1898
- Place of birth: Pegswood, England
- Date of death: 1975 (aged 76–77)
- Position: Centre forward

Senior career*
Years	Team	Apps	(Gls)
1923–1924	Pegswood Colliery		
1924–1928	Hartlepools United	62	(38)
1928–1929	Bradford (Park Avenue)	5	(1)
1929–1930	Lincoln City	17	(7)
1930–1932	Gainsborough Trinity		
1932–1933	Ashington		
1933	Crook Town		
Total		84	(46)
- * Club domestic league appearances and goals

William Atkin Robinson (30 December 1898 – 1975) was an English footballer who played in the Football League for Bradford (Park Avenue), Hartlepools United and Lincoln City.
