= Walter Webster (footballer, born 1906) =

English footballer

Walter Webster (3 June 1906 – 17 November 1942) was an English footballer who played as a central defender for Rochdale and Barrow. He also played non-league football for various other clubs. Webster died on 17 November 1942 in Tunisia while serving with The Parachute Regiment, A.A.C.
