= John Stephenson (footballer, born 1896) =

English footballer

Personal information
- Date of birth: 31 January 1896
- Place of birth: Croxdale, Durham, England, United Kingdom
- Date of death: 1971 (aged 74)
- Height: 1.67 m (5 ft 6 in)
- Position: Right-back

Youth career
- ?: Horden Athletic

Senior career*
Years	Team	Apps	(Gls)
1921-1923	Luton Town	10	(0)
1924-?	Ashington	130	
- Rochdale
?-1929	Ashington		
- * Club domestic league appearances and goals

John Stephenson (31 January 1896 – 1976) was an English footballer who played as a full back for Luton Town, Durham City, Rochdale, and Ashington.

Stephenson played in 204 professional matches throughout his career, scoring one goal from a penalty for Ashington against Tranmere Rovers.
