= Joe Scott (footballer, born 1900) =

English footballer

Personal information
- Full name: Joseph Scott
- Date of birth: 6 July 1900
- Place of birth: Lye, Worcestershire, England
- Date of death: 1962 (aged 61–62)
- Height: 5 ft 7 in (1.70 m)
- Position: Outside left

Senior career*
Years	Team	Apps	(Gls)
–	Cradley Heath		
1923–1927	Rotherham County	167	(54)
1927	Barnsley	10	(3)
1928–1930	Tottenham Hotspur	18	(4)
–	Cradley Heath		
- * Club domestic league appearances and goals

Joseph Scott (6 July 1900 – 1962) was an English professional footballer who played for Cradley Heath, Rotherham County, Barnsley and Tottenham Hotspur.

Scott began his career at Cradley Heath. The outside left joined Rotherham County and featured in 167 matches scoring 54 goals between 1923 and 1927. In 1927 he signed for Barnsley and scored three goals in 10 appearances.

Scott joined Tottenham Hotspur in 1928. He scored on his 'Lilywhites' debut in a 3–2 victory over Wolves at White Hart Lane in September 1928 in the old Second Division. Joe went on to play in a further 18 matches and found the net on four occasions.

He returned to Cradley Heath where he ended his footballing career.
