= Alf Quantrill =

English footballer (1897–1968)

Personal information
- Full name: Alfred Edward Quantrill
- Date of birth: 22 January 1897
- Place of birth: Rawalpindi, British India
- Date of death: 19 April 1968 (aged 71)
- Place of death: Trefriw, Wales
- Height: 5 ft 10 in (1.78 m)
- Position: Outside forward

Senior career*
Years	Team	Apps	(Gls)
- Boston Swifts
1914–1921	Derby County	72	(5)
1921–1924	Preston North End	64	(7)
1924	→ Chorley (loan)		
1924–1930	Bradford Park Avenue	191	(58)
1930–1932	Nottingham Forest	15	(2)

International career
1920–1921	England	4	(1)
- * Club domestic league appearances and goals

Alfred Edward Quantrill (22 January 1897 – 19 April 1968) was an English footballer. Born in Rawalpindi, Punjab, British India where his father was based on military service, he played on either wing and appeared four times for the England national team.

Quantrill played non-league football for Boston Swifts until being signed by Derby County in 1914. Quantrill helped Derby gain promotion to Division One in his first season at the club, but his career was soon interrupted by the First World War. He served as a member of the Derbyshire Yeomanry, but was sent home after developing malaria in Salonika.

Quantrill returned to health and retained his place in the Derby team when league football resumed. In March 1920 he made his debut for England against Wales, a 2–1 defeat. He went on to win four caps, scoring once, in the 5–4 win at home to Scotland.

In 1921 Quantrill was transferred to Preston North End, playing in a forward line also including Tommy Roberts, Rowland Woodhouse and Archie Rawlings. He made his debut on 27 August 1921 in a 2–2 draw away to Bolton Wanderers. Quantrill played in 64 games for Preston before leaving in 1923 to join Bradford Park Avenue. He later moved to Nottingham Forest in August 1930 where he finished his league career in April 1932.

== Personal life ==
Quantrill was married to Hetty Winifred Bloomer, the eldest daughter of former England international Steve Bloomer and had two children. He served as a private in the Derbyshire Yeomanry during the First World War.

== See also ==
- List of England international footballers born outside England
