= LouAnn Gerken =

American linguist (born 1959)

- Born: May 20, 1959
- Died: May 17, 2025 (aged 65)
- Education: University of Rochester (B.A.); Columbia University (M.A., Ph.D.)
- Scientific career
- Fields: Psychology, Linguistics, Cognitive science
- Workplaces: University of Arizona

LouAnn Gerken (born May 20, 1959) was a Professor Emerita of Psychology, Linguistics, and Cognitive Science at the University of Arizona.

== Career and education ==
She was the author of a book on language development and had over 80 published articles and book chapters on the topic. Her education included a B.A. in Psychology (University of Rochester, 1981), an M.A. in Experimental Psychology (Columbia University, 1983), and a Ph.D. in Experimental Psychology (Columbia University, 1987). She had conducted research aiming to compare language development between infants and adults as well as comparing language and music development.

== Book ==
- Language Development
