= Allan Murray (footballer, born 1907) =

English footballer

Allan Ferguson Murray (31 May 1907 – 1995) was an English footballer who played as a central defender for Rochdale, Fulham and Bristol Rovers. He also played non-league football for various other clubs. He was 5 ft 11 in (1.80 m) tall.
