= Uriah Miles =

English footballer (1907–1970)

Uriah Miles (4 Jan 1907 – 1970) was an English footballer who played as a winger for Wrexham and Rochdale. He also played non-league football for various other clubs.
