= Martin Gerken =

Martin Gerken was a German communist and one of the highest-ranking Kapos in the Mauthausen-Gusen concentration camp. Between April 1, 1945 and the liberation on May 5 of the same year he served as the camp's elder (German: Lagerältester) of the sub-camp of Gusen.
