= Fred Urmson =

English footballer (1907–1985)

Personal information
- Date of birth: 26 November 1907
- Place of birth: Little Hulton, England
- Date of death: 11 September 1985 (aged 77)
- Place of death: Blackpool, England
- Height: 5 ft 7 1/2 in (1.71 m)
- Position: Outside left

Senior career*
Years	Team	Apps	(Gls)
–1927	Atherton		
1927–1936	Tranmere Rovers	310	(04)
1936–	Exeter City		
- * Club domestic league appearances and goals

Fred Urmson (26 November 1907 – 11 September 1985) was an English footballer who played as an outside left for Atherton, Tranmere Rovers and Exeter City. He made 333 appearances for Tranmere, scoring 107 goals.

He also played for Stalybridge Celtic and South Liverpool and Mossley, where he scored eight goals in 28 appearances in the 1939–40 season.
