= George Johnson (footballer, born 1904) =

English footballer

Personal information
- Full name: George Alfred Johnson
- Date of birth: 20 July 1904
- Place of birth: Ashington, England
- Date of death: 1979 (aged 83–84)
- Height: 5 ft 9 in (1.75 m)
- Position: Wing-half

Senior career*
Years	Team	Apps	(Gls)
1922–1923	Ashington Welfare		
1923–1924	Bedlington United		
1924–1929	Ashington	167	(67)
1930–1931	Sheffield Wednesday	1	(1)
1932–1937	Reading	161	(8)
1937–1938	Watford	23	(8)
Total		352	(84)
- * Club domestic league appearances and goals

George Alfred Johnson (20 July 1904 – 1985) was an English footballer who played in the Football League for Ashington, Reading, Sheffield Wednesday and Watford.
