= Jackie Mittell =

Welsh footballer

Personal information
- Full name: James Lyons Mittell
- Date of birth: 28 February 1906
- Place of birth: Merthyr Tydfil, Wales
- Date of death: 30 March 1976 (aged 70)
- Place of death: Merthyr Tydfil, Wales
- Height: 5 ft 11 in (1.80 m)
- Position: Goalkeeper

Senior career*
Years	Team	Apps	(Gls)
- Merthyr Town
- Penrhiwceiber
1926–1929	Rochdale	46	(0)
1929–1930	Wigan Borough	40	(0)
1930	Connah's Quay		
1930–1931	Wigan Borough (Note: These figures include 12 games from the 1931–32 Football League season with Wigan Borough. The club folded following the match on 24 October 1931, a 5–0 defeat at Wrexham in which Mittell played. Although the team's results from that season were expunged, Joyce includes the players' appearances in his totals.)	30	(0)
1931–1933	Birmingham	6	(0)
1933–193?	Luton Town	8	(0)
193?–193?	Derry City		
1935–1937	Hartlepools United	65	(0)
1937–1938	Barrow	42	(0)
1938–1939	Tunbridge Wells Rangers		
- * Club domestic league appearances and goals

James Lyons Mittell (28 February 1906 – 30 March 1976), known as Jackie Mittell, was a Welsh professional footballer who made 247 appearances in the Football League playing for Rochdale, Wigan Borough, Birmingham, Luton Town, Hartlepools United and Barrow. He played as a goalkeeper.

Mittell was born in Merthyr Tydfil, Wales, and began his football career in his native country with Merthyr Town and Penrhiwceiber, before crossing the border to England to join Rochdale of the Third Division North in 1926. He played 46 League games for Rochdale before joining Wigan Borough in 1929. Mittell played 40 league games for Wigan Borough before joining Connah's Quay, but was back at Wigan for what turned out to be the club's last season. The season opened with a 4–0 defeat in Chester's first game since their election to the Football League. The final first-team game before the club folded and their results were expunged was a 5–0 defeat at Wrexham on 24 October 1931. Mittell had been ever-present for those 12 games.

He joined First Division club Birmingham as backup to England's first-choice goalkeeper Harry Hibbs. He played only six times in 18 months, and moved on to Luton Town and Derry City before finding a regular place in the starting eleven at Hartlepools United. After 78 games in all competitions for Hartlepools, Mittell joined his last Football League club, Barrow, where he spent one season before moving into non-League football with Tunbridge Wells Rangers.

Mittell died on 30 March 1976 aged 70.
