= Sandy Cochrane =

Scottish footballer (1900–1967)

Personal information
- Full name: Alexander Fraser Cochrane
- Date of birth: 8 August 1900
- Place of birth: Glasgow, Scotland
- Date of death: 2 September 1967 (aged 67)
- Place of death: Kettering, England
- Height: 5 ft 5 1/2 in (1.66 m)
- Positions: Inside forward; outside right

Senior career*
Years	Team	Apps	(Gls)
19??–1922	Shawfield Juniors		
1922–1923	Alloa Athletic		
1923–1926	Middlesbrough	67	(8)
1926–1929	Darlington	100	(24)
1929–1931	Bradford City	69	(27)
1931–1932	Chesterfield	27	(1)
1932–1934	Llanelly		
1934–1935	Northampton Town	42	(7)
1935–1936	Swindon Town	13	(1)
1936–1937	East Stirlingshire		
1937–1938	Dumbarton	15	(1)
- * Club domestic league appearances and goals

Alexander Fraser Cochrane (8 August 1900 – 2 September 1967), known as Sandy or Alex Cochrane, was a Scottish footballer who scored 68 goals from 318 appearances in the Football League while playing for Middlesbrough, Darlington, Bradford City, Chesterfield, Northampton Town and Swindon Town. He began his career with Shawfield Juniors, played in the Scottish League for Alloa Athletic, East Stirlingshire and Dumbarton, and spent time with Welsh club Llanelly.

== Life and career ==
Cochrane was born on 8 August 1900 in Glasgow, where he began his football career with Shawfield Juniors. He joined Alloa Athletic in January 1922, helped them win the Division Two title and with it automatic promotion to Division One, and established a reputation as a goalscorer. Cochrane moved to England to sign for First Division club Middlesbrough for what was reported as a four-figure fee, scoring on his debut against Arsenal on 3 March 1923 to help his team to their first win of the year. Middlesbrough were relegated to the Second Division at the end of the following season, and in April 1926 became one of several former first-team regulars to be transfer-listed.

He signed for Darlington for the new season, and over the next two and a half years (the first in the Second Division, the remainder in the Third), he scored 24 goals from 100 League appearances. In January 1929, he returned to the second tier with Bradford City for an undisclosed fee. At Bradford he played 69 league games scoring 27 goals, as well as netting four goals from five FA Cup games. He was the club's top scorer with 21 goals in 1929–30 as they avoided relegation from the Second Division by just one point.

Cochrane spent the 1931–32 season with Chesterfield before joining Llanelly, a Welsh club playing in both the Southern League and the Welsh League, in September 1932. The Taunton Courier was effusive about his debut: "The new player was a great success, showing splendid ball control and a capacity for carrying on flanking movements which has never been surpassed by any Llanelly player. On Saturday's form he is a wonderful capture, and he had the distinction of scoring a brace of goals in a manner which marked him as a fine opportunist." He went on to captain the side, and scored the winner as they beat Cheltenham Town in the third qualifying round of the 1933–34 FA Cup, only to be eliminated because his team contained ineligible players. In January 1934, Cochrane resumed his Football League with Northampton Town.

After 18 months with Northampton and a season with Swindon Town, Cochrane returned to Scotland where he signed for Second Division club East Stirlingshire. He was retained for the 1937–38 season, but by November, the club was in deep financial trouble. Cochrane was one of several players released after refusing the club's proposal that they accept a proportion of the gate money in lieu of salary. Within days, he joined divisional rivals Dumbarton, where he finished the season.

Cochrane died on 2 September 1967 in Kettering, in Northamptonshire, England, at the age of 67.
