= SS Howard S. Gerken =

Seel-hulled American dredge sunk in Lake Erie

Coordinates: 42°16′24.89″N 80°3′21.6″W

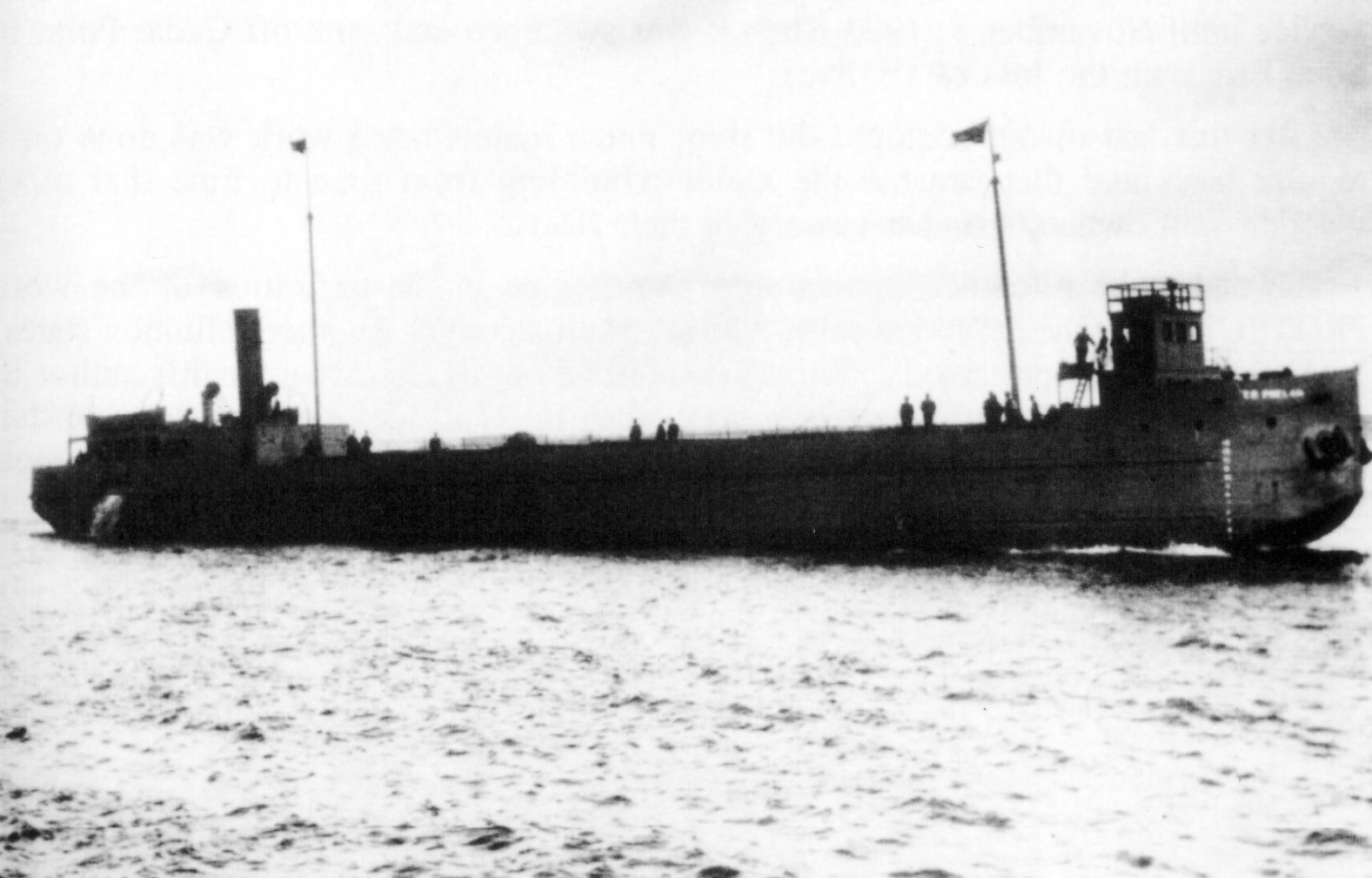

History

United States
- Name: Rosamond Billett (1910–1919); T.P. Phelan (1919–1925); Howard S. Gerken (1925–1926)
- Owner: Gravel Products Corporation
- Port of registry: Hamilton, Ontario
- Ordered: 1910
- Builder: Doty Engine Works of Toronto, Ontario
- Launched: October 10, 1910
- In service: 1910
- Out of service: August 21, 1926
- Identification: US official number 225429
- Fate: Sank in a storm on Lake Erie

General characteristics
- Type: Dredge
- Tonnage: 679.46 GRT (1910–1920); 1,322 GRT (1920–1926); 462.04 NRT (1910–1920); 803 NRT (1920–1926)
- Length: 155 feet (47.2 m) (1888–1905); 178.4 feet (54.4 m) (1905–1928)
- Beam: 24.1 feet (7.3 m)
- Depth: 16.3 feet (5.0 m)
- Installed power: Engines: 2 × 366 hp (273 kW) condensing compound steam engines; Boilers: 1 × 150 pounds per square inch (1,000 kPa) Scotch marine boiler
- Propulsion: 2 × fixed pitch propellers

SS Howard S. Gerken (also known as Rosamond Billett and T.P. Phelan) was a steel-hulled American dredge in service between 1910 and 1926. She was assembled in Winnipeg, Manitoba, in 1910, by components manufactured by the Doty Engine Works of Toronto, Ontario. She was built for the Canadian Northern Railway, and served as a sand dredge on Lake Winnipeg, and the nearby Red River. She was rebuilt in 1920, and was sold several times, before ending up under the ownership of the Gravel Products Corporation, of Buffalo, New York.

On August 21, 1926, after removing sand from the harbour entrance in Erie, Pennsylvania, Howard S. Gerken set sail for Buffalo. While seven miles off Erie, she became caught in a storm, and foundered, with the loss of four crewmen. The wreck was found by sonar in 2009.
