= John Gurkin =

English footballer

Personal information
- Full name: John Gurkin
- Date of birth: 9 September 1895
- Place of birth: Murton, County Durham, England
- Date of death: 25 February 1976 (aged 80)
- Place of death: Sunderland, England
- Height: 5 ft 10 1/2 in (1.79 m)
- Positions: Centre half; left half

Senior career*
Years	Team	Apps	(Gls)
- Dean Park
- South Hetton Rovers
1921–1922	West Ham United	1	(0)
1922–1923	Norwich City	10	(0)
1923	Stalybridge Celtic		
1923–1924	Spennymoor United		
1924–1928	Durham City	160	(3)
1928–1929	Stalybridge Celtic		
1929–1930	Exeter City	2	(0)
1930–1932	Hyde United		
1932	Jarrow		
1932–193?	Murton Colliery Welfare		
- * Club domestic league appearances and goals

John Gurkin (born 9 September 1895 – 25 February 1976) was an English footballer who played as a centre half or left half in the Football League for West Ham United, Norwich City, Durham City and Exeter City.

== Club career ==
Signed by West Ham from South Hetton Rovers, Gurkin played only once, on 27 August 1921 in a 2–0 home defeat by Stoke. Moving to Norwich City in 1922 he remained for only one season before moving into non-league football with Stalybridge Celtic and Spennymoor United. He returned to the Football League with Durham City, making 160 appearances over four seasons in the Third Division North. After a season with Stalybridge Celtic, Gurkin finished his league career with two appearances for Exeter City, after which he returned to non-league with Hyde United, Jarrow and Murton Colliery Welfare.
