= Albert Monks (footballer, born 1903) =

English footballer

Albert Monks (1903–1937) was an English footballer who played as a goalkeeper for Rochdale. He also played non-league football for various other clubs.
