= Gerkens =

Gerkens is a surname. Notable people with the surname include:

- Jacob F. Gerkens (1842–1906), German-born American police chief
- Pieter Gerkens (born 1995), Belgian footballer
- Muriel Gerkens (born 1957), Belgian politician

== See also ==
- Gerken, a surname
