= County of Schaunberg =

County in what is now Upper Austria

County of Schaunberg Grafschaft Schaunberg
- Mid 12th century–1572
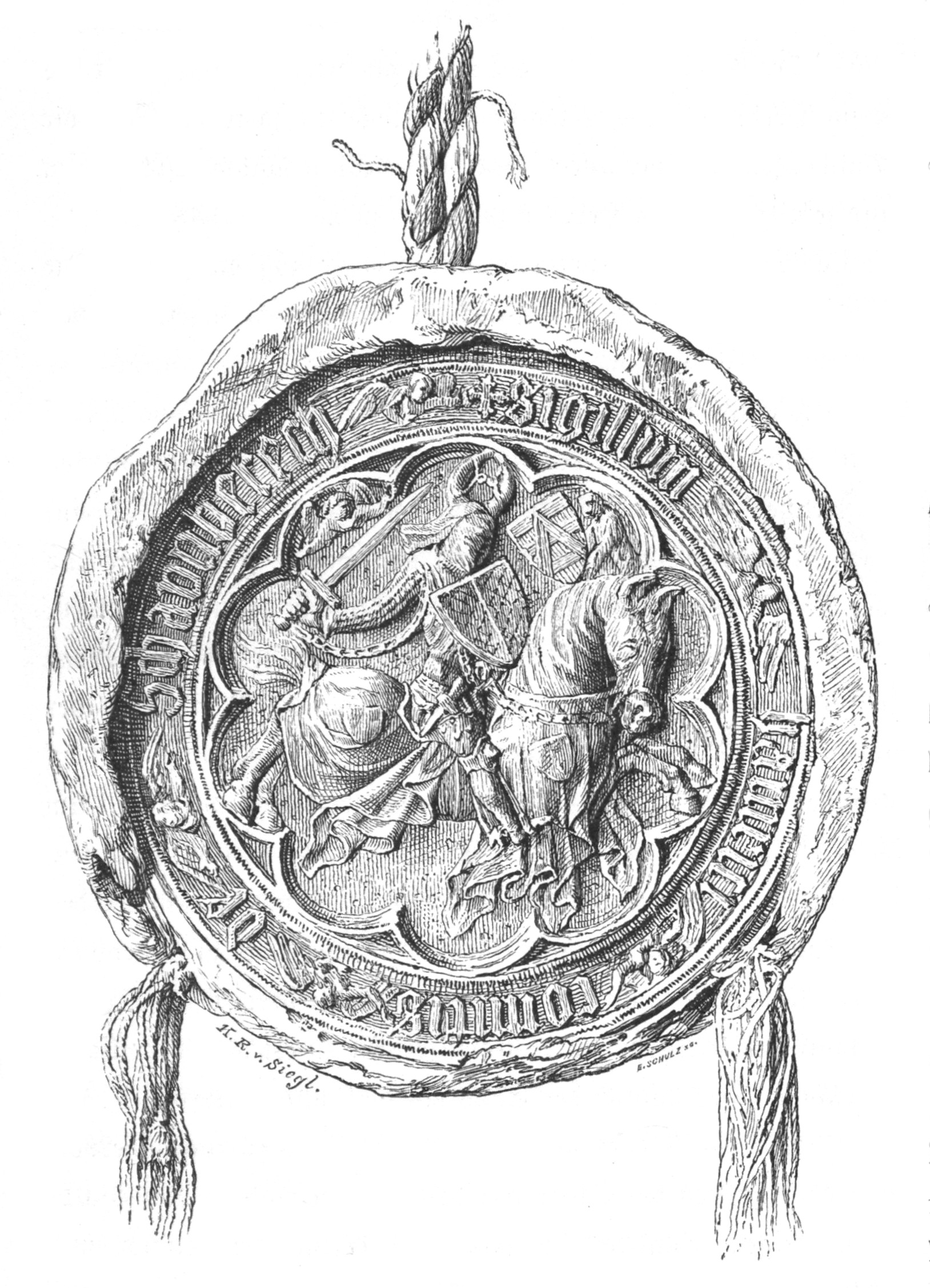
- Seal of Heinrich von Schaunberg - 1375

- A map of the County of Schaunberg (red) at the time of the Hohenstaufen Emperors (circa 1250). The pale highlighted area roughly corresponds with the later Austrian Circle, which is anachronistic and shown only to provide context.
- Status: State of the Holy Roman Empire
- Capital: Castle Schaunberg, Hartkirchen
- Government: Grafschaft (county)
- Count
- History
  - Aschach an der Donau granted as imperial fief: Mid 12th century
  - First recorded mention of the Schaunbergers as counts: 1316
  - Fealty sworn to Austria: 2 February 1383
  - Voting rights in the Imperial Diet revoked: 1548
  - Male Schaunberger line extinct: 1559
  - Disestablished: 10 August 1572
Succeeded by
Archduchy of Austria / Arms of the Archduchy of Austria
- Today part of: Austria

The County of Schaunberg (German: Grafschaft Schaunberg; also Schaumberg) was a state of the Holy Roman Empire, located in present-day Upper Austria. It roughly corresponded to the modern Hausruckviertel. Its seat was the castle of Schaunberg, Hartkirchen.

The Schaunbergers, who are descended from lords of Julbach (am Inn), were granted the lucrative imperial fief of Aschach an der Donau by Kaiser Friedrich Barbarossa in the middle of the 12th century. A few years later (documentary evidence suggests 1160) Heinricus de Scovenberch erected a castle not far from Aschach, which became the eponymous centre of the territory. Over the course of the 13th century the Schaunbergers built up a Vogtei (bailiwick), particularly by means of high jurisdiction, (over the Cistercian Wilhering Abbey) and church patronage, mainly between Kürnberg, Sauwald, the Danube and Hausruck. Documents from 1316 already refer to the Schaunbergers as Grafen (counts), and speak of the territory as "terra nostra"; it was a Grafschaft (county) with a Landrecht and a special position in Upper Austria. The town Eferding, which the Schaunbergers bought from the Bishop of Passau in 1367, took a significant upturn under their rule.

1380 Duke Albert III of Austria decided to try to put an end to the Schaunbergers' independence. In the Schaunberger Feud (1380–1390) he occupied all of their castles on the Danube as well as the town of Eferding, though his siege Castle Schaunberg proved fruitless. Nevertheless, Heinrich von Schaunberg had to concede defeat and swear fealty to the Austrian Duke. This defeat was secured by series of agreements, including the arbitration of 2 February 1383 through a court of imperial princes. By 1388 however Count Heinrich once again felt strong enough to rebel against the Habsburgs; after varying success he finally submitted and had to finally swear fealty the Duke in 1390.

The Schaunbergers continued to claim a certain position for around a century. Among other things Friedrich V von Schaunberg was between 1489 and 1494 Prince-Archbishop of Salzburg. With the succession of the Austrian Habsburgs to the imperial throne (Friedrich III and then Maximilian I), the special rights of the Schaunergers were finally curtailed; in 1548 during the Reformation the Schaunbergers lost their voting rights in the Imperial Diet upon becoming Lutheran, and in 1559 the male line died out upon the death of Count Wolfgang von Schaunberg, after which the title was inherited by the Starhembergers through his sister Anna.

After the extinction of the male line of Schaunbergers, the fief was, through a compromise with Kaiser Maximilian II on 10 August 1572, mortgaged to the Starhembergs and the Liechtensteiners, requiring 45,000 florins for repayment, and ceding of the district court and Wildbannforst in the Danube Valley.

The term Landl, which was the name of the Hausruckviertel until the 18th century, originates in the County of Schaunberg.

== Counts of Schaunberg (after 1382) ==
The counts of Schaunberg trace their origins to Edlen von Julbach. They were also known by the name von Schaunburg from the time of Heinrich IV (Henricus comes de Scounberch; 1316) onwards. Due to the growth of the goods produced in what is today the Innviertel, the Julbach-Schaunbergs relocated their seat to Castle Schaunburg. In 1382 Count Heinrich von Schaunberg sold the lordship of Julbach, their former seat, to house Wittelsbach, after which they were exclusively known by the name von Schaunburg.

- Heinrich VII von Julbach-Schaunberg, 1355; † 9 October 1390;
  married Ursula von Görz of Schöneck, Neuhaus and Uttenstein, on 9 January 1362; † after 1383
  - Heinrich VIII (1380/82–1383)
    - several daughters
  - Ulrich II, 1382
    married Elisabeth von Abensberg, daughter of Johann von Abensberg before 18 March 1386; † 1423
    - Georg I, 1401/04
    - Johann I of Achau, Eferding, Erlach, Rabensberg, Lemberg, Mistelbach und Peuerbach, 1424 commander in Austria, 1438 Marshal of Steyr, king's advisor and Imperial High Master, † 16 November 1453;
      married Anna von Pettau around 1413; † 29 March 1465; interred in Franziskanerkloster Pupping
      - Ulrich, † 1 October ???
      - Johann II, 1421; † after 19 October 1437
      - Bernhard von Weitenegg, imperial advisor, 1447 commander in Austria; † 8 April 1473
        married Agnes von Wallsee (daughter of Reinprecht d. J. von Wallsee and Katharina von Rosenberg) before 10 August 1430; † 15 August 1479
        - Friedrich V, 13 June 1439; in Siena in 1449; 1469 Canon, 1484 priest of Salzburg, 1485 Provost of St. Andrä im Lavanttal, 1489 Bishop-elect, 1490 Archbishop of Salzburg; † 4 October 1494 in Salzburg of dropsy and interred in St Peter's Abbey
        - Siegmund III, † 1536
        - Ladislaus, † 16 July 1475
        - Georg II of Frankenburg, Kammer, Neuattersee, Seisenegg and Neumarkt, † 7 March 1491 in Schaunburg, interred in Wilhering;
          married Maria Margareta von Starhemberg before 12 November 1484 (born 1469, died 1522), daughter of Hans von Sprinzenstein and Elisabeth von Hohenberg
          - Elisabeth, 1491, † 30 August 1512;
            married Johann Prueschenk Count of Hardegg before 26 May 1503, † 27 July 1535 in Liegnitz
      - Albrecht, 1430; 1444 Canon of Passau; 1445/61 Provost of St. Stephan, Vienna, 1448 matriculated in Vienna; 1451 in Bologna; Doctor of law; † 15. August 1473 after falling from a horse
      - Wolfgang I; 1448 matriculated in Vienna, imperial commander, † 30 July 1484, interred in Pupping
      - Ludwig, † 9 August 1427
      - Ludwig, 1448 matriculated in Vienna, † 19 June 1453
      - Elisabeth, 1437, † August 1461
        married Ulrich, Count von Oettingen of Flochberg before 25 February 1444, † 28 May 1477
      - Barbara, † after 1492
        married Duyn Frangepan comes de Vegilia etc. before 24 June 1457; † after 14 June 1487
      - Agnes, † 1457, interred in Pupping;
        married Heinrich IV, Lord of Rosenberg before 24 September 1453, † in Vienna 25 March 1457
      - Siegmund I, imperial commander, 1489 head marshal in Austria; † 2 October 1498, interred in Pupping;
        married Barbara von Wallsee (daughter of Reinprecht V of ober- und Niederwallsee and Margareta von Starhemberg); † in Niederwallsee 15 November 1505
        - Friedrich, died young
        - Bernhard, died young
        - Wolfgang, died young
      - Ulrich III of Frauenheim, Klein-Sölk, Rabensberg and Lemberg, 1449 head marshal in Steier, 1460/1463 commander in Carniola, † 27 December 1484;
        1st wife: Barbara
        2nd wife: Margareta von Kraig, † 6 June 1492, daughter of Andreas and Katharina von Rohr (married second husband Wilhelm der Reiche von Auersperg of Krumau at the Großsen Kamp on 22 October 1488; † 1506)
        - Johann III, 1478, † 1490
        - Siegmund, died young
        - Werner, died young
        - Genoveva, 1486, † 1519;
          married Johann von Liechtenstein, Herr zu Niklasburg in 1498
        - Georg III of Mistelbach, Peuerbach, Erlach, Stauff, Aschach, Neumarkt etc., 1472; high marshal in Austria and Steir, 1544 Augsburg Confession, † after 10 April 1554 in Eferding;
          married Genoveva Countess of Arco, daughter of Count Andreas I of Arco and Barbara di Martinengo, † died 1554
          - Johann IV, Augsburg Confession, † in Linz 31 May 1551;
            married Begina von Polheim in Wels (born 30 January 1522, died 2 October 1572 in Wels), daughter of Siegmund Ludwig of Perg and Steinhaus and Anna Eckertsau of Bockfliess
          - Andreas, 1527/39, † around 1540
          - Susanna
          - Wolfgang II of Eferding and Oberwallsee, born 1512, † 11 June 1559 in Eferding;
            married Anna de Salamanca von Ortenburg in Vienna on 13 February 1539, daughter of Gabriel I von Salamanca, Count of Ortenburg and Elisabeth von Eberstein; † 26 July 1569 in Eferding
          - Anna, * 1513, † 1551
            married Erasmus d. Ä. von Starhemberg of Wildberg in Linz on 25 November 1529 (1540); Augsburg Confession; † 3 September 1560
          - Magdalena, † 1560 (or December 1563)
            married Kaspar Pflug von Rebenstein of Petschau, Tachau, Schluckenau and Kuttenplan on 4 August 1537; Augsburg Confession; † in Falkenau 1585
          - Itha, 1554/59, † 1568
          - Elisabeth
