= Danubian Limes =

World Heritage Site

Frontiers of the Roman Empire – The Danube Limes
UNESCO World Heritage Site
- Location: Germany, Austria, Slovakia
- Part of: Frontiers of the Roman Empire
- Criteria: Cultural: (ii)(iii)(iv)
- Reference: 1608
- Inscription: 2021 (44th Session)

The Danubian Limes (German: Donaulimes), or Danube Limes, refers to the Roman military frontier or limes which lies along the River Danube in the present-day German state of Bavaria, in Austria, Slovakia, Hungary, Croatia, Serbia, Bulgaria and Romania.

The Danube was not always or everywhere used by the Romans as the military frontier which was moved north or south in some locations according to military conquests, but it was maintained in many places as a fairly permanent defensive structure for long periods. The border was reinforced with numerous watchtowers, legion camps (castra) and forts (castella). Due to the boggy and dendritic nature of the Danube's river banks no border ramparts were built, unlike the Neckar-Odenwald Limes in Germany. The camps were built in the mid-1st century. Later, under Trajan, the camps, which had originally only been surrounded by earthen embankments, were enclosed by stone walls.

A Roman road, the Danube Way (Latin: Via Istrum) was laid along the limes, which linked the stations, camps and forts as far as the Danube Delta.

In 2021, the western segment of the Danube Limes were inscribed on the UNESCO World Heritage List as part of the set of "Frontiers of the Roman Empire" World Heritage Sites.

== Subdivisions ==
Because of the sheer length of this border, the Danubian Limes is often divided into the following subdivisions:

- Rhaetian Limes, only those elements along the Danube being counted as part of the Danubian Limes.
- Noric Limes
- Pannonian Limes (in Upper and Lower Pannonia)
- Moesian Limes
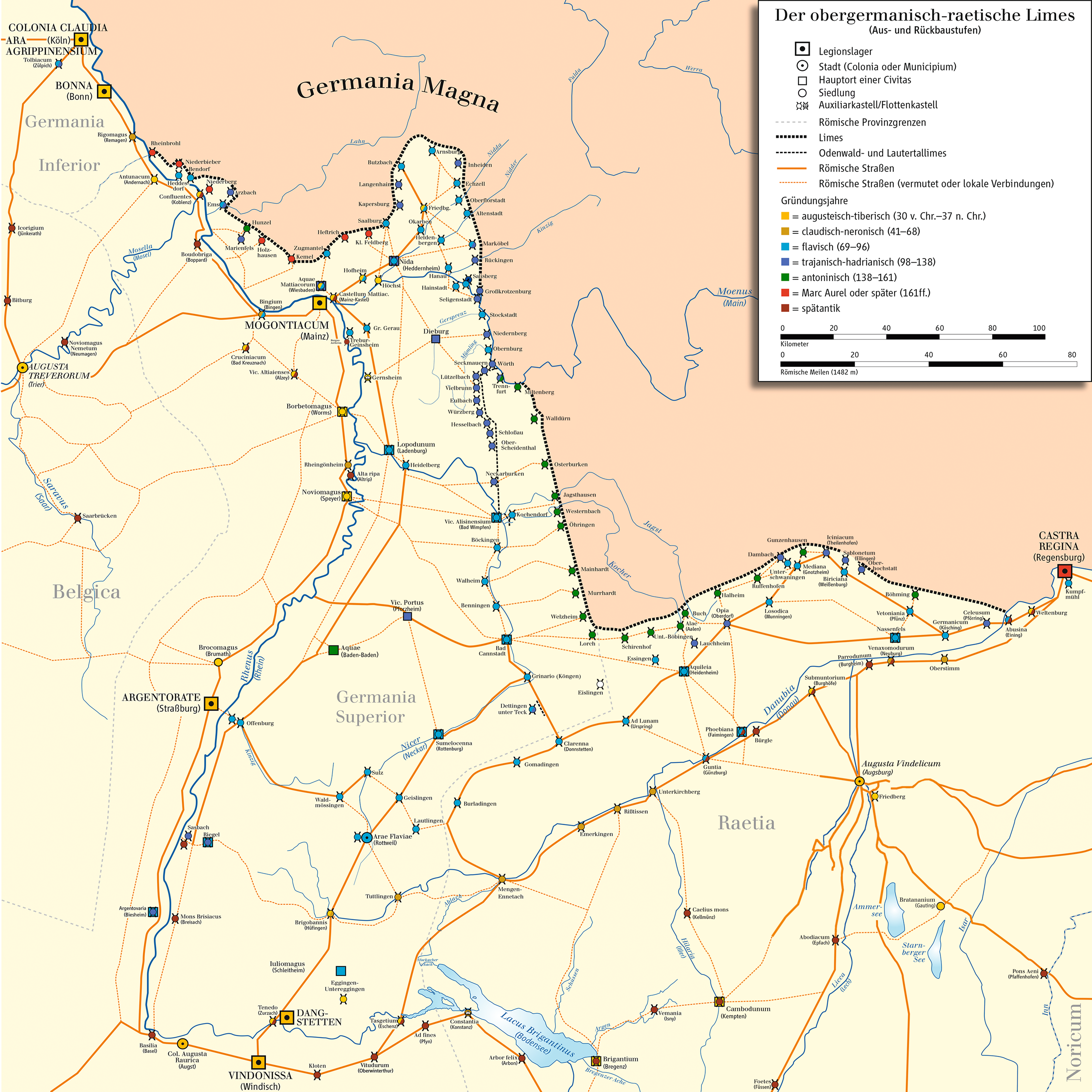
The Upper Germanic-Rhaetian Limes between the Rhine and the Danube

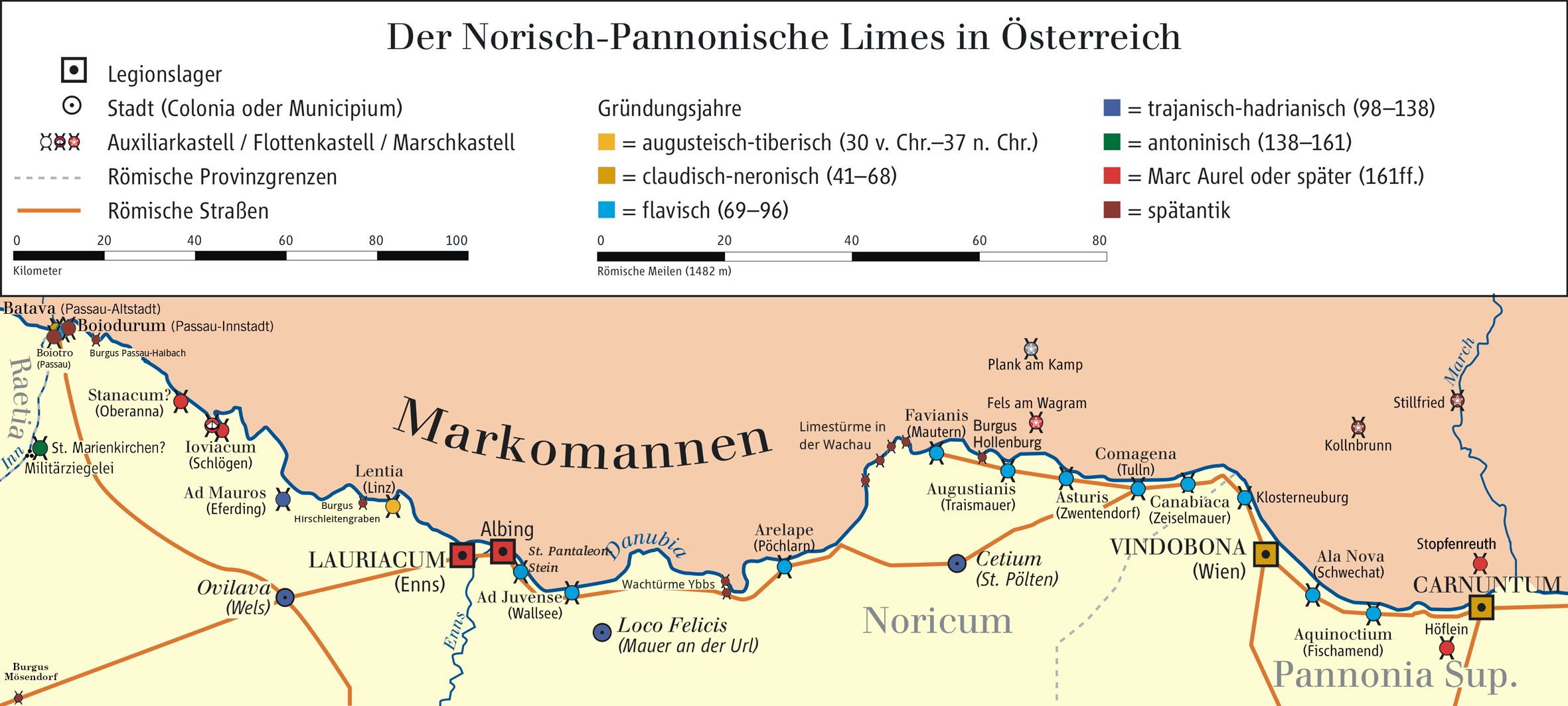
The Noric-Pannonian Limes in present-day Austria

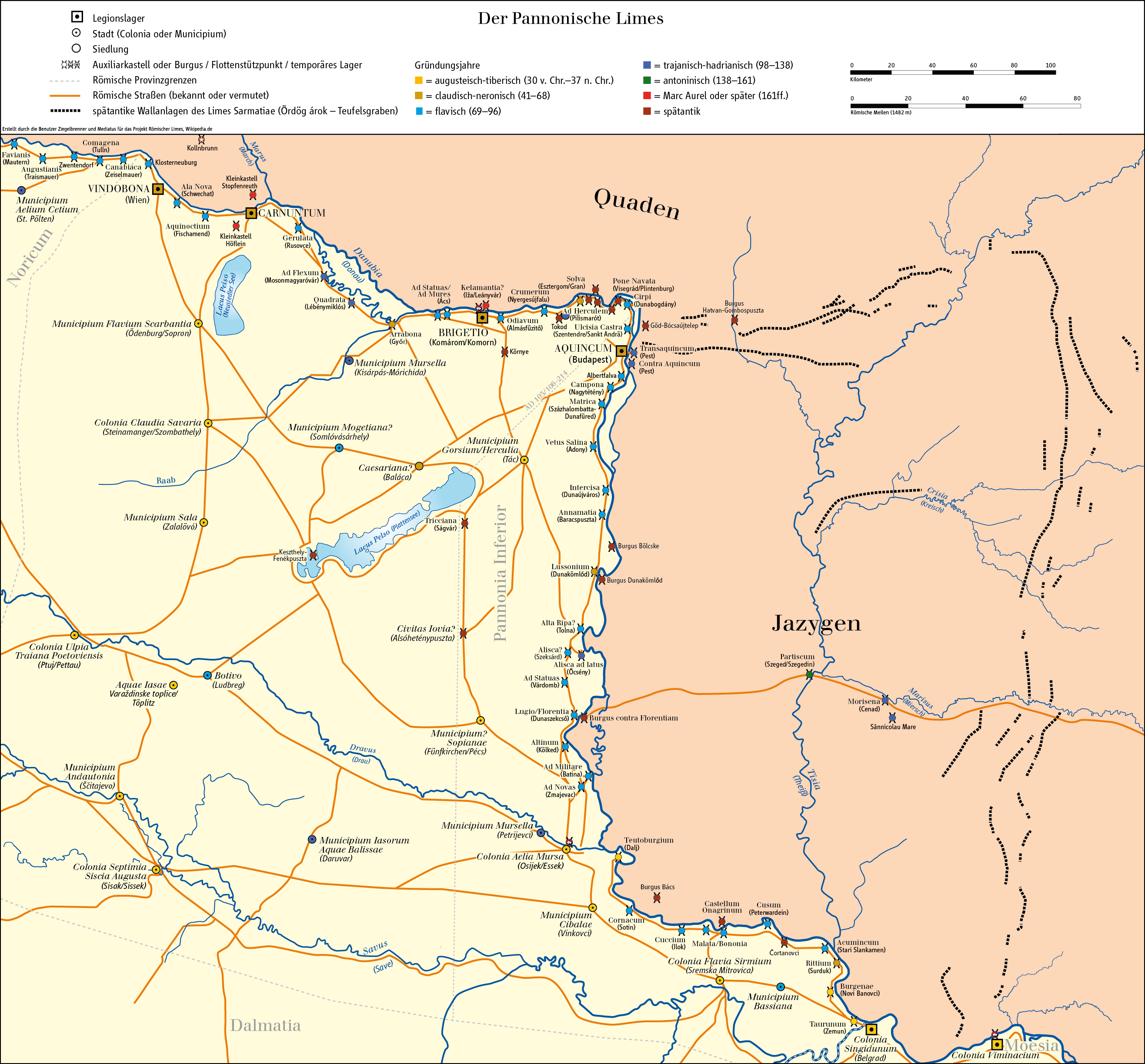
The Pannonian Limes in present-day Slovakia, Hungary, Croatia and Serbia

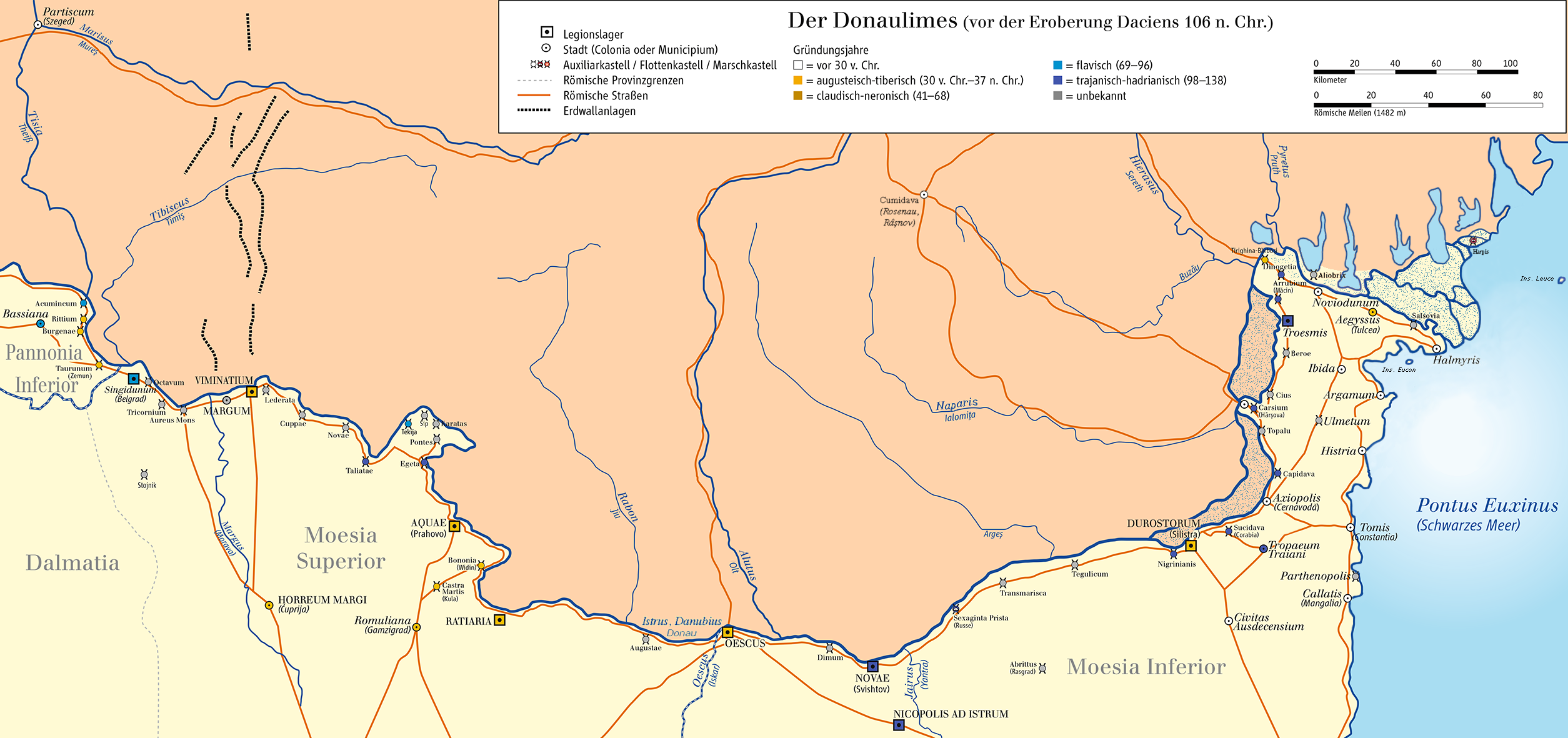
A snapshot of the Moesian Limes of one period in present-day Bulgaria and Romania

== Germany and Austria ==
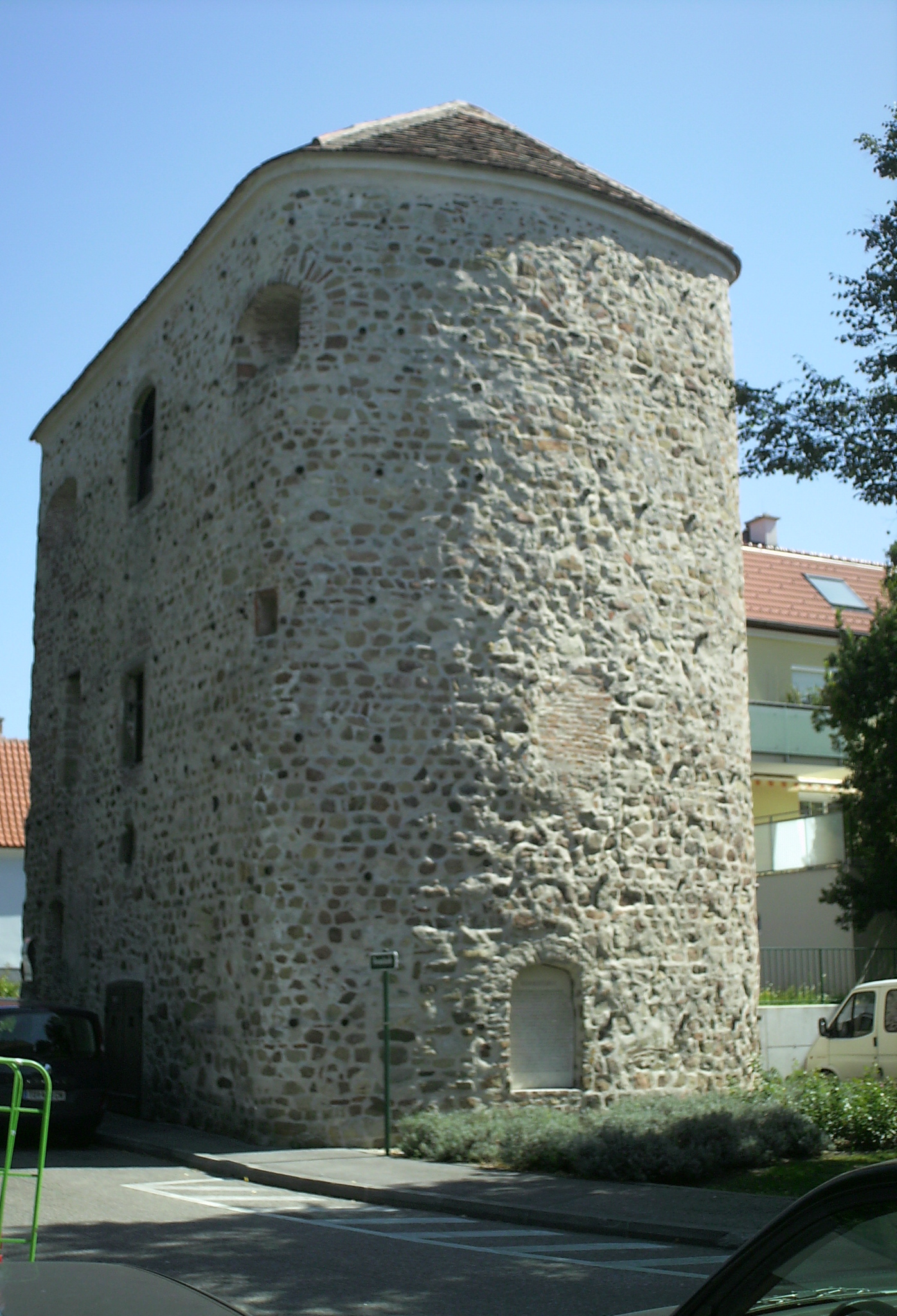
The Salz Tower (Salzturm) in Tulln, Lower Austria, the former western horseshoe tower (Hufeisenturm) at Comagena

The oldest Roman camp in Austria was Carnuntum. Fourteen kilometres away to the west an auxiliary fort (Hilfskastell) was built near Schlögen (today in the municipality of Haibach ob der Donau) in Upper Austria. At that time, the limes ran from Vienna to Linz roughly following the present-day Wiener Straße (B 1).

Because the Danube did not always provide adequate protection, bridgeheads were built on its northern banks against the Marcomanni, such as the one in Stillfried or at the Oberleiser Berg. However, these were cleared again under Marcus Aurelius' son, Commodus, and a seven-kilometre-wide 'death strip' was laid along the Danube.

The increasing number of fortifications that were falling into decay were renovated again under Emperor Valentinian I (364–375) and upgraded to the conform to the latest military tactics. Walls were thickened, and defensive ditches renewed. In addition, towers were built along the walls, such as a watchtower discovered near Oberranna in 1960. These fortifications lasted only another hundred years before the fall of the Roman Empire. In 488 the land of present-day Austria was cleared. The Roman fortifications along the lower courses of the Danube were overhauled once again, especially under Anastasios I and Justinian I. They finally served during Maurice's Balkan campaigns his successor, Phocas, as a basis for larger military operations and some were maintained in the province of Moesia Secunda until the invasion of the Bulgars in 679.

A few defensive towers survive: in Bacharnsdorf in Lower Austria, in Mautern (Favianis) and in Traismauer (Augustiana). In Tulln and Zeiselmauer, too, there are surviving remnants. In the Kürnberg Forest near Linz there are remains of a watchtower from the Roman period.

Legion camps were established in:

- Lauriacum (Enns)
- ? (Albing)
- Vindobona (Wien)
- Carnuntum

Camps (castra) and forts (castella) in Austria from west to east:

- Stanacum (Engelhartszell)
- Ioviacum (Schlögen)
- Ad Mauros (Eferding)
- Lentia (Linz)
- Ad Iuvense (Wallsee)
- Arelape (Pöchlarn)
- Namare (Melk an der Donau)
- Favianis (Mautern)
- Barbaricum (Fels am Wagram – nördlich der Donau)
- Augustianis (Traismauer)
- Asturis (Zwentendorf)
- Comagena (Tulln)
- Cannabiaca (Zeiselmauer)
- Arrianis/Asturis (Klosterneuburg)
- Ala Nova (Schwechat)
- ? (Mikulov-Tschechien)
- Aequinoctium (Fischamend)
- Roman fort, Höflein (Höflein)
- Roman fort, Stopfenreuth (Engelhartstetten)

== Lower Pannonia ==
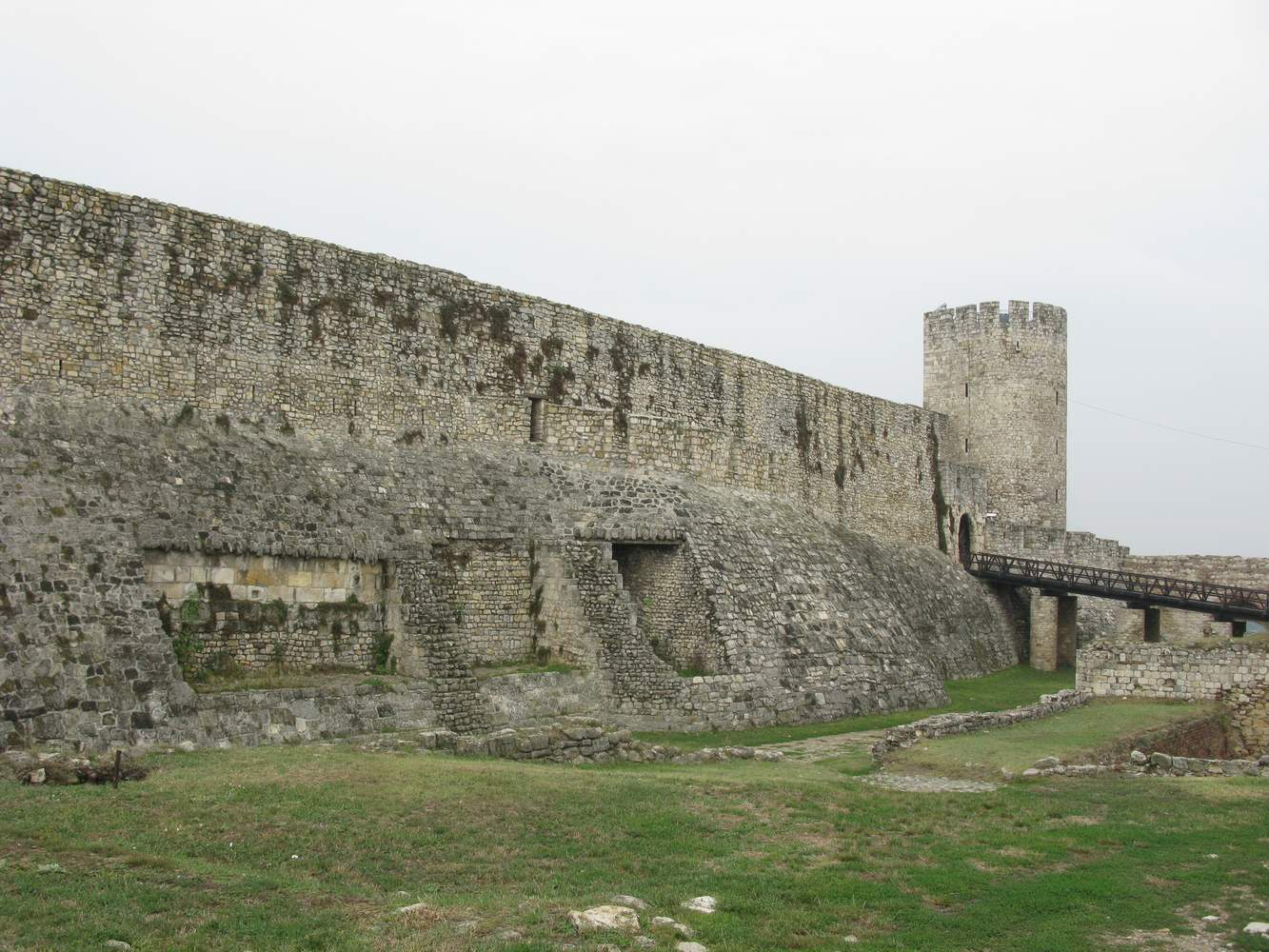
Remains of the castrum in the Belgrade Fortress

In 103 AD, Emperor Trajan divided the province of Pannonia into two parts: Pannonia Superior and Pannonia Inferior, or Lower Pannonia. The Lower Pannonia province ran along the eastern side of the Danube, today a part of Hungary, Serbia, Croatia, and Bosnia and Herzegovina. Colonies and towns were built throughout the area on both sides of the Danube, in addition to Roman forts, garrisons, and bases. Some of the most notable were:

- Transaquincum, Contra Aquincum (Pest)
- Matrica (Százhalombatta)
- Gorsium (Tác)
- Vetus Salina (Adony)
- Intercisa (Dunaújváros)
- Lussonium (Dunakömlőd)
- Alisca ad latus (Őcsény)
- Ad Statuas (Várdomb)
- Lugio/Florentia (Dunaszekcső)
- Altinum (Kölked)
- Ad Militare (Batina)
- Ad Novas (Zmajevac)
- Colonia Aelia Mursa (Osijek)
- Teutoburgium (Dalj)
- Cuccium (Ilok)
- Cusum (Petrovaradin)
- Burgenae (Novi Banovci)
- Colonia Singidunum (Belgrade)

== Lower Danube ==
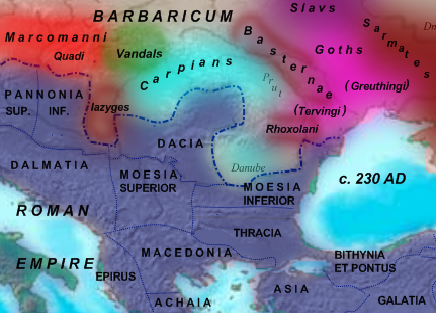
Roman provinces and barbarians at the Lower Danube around 200 AD

The Lower Danubian Limes and the northern Balkans in the 6th century. Depicted are the provinces, major settlements and military roads

The Lower Danubian Road was built under Emperor Tiberius in the 1st century AD on the right (southern) bank of the river and forts and watchtowers were also built as part of the limes linked by the road. The following Roman forts were the first to be established here during the 1st century:

- Augustae (near the village of Hurlets)
- Valeriana (near the village of Dolni Vadin)
- Variana (near the village of Leskowez)
- Almus (near the town of Lom)
- Regianum (near the town of Kozloduy)
- Sexaginta Prista (near the town of Ruse)
- Dorostorum (near the town of Silistra)
- Ratiaria (near the town of Artschar)
- Novae (near the town of Svishtov)
- Viminatium
- Singidunum (Belgrad)
- Oescus

== Literature ==
- Ralph F. Hoddinott: Bulgaria in Antiquity. An archeological introduction. Ernest Benn Ltd., London, 1975, ISBN 0-510-03281-8, pp. 111–142.
- Kurt Genser: Der Donaulimes in Österreich (= Schriften des Limesmuseums Aalen. Vol. 44). Württembergisches Landesmuseum, Stuttgart, 1990.
- Gerda von Bülow et al. (eds.): Der Limes an der unteren Donau von Diokletian bis Heraklios. Vorträge der Internationalen Konferenz Svištov, Bulgarien (1–5 September 1998). Verlag NOUS, Sofia, 1999, ISBN 954-90387-2-6.
- Susanne Biegert (ed.): Von Augustus bis Attila. Leben am ungarischen Donaulimes (= Schriften des Limesmuseums Aalen. Vol. 53). Theiss, Stuttgart, 2000, ISBN 3-8062-1541-3.
- Herwig Friesinger et al. (eds.): Der römische Limes in Österreich. Führer zu den archäologischen Denkmälern. 2nd, revised edition. Verlag der Österreichischen Akademie der Wissenschaften, Vienna, 2002, ISBN 3-7001-2618-2.
- Sonja Jilek: Grenzen des Römischen Reiches: Der Donaulimes, eine römische Flussgrenze. Uniwersytet Warszawski, Warsaw, 2009, ISBN 978-83-928330-7-9.
- Breeze, David J.; Schwarcz, Andreas; Ployer, René (2023). The Danube limes in Austria. Oxford: Archaeopress. ISBN 9781803276083.
