= Hartheim =

Hartheim may refer to:

Germany:

- Hartheim am Rhein
- Hartheim, Meßstetten, part of Meßstetten

Austria:

- Hartheim, Alkoven, part of Alkoven
- Hartheim killing centre in Hartheim, Alkoven
- Schloss Hartheim, Alkoven
