= Schloss Hartheim =

Castle at Alkoven in Upper Austria

Coordinates: 48°16′52″N 14°06′50″E

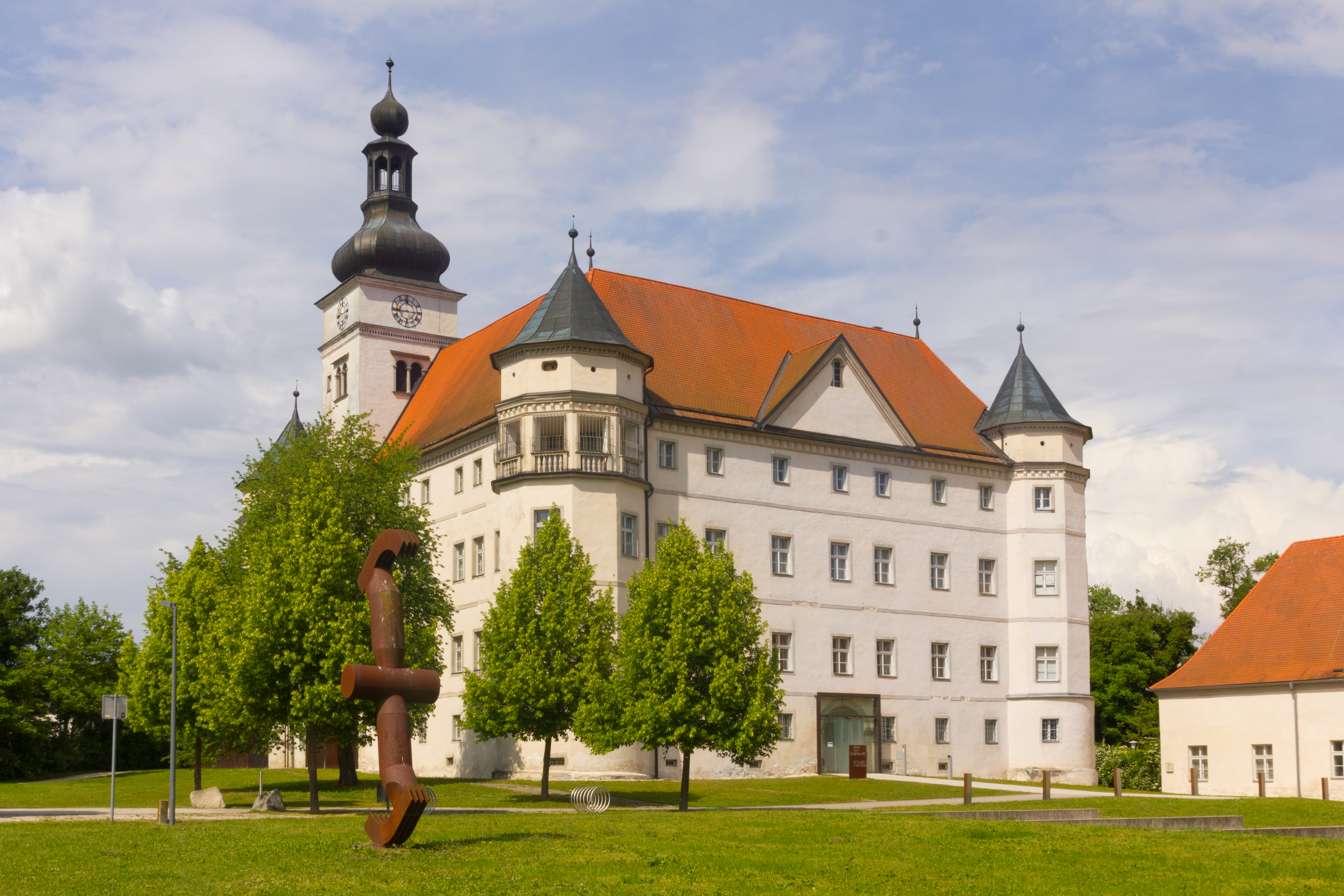
Hartheim Castle

Schloss Hartheim, also known as Hartheim Castle, is a castle at Alkoven in Upper Austria, some 14 kilometres (9 mi) from Linz, Austria. It was built by Jakob von Aspen in 1600, and it is a prominent Renaissance castle in the country.

The building became notorious as one of the centers for the Nazi program known as Aktion T4, in which German citizens deemed mentally or physically unfit were systematically murdered with poison gas. After the official end of Aktion T4 in August 1941, the facility was used to murder Jews, communists, and other concentration camp prisoners under a program known as "Action 14f13". In this capacity it was known as the Hartheim killing centre, where the Nazis murdered a total of 30,000 people.

== History before 1940 ==
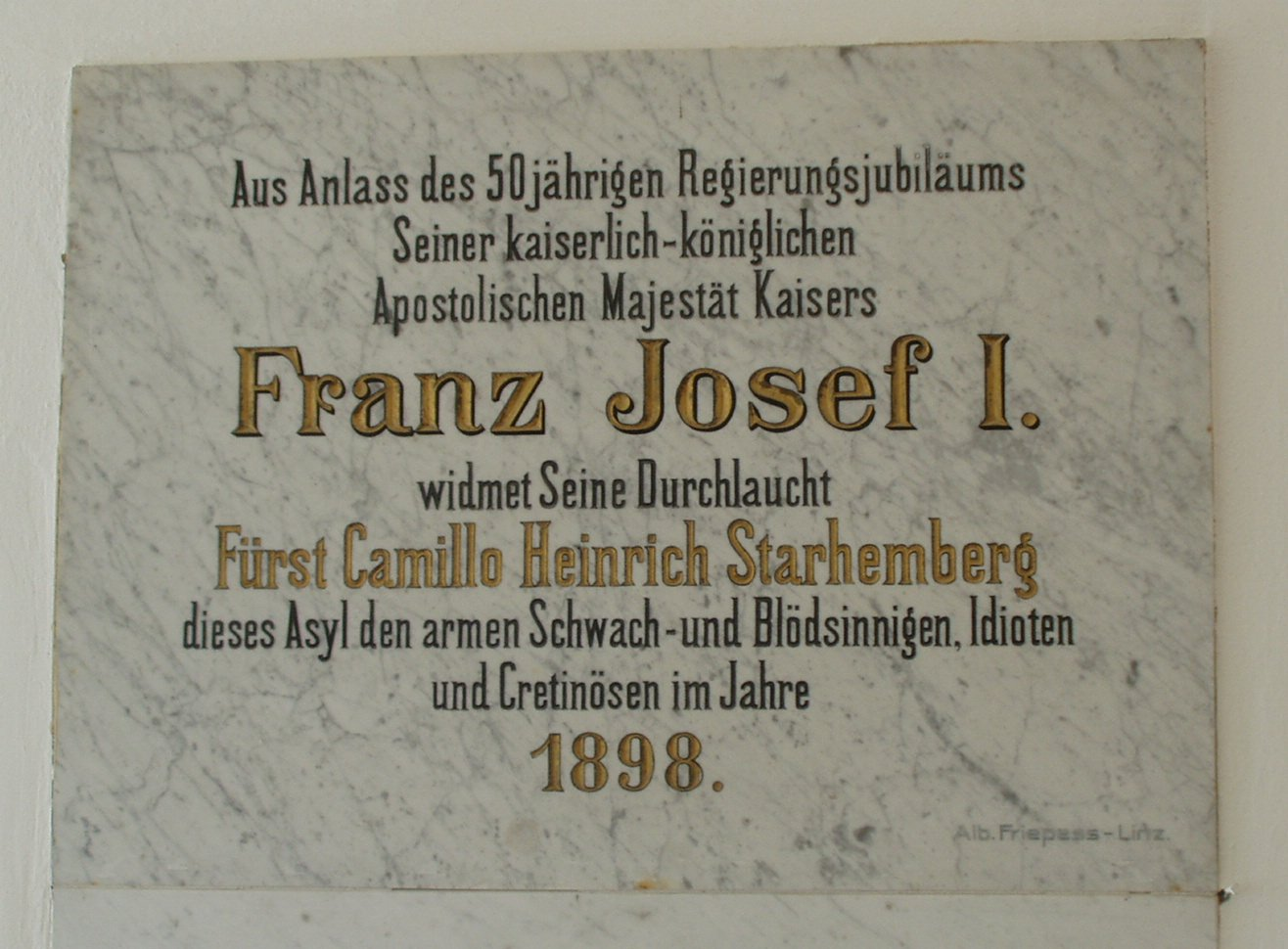
Tablet commemorating its gifting to the OÖ Landeswohltätigkeitsverein in 1898

Hartheim lies in the middle of the so-called Eferding Basin, that runs along the River Danube from Ottensheim to Aschach an der Donau. As early as 1130, a family with the name Hartheim is mentioned in the records. They were vassals of the bishops of Passau. In 1287, three brothers, Conrad, Peter and Henry of Hartheim, were named as owners of the castle as part of a barter arrangement with the Wilhering Abbey. In any case by 1323, another family was named as the owners. Until the middle of the 14th century the site consisted mainly of just one tower, subsequently a residence was added and it was surrounded by a small wall with ramparts and ditches.

After changing hands several times the castle ended up in the possession of the Aspen family, who probably built the castle into its present shape. At the beginning of the 1690s they had a completely new castle built conforming to perceptions of the ideal Renaissance style with a regular four-winged building with four polygonal corner towers and a higher central tower.

In 1799, Georg Adam, Prince of Starhemberg, purchased the castle. However, by 1862 the castle was in a rather poor condition, as a contemporary report describes: "Doors, windows and ovens are entirely missing, ... and several ceilings must be replaced."

In 1898, Camillo Henry, Prince of Starhemberg, donated the castle building, the outbuildings and some land to the Upper Austrian State Welfare Society (Oberösterreichischen Landeswohltätigkeitsverein or OÖ. LWV). It was intended to use further donation to convert the building into an "Idiot's Institute" as it was described at the time. In addition between 1900 and 1910 major renovation and conversion work was carried out to enable the building to be used as a care home for mentally handicapped people. In 1926, a staircase was dismantled and replaced by a bed lift.

== Nazi era and aftermath ==
Beginning in 1939, the Nazis used Hartheim and five other sites as killing facilities for Aktion T4, which performed mass sterilizations and mass murder of "undesirable" members of German society, specifically those with physical and mental disabilities. In total, an estimated 200,000 people were murdered across all these facilities, including thousands of children. These actions were in keeping with Nazi ideas about eugenics. While officially ended in 1941, Aktion T4 lasted until the German surrender in 1945.

During the first phase of Aktion T4 at Schloss Hartheim, about 18,000 people with physical and mental disabilities were murdered by gassing with carbon monoxide. The facility was also used to murder about twelve thousand prisoners from the Dachau and Mauthausen concentration camps who were sent here to be gassed, as were hundreds of women sent from Ravensbrück concentration camp in 1944, predominantly tuberculosis sufferers and those deemed mentally infirm. The castle was regularly visited by the psychiatrists Karl Brandt, Professor of Psychiatry at Würzburg University, and Werner Heyde. In December 1944 Schloss Hartheim was closed as an extermination centre and restored as a sanatorium after being cleared of evidence of the crimes committed therein.

In 1946, Alice Ricciardi-von Platen, a psychiatrist and psychoanalyst who practised near Linz, Austria, was invited to join the German team observing the so-called Doctors' trial in Nuremberg. The trial was presided over by American judges, who indicted Karl Brandt and 22 others. The 16 who were convicted included Josef Mengele; seven were sentenced to death. Her 1948 book, Die Tötung Geisteskranker in Deutschland, ("The killing of the mentally ill in Germany"), was judged a scandal by German medical professionals.

After World War II, the building was converted into apartments. In 1969, the first memorial rooms were opened in the former gas chamber and admission room. Since 2003, Hartheim Castle has been a memorial site dedicated to the ten thousands of physically and mentally handicapped persons, concentration camp prisoners and forced laborers who were murdered there by the Nazis. Also in 2003 the exhibition "Value of Life" was opened.

== Sources ==
- Pierre Serge Choumoff, Les Assassinats Nationaux-Socialistes par Gaz en Territoire Autrichien, Vienna, Bundesministerium für Inneres, 2000, ISBN 978-3-9500867-1-3
- Nazi Medicine and the Nuremberg Trials (PDF) Table of contents, introduction and index only.
- Eutanasia, le radici dello sterminio (in Italian)
