= Schartner Bombe =

Austrian soft drink

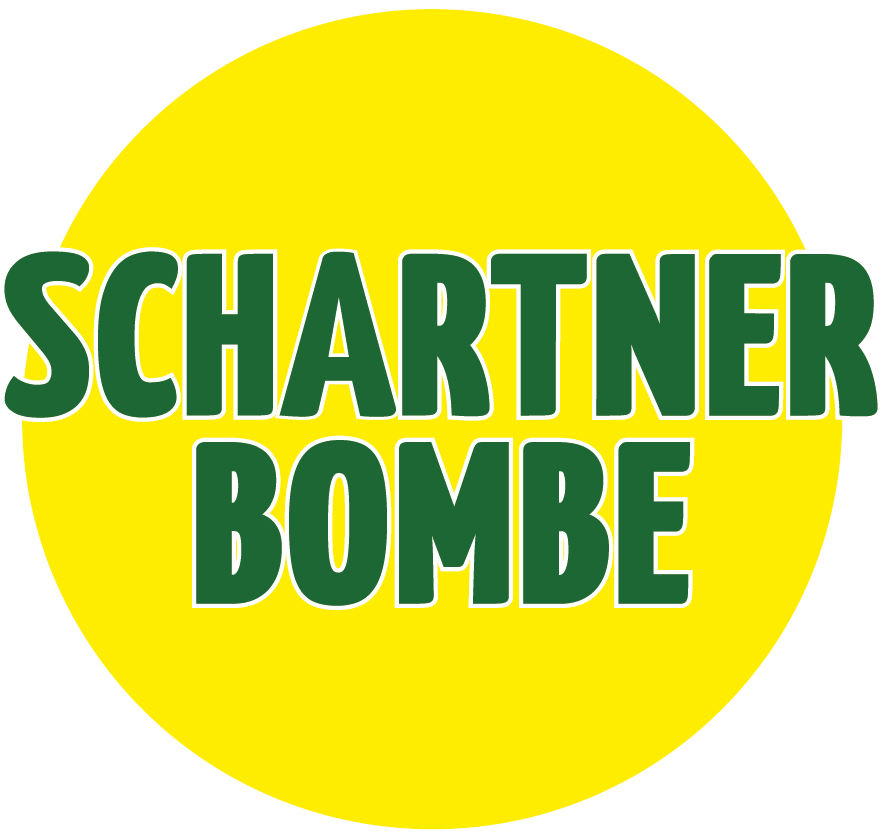
- Type: soft drink
- Manufacturer: Starzinger
- Origin: Austria
- Introduced: 1926
- Ingredients: Carbonated water, sugar, flavor, acid and dyes

Schartner Bombe is a popular carbonated soft drink from Austria, manufactured by Starzinger in Frankenmarkt. It's available in the flavors cherry, cola, orange, lemon, orange & grapefruit, raspberry, herbs, ACE, pineapple, ice tea lemon and ice tea peach and can be purchased in PET bottles, glass bottles and cans.

== History ==
In 1905, a healing spring in the village of Leppersdorf in the municipality of Scharten was discovered. In 1926, Otto Burger had the idea to enhance the springwater by adding fruit syrup and selling it under the name "Schartner Bombe" (eng.:"a bomb from Scharten"). Its name is derived from the bomb-like shape of the initial design of the bottle. The brand was first recognized in the commercial register in 1927 and sales were steady, even during the Great Depression. After Burger's death in 1940, the brand was handed over to Lichtenegger Nährmittel Werke. In the 1960s, Schartner Bombe was bought by Mühlgrub brewery in Bad Hall, which expanded production extensively by building the world's largest bottling line in 1969. Local water from Bad Hall was used from 1975 on. After multiple ownership changes, today's manufacturer Starzinger eventually obtained the rights to produce the soft drink in 1995 and managed to revive marketing greatly, after revenue was at an all-time low.

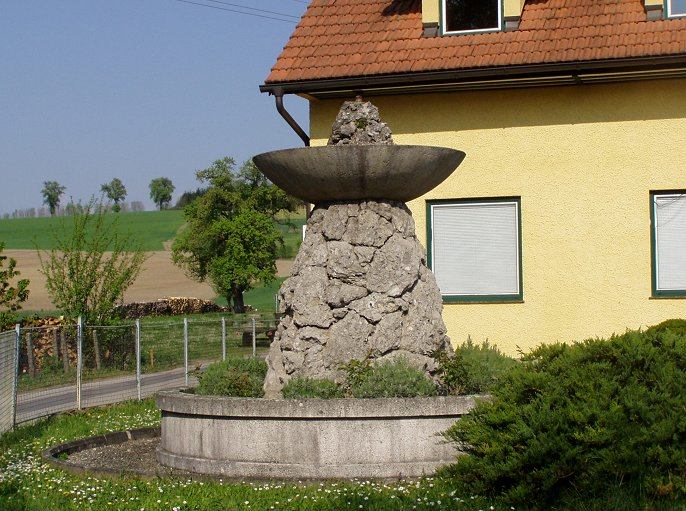
the spring in Leppersdorf
