= Stroheim =

- Municipality
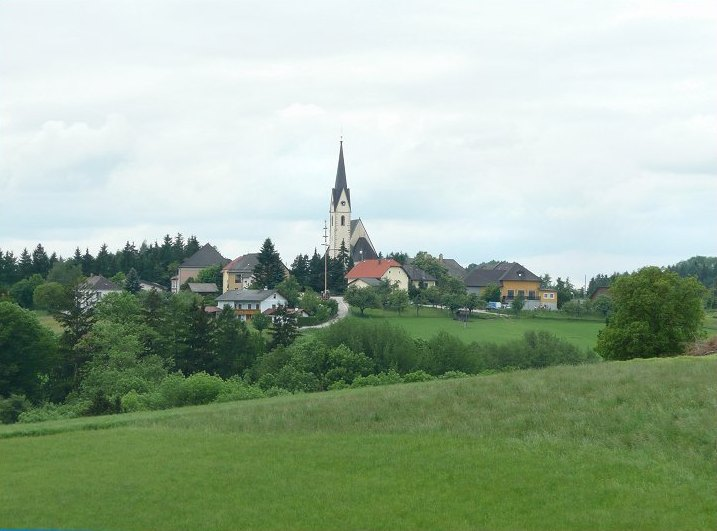

- Coat of arms

- Location within Austria
- Coordinates: 48°20′20″N 13°57′30″E
- Country: Austria
- State: Upper Austria
- District: Eferding

Government
  - Mayor: Franz Breuer (ÖVP)

Area
  - Total: 28.75 km^{2} (11.10 sq mi)
- Elevation: 489 m (1,604 ft)

Population (2018-01-01)
  - Total: 1,555
  - Density: 54.09/km^{2} (140.1/sq mi)
- Time zone: UTC+1 (CET)
  - Summer (DST): UTC+2 (CEST)
- Postal code: 4074
- Area code: 07272
- Vehicle registration: EF
- Website: www.stroheim.at

Stroheim is a municipality in the district of Eferding in the Austrian state of Upper Austria.

== Geography ==
Stroheim lies in the Hausruckviertel on a ridge overlooking the Eferding Basin. About 29 percent of the municipality is forest and 63 percent farmland.
