= Sankt Marienkirchen an der Polsenz =

- Municipality
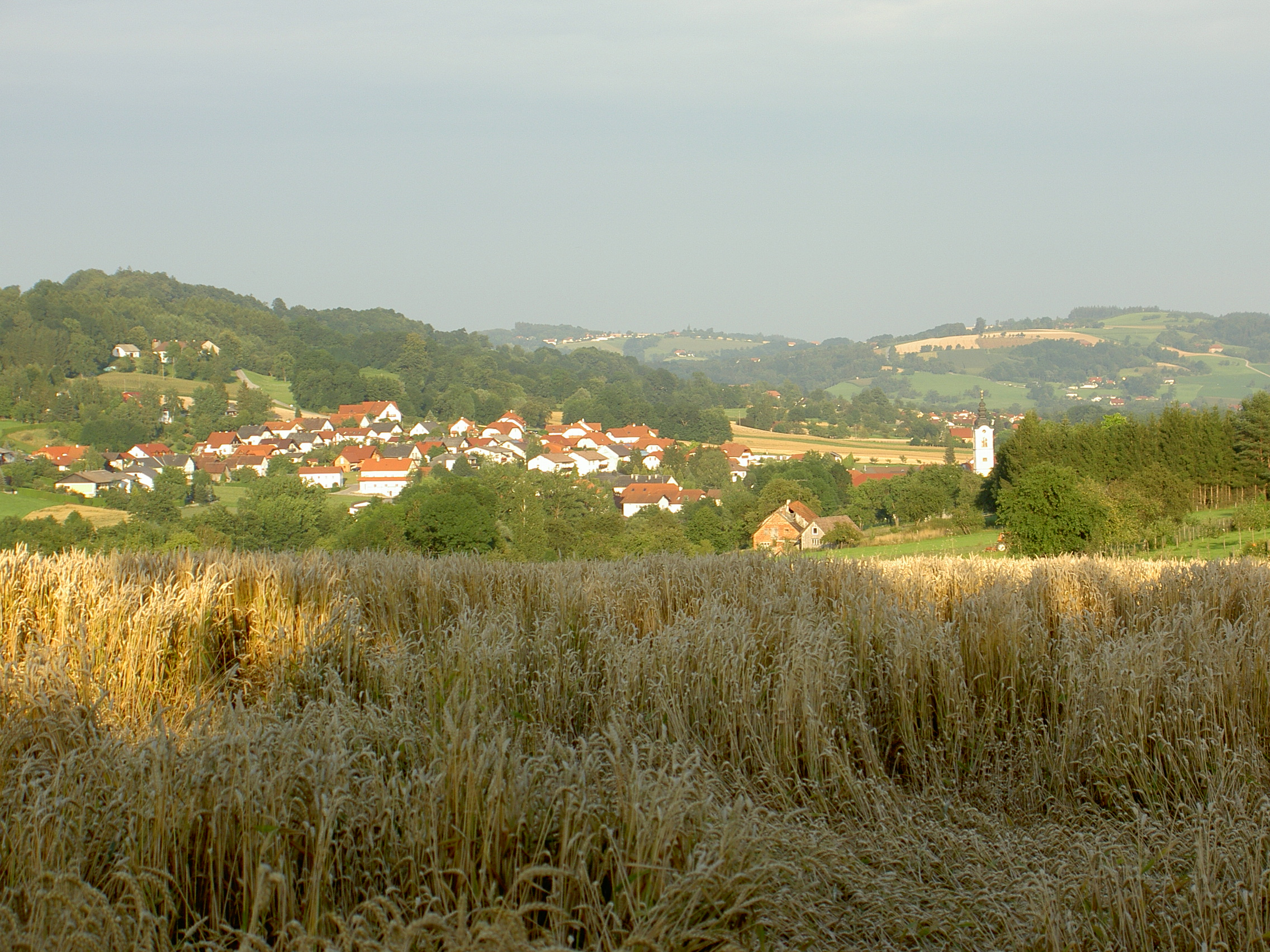

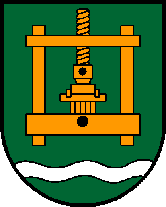
- Coat of arms

- Location within Austria
- Coordinates: 48°15′50″N 13°55′50″E
- Country: Austria
- State: Upper Austria
- District: Eferding

Government
  - Mayor: Josef Dopler (ÖVP)

Area
  - Total: 23.84 km^{2} (9.20 sq mi)
- Elevation: 315 m (1,033 ft)

Population (2018-01-01)
  - Total: 2,337
  - Density: 98.03/km^{2} (253.9/sq mi)
- Time zone: UTC+1 (CET)
  - Summer (DST): UTC+2 (CEST)
- Postal code: 4076, 4075, 4732
- Area code: 07249
- Vehicle registration: EF
- Website: st-marienkirchen-polsenz

Sankt Marienkirchen an der Polsenz is a municipality in the district of Eferding in the Austrian state of Upper Austria.

== Population ==
Historical population
Year	Pop.	±%
1869	2,088	—
1880	1,956	−6.3%
1890	1,946	−0.5%
1900	1,865	−4.2%
1910	1,863	−0.1%
1923	1,864	+0.1%
1934	1,801	−3.4%
1939	1,669	−7.3%
1951	1,738	+4.1%
1961	1,592	−8.4%
1971	1,645	+3.3%
1981	1,754	+6.6%
1991	1,985	+13.2%
2001	2,192	+10.4%
2011	2,271	+3.6%
