= Pupping =

- Municipality
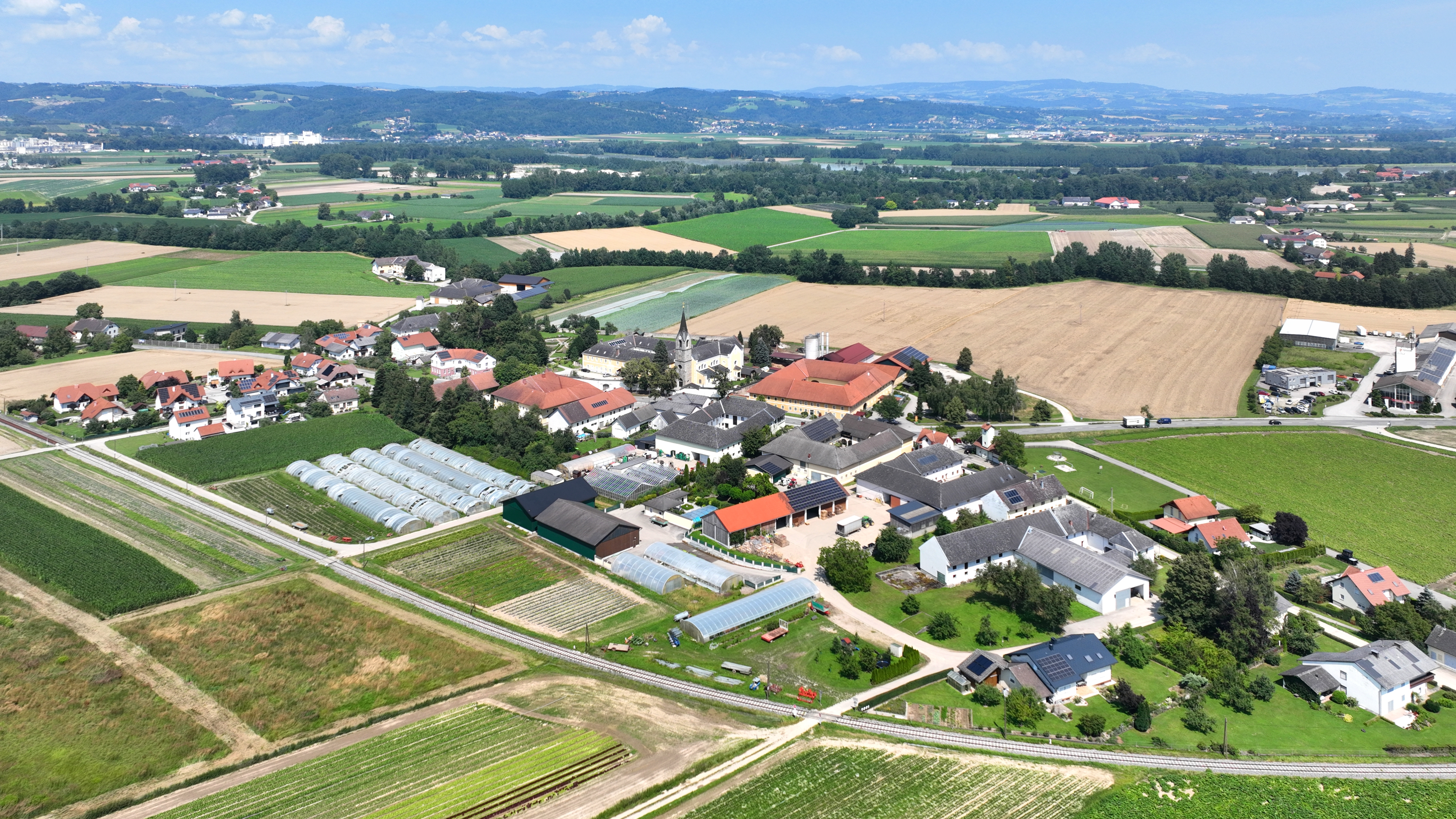
- Southwest view of Pupping

- Coat of arms

- Location within Austria
- Coordinates: 48°20′10″N 14°00′00″E
- Country: Austria
- State: Upper Austria
- District: Eferding

Government
  - Mayor: Hubert Schlucker (ÖVP)

Area
  - Total: 13.34 km^{2} (5.15 sq mi)
- Elevation: 270 m (890 ft)

Population (2018-01-01)
  - Total: 1,824
  - Density: 136.7/km^{2} (354.1/sq mi)
- Time zone: UTC+1 (CET)
  - Summer (DST): UTC+2 (CEST)
- Postal code: 4070
- Area code: 07272
- Vehicle registration: EF
- Website: www.pupping.at

Pupping is a municipality in the district of Eferding in the Austrian state of Upper Austria. St. Wolfgang of Regensburg died here in the Chapel of Saint Othmar while on his way to Hungary for a mission.

== Geography ==
Pupping lies in the Hausruckviertel. About 16 percent is forest and 63 percent farmland.
