= Prambachkirchen =

- Municipality
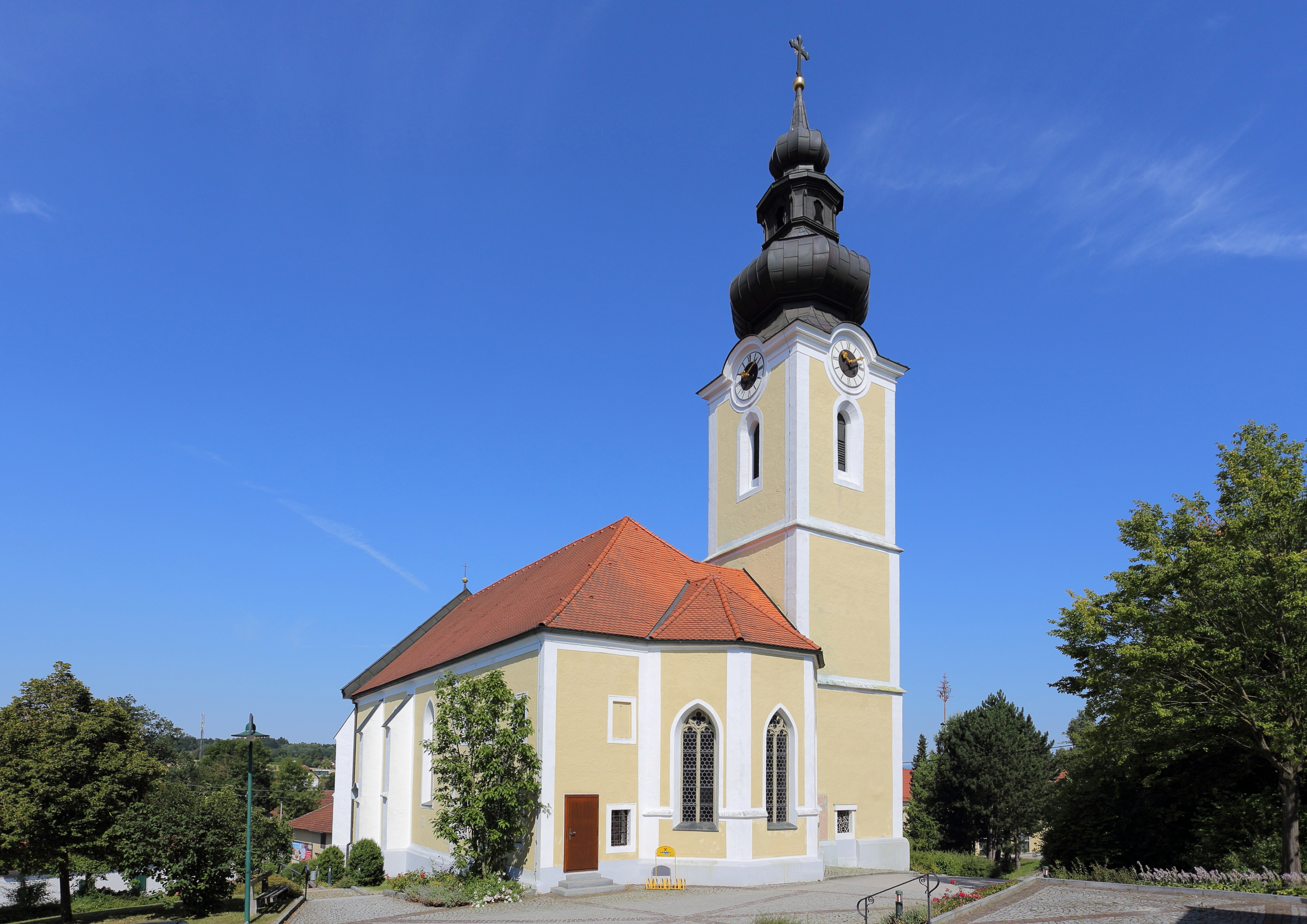

- Coat of arms

- Location within Austria
- Coordinates: 48°19′0″N 13°54′0″E
- Country: Austria
- State: Upper Austria
- District: Eferding

Government
  - Mayor: Herbert Holzinger (ÖVP)

Area
  - Total: 28.73 km^{2} (11.09 sq mi)
- Elevation: 374 m (1,227 ft)

Population (2018-01-01)
  - Total: 2,919
  - Density: 101.6/km^{2} (263.1/sq mi)
- Time zone: UTC+1 (CET)
  - Summer (DST): UTC+2 (CEST)
- Postal code: 4731
- Area code: 07277
- Vehicle registration: EF
- Website: www.prambachkirchen.at

Prambachkirchen is a town in the district of Eferding in the Austrian state of Upper Austria.

== Population ==
Historical population
| Year | Pop. | ±% |
|---|---|---|
| 1869 | 2,213 | — |
| 1880 | 2,137 | −3.4% |
| 1890 | 2,112 | −1.2% |
| 1900 | 2,058 | −2.6% |
| 1910 | 2,100 | +2.0% |
| 1923 | 2,118 | +0.9% |
| 1934 | 2,308 | +9.0% |
| 1939 | 2,147 | −7.0% |
| 1951 | 2,362 | +10.0% |
| 1961 | 2,307 | −2.3% |
| 1971 | 2,498 | +8.3% |
| 1981 | 2,502 | +0.2% |
| 1991 | 2,625 | +4.9% |
| 2001 | 2,799 | +6.6% |
| 2011 | 2,832 | +1.2% |
