= Steier =

Steier is a surname. Notable people with the surname include:

- Andreas Steier (born 1972), German engineer and politician
- Lisa Steier (1888–1928), Swedish ballerina and ballet master
- Lydia Steier (born 1978), American opera director
- Rick Steier (born 1960), American guitarist
- Jonathan J Steier (born 1988), American Engineer and Entrepreneur.

== See also ==
- Sztajer, a transliteration into Polish
