= Eferding District =

Coordinates: 48.317°N 14.006°E

Eferding District Bezirk Eferding
- District
- Country: Austria
- State: Upper Austria
- Number of municipalities: 12
- Administrative seat: Eferding
- Seat: Grieskirchen

Government
  - District Governor: Christoph Schweitzer

Area
  - Total: 259.5 km^{2} (100.2 sq mi)

Population (2026)
  - Total: 33,884
  - Density: 130.6/km^{2} (338.2/sq mi)
- Time zone: UTC+01:00 (CET)
  - Summer (DST): UTC+02:00 (CEST)
- Vehicle registration: EF

Bezirk Eferding is a district of the state of Upper Austria in Austria.

== Municipalities ==
Towns (Städte) are indicated in boldface; market towns (Marktgemeinden) in italics; suburbs, hamlets and other subdivisions of a municipality are indicated in small characters.

- Alkoven
- Aschach an der Donau
- **Eferding**
- Fraham
- Haibach ob der Donau
- Hartkirchen
- Hinzenbach
- Prambachkirchen
- Pupping
- Scharten
- Sankt Marienkirchen an der Polsenz
- Stroheim
