= Gemeinlebarn =

Coordinates: 48°20′N 15°48′E

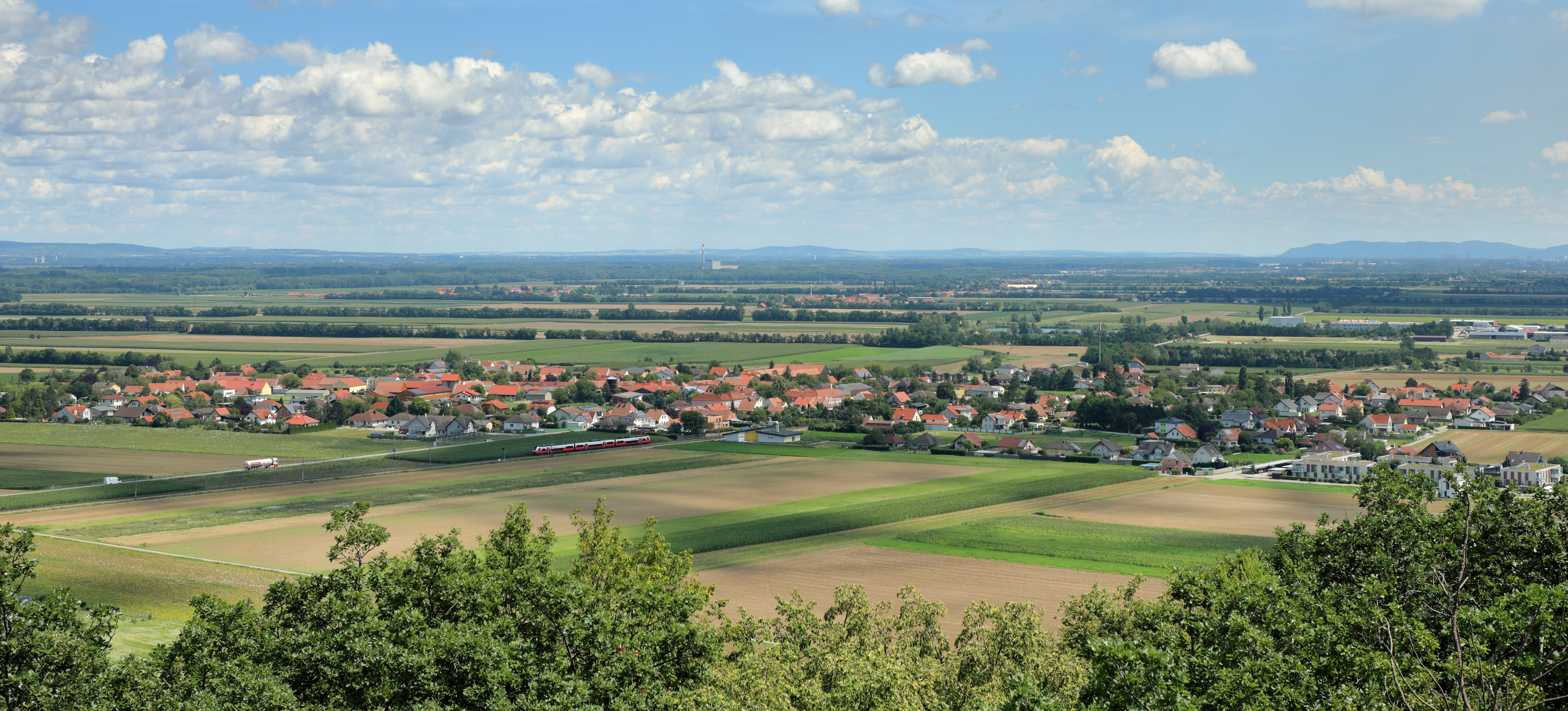
West-southwest view of Gemeinlebarn

Gemeinlebarn is an Austrian village in the community of Traismauer in the district of Sankt Pölten-Land, Lower Austria. Its population is about 1000 inhabitants. Its Old High German name is Lewary and so most of the native "Gemeinlebarner" (citizen of Gemeinlebarn in German) call it Lewing.

The village is placed in the west of "Tullner Becken" (the lowland around the city of Tulln and its surrounding).
