= Scharten =

- Municipality
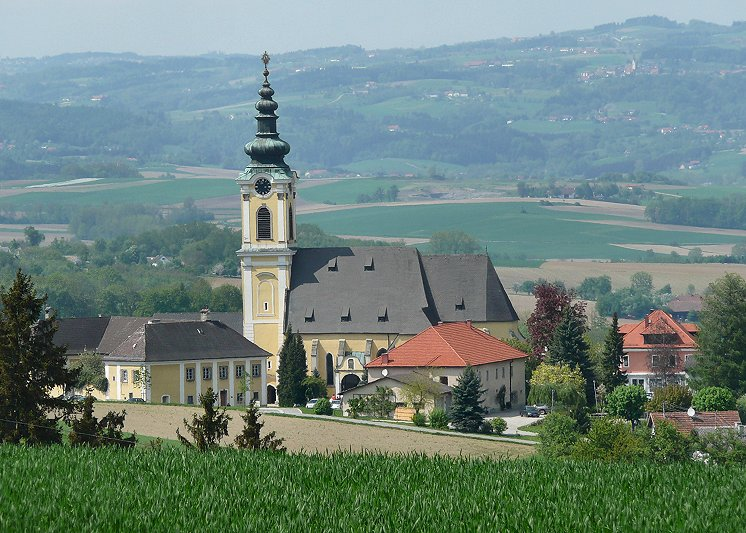

- Coat of arms

- Location within Austria
- Coordinates: 48°15′10″N 14°02′10″E
- Country: Austria
- State: Upper Austria
- District: Eferding

Government
  - Mayor: Christian Steiner (temporary) (ÖVP)

Area
  - Total: 17.5 km^{2} (6.8 sq mi)
- Elevation: 397 m (1,302 ft)

Population (2018-01-01)
  - Total: 2,252
  - Density: 129/km^{2} (333/sq mi)
- Time zone: UTC+1 (CET)
  - Summer (DST): UTC+2 (CEST)
- Postal code: 4612
- Area code: 07272
- Vehicle registration: EF
- Website: www.scharten.at

Scharten is a municipality in the district of Eferding in the Austrian state of Upper Austria.

== Geography ==
Scharten lies in the Hausruckviertel. About 11 percent of the municipality is forest and 75 percent farmland.

== See also ==
Schartner Bombe
