= Traismauer =

- Municipality
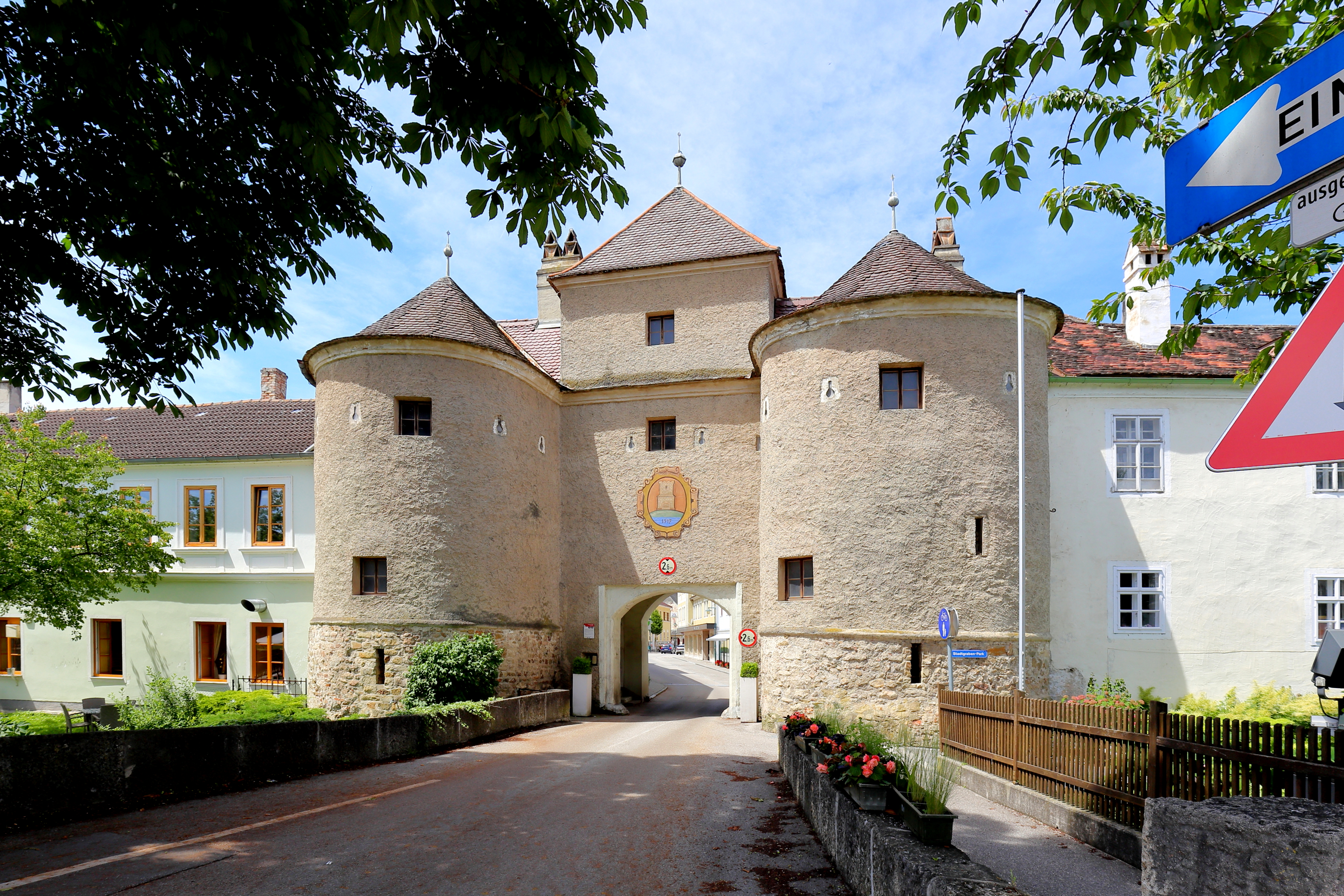
- The Roman Gate in Traismauer

- Coat of arms

- Location within Austria
- Coordinates: 48°21′00″N 15°44′40″E
- Country: Austria
- State: Lower Austria
- District: Sankt Pölten-Land

Government
  - Mayor: Herbert Pfeffer (SPÖ)

Area
  - Total: 43.11 km^{2} (16.64 sq mi)
- Elevation: 197 m (646 ft)

Population (2018-01-01)
  - Total: 6,224
  - Density: 144.4/km^{2} (373.9/sq mi)
- Time zone: UTC+1 (CET)
  - Summer (DST): UTC+2 (CEST)
- Postal code: 3133
- Area code: 02783, 02276 (Gemeinlebarn)
- Vehicle registration: PL
- Website: www.traismauer.at

Traismauer is a municipality in the district of Sankt Pölten-Land in Lower Austria, Austria. It was established by the Romans, probably on a location of prior settlements. Some Roman buildings survive to this day.

== Population ==
Historical population
Year	Pop.	±%
1869	3,240	—
1880	3,773	+16.5%
1890	3,853	+2.1%
1900	3,980	+3.3%
1910	4,000	+0.5%
1923	3,925	−1.9%
1934	4,054	+3.3%
1939	3,904	−3.7%
1951	4,839	+23.9%
1961	5,115	+5.7%
1971	5,360	+4.8%
1981	5,160	−3.7%
1991	5,137	−0.4%
2001	5,618	+9.4%
2011	5,912	+5.2%

== See also ==
- Gemeinlebarn
