= Chaim Sztajer =

Polish-Jewish Holocaust survivor

- Born: 15 July 1909; Częstochowa, Poland
- Died: 16 February 2008 (aged 98); Melbourne, Victoria, Australia
- Occupation: Carpenter
- Known for: Treblinka survivor
- Notable work: Model of Treblinka extermination camp (displayed at Jewish Holocaust Centre in Elsternwick, Victoria, Australia)
- Spouses: Hela Majorczyk (m. 1939; died 1942) Chana Sztal (m. 1945; died 1971) Rosa Granek (m. 1973)

Chaim Sztajer (15 July 1909 – 16 February 2008) was a Polish-Jewish Holocaust survivor known for his participation in the Treblinka uprising. Sztajer was detained as a Sonderkommando in the Treblinka extermination camp for ten months, from early October 1942 until 2 August 1943, when he managed to escape during the uprising. Sztajer was held in Treblinka II, known as the 'death camp', in the final months of his detention. In secret communications with Jankiel Wiernek, who was held in Treblinka I, Sztajer assisted in coordinating the uprising between the two camps.

Sztajer was among many survivors who volunteered to give evidence in the trial of John Demanjuk, a Ukrainian-American man accused of being the notorious Treblinka guard known as Ivan the Terrible. Sztajer claimed that during the uprising, he struck Ivan the Terrible on the back, causing him to fall over. Sztajer travelled to Jerusalem for the trial, however, he was eventually asked by the prosecution not to testify.

Sztajer is also known for his miniature model of the Treblinka camp, which is on display at the Melbourne Holocaust Museum in Melbourne, Australia.

== Early life ==
Sztajer was born on 15 July 1909 in Częstochowa, Poland to Wolf Yossif and Blima Sztajer. He had four brothers. As a child, Sztajer loved to play soccer, and he would often sneak out to play with a local team on Saturdays while his family observed Shabbat.

In 1920, Sztajer was conscripted into the Polish army, where he served only six months of his mandatory two years of conscripted duty after his father bribed officials for an early discharge.

Sztajer married Hela Majorczyk, a dressmaker from Wilno, on 10 July 1939. The couple had a daughter in 1940, whom they named Blima after Sztajer's mother.

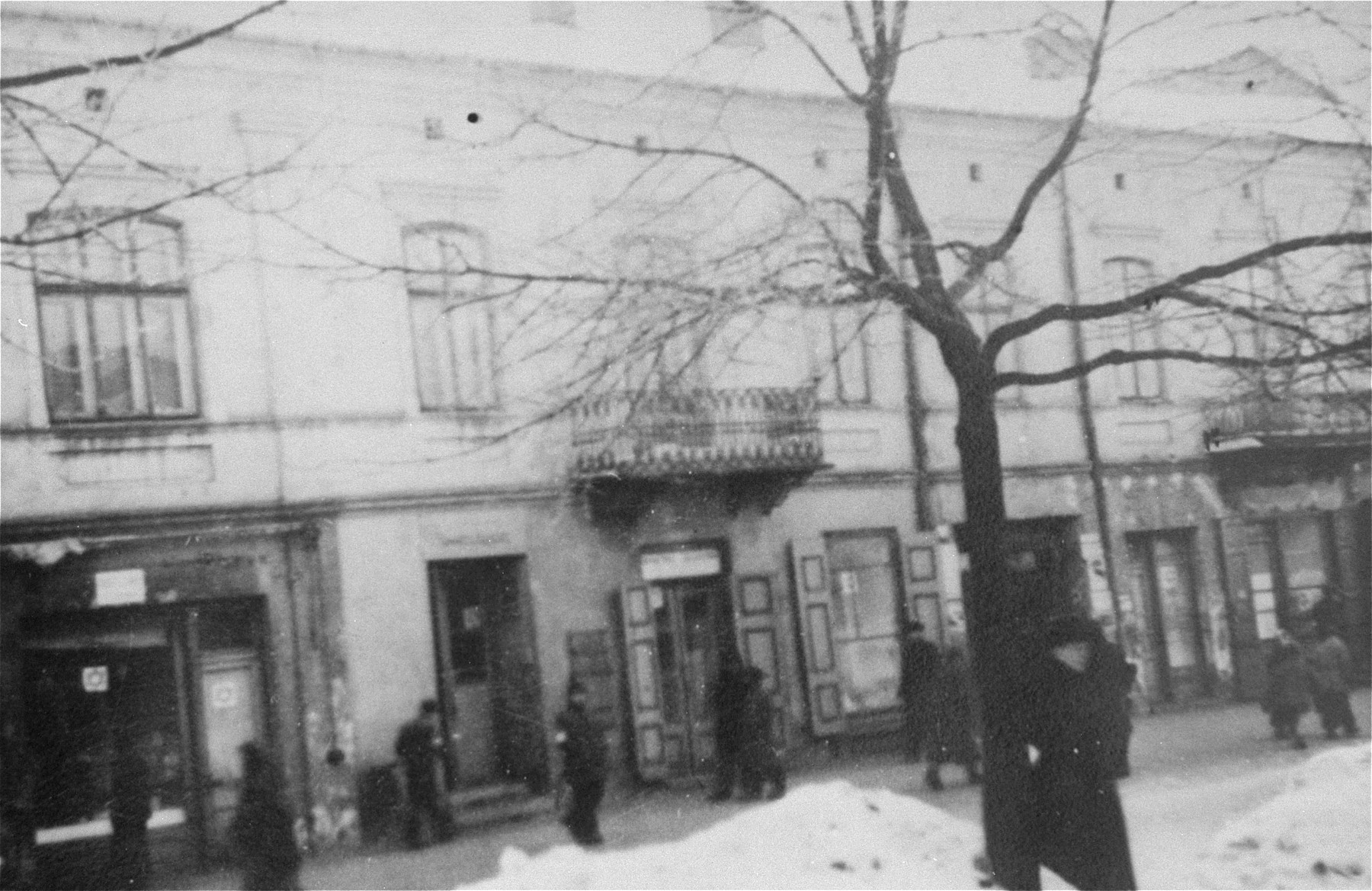
A photo of the Czestochowa ghetto where Sztajer was detained prior to being deported to the Treblinka extermination camp, circa 1942

On 3 September 1939, the city of Częstochowa was annexed by Nazi Germany. The Częstochowa Ghetto was established on 9 April 1941. When the ghetto was established, Sztajer's apartment fell within the perimeter of the ghetto, and he was not forced to relocate. The liquidation of the ghetto began on 22 September 1942 and Sztajer was deported with his wife and daughter to the Treblinka extermination camp on 3 October 1942.

== Treblinka extermination camp ==
=== Forced labour ===
Upon arrival at Treblinka Sztajer's wife, Hela, and their infant daughter Blima were immediately sent to the gas chamber, where they were killed. Sztajer, like others, believed the chamber was a shower and he had been ordered to remove his clothes and wait in line with his wife and daughter. The 'shower' was deemed full right after his wife stepped in, however, the notorious Treblinka officer Ivan the Terrible also grabbed Blima from Sztajer's arms and threw her into the chamber as the doors were closing.

Sztajer was pulled from the group awaiting the gas chambers after he was recognised by another prisoner, a former neighbour from Częstochowa who was working as a Sonderkommando, who told an SS guard that Sztajer was a good worker. He was immediately put to work sorting the clothes and possessions of the murdered victims. A few weeks later, he was sent to Treblinka II, where he was forced to carry the bodies of the murdered victims from the gas chambers and bury them in mass graves.

Later in his imprisonment, Sztajer and other prisoners were made to exhume the buried bodies and burn them, in order to destroy the evidence of the crimes at the camp. Sztajer was forced to remove the heads from the decaying bodies and hand them over to the Nazi guards, who wanted to count the skulls and find out how many people they had actually killed.

=== Uprising and escape ===
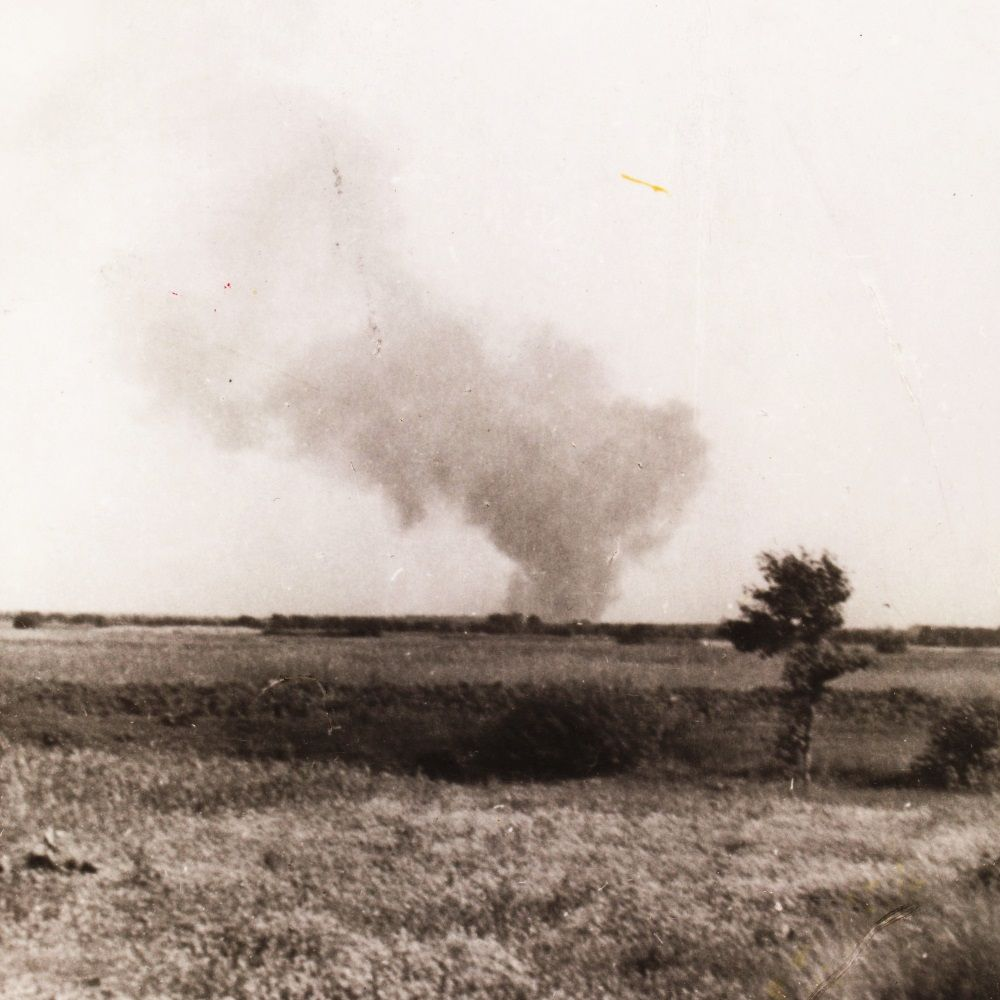
The Treblinka II perimeter burning during the 2 August 1943 prisoner uprising that Chaim Sztajer participated in. This photograph was taken by Franciszek Ząbecki.

In the lead up to the uprising, Sztajer exchanged secret communications with Jankiel Wiernek, who was detained in Treblinka I. Sztajer and the other organisers in Treblinka II were told to listen out for a gunshot in Treblinka I at 4:00 pm on 3 August 1943; however the shot rang out early after guards in Treblinka I caught two prisoners in possession of valuables. Some members of the group had stolen weapons from the guards' armoury, and others attacked guards with improvised weapons including shears and shovels.

Sztajer claimed that he personally hit Ivan the Terrible in the lower back with a spade, slicing his back open and knocking him over. A few minutes later, he returned to the spot to see that Ivan was gone.

While most prisoners were killed during the uprising, Sztajer was one of approximately 300 prisoners who managed to escape into the surrounding forests.

=== Survival in hiding ===
After his escape from Treblinka, Sztajer hid in the forest in Poland for almost twelve months until being liberated by the Soviet Red Army 1st Belorussian Front during the Lublin-Brest Offensive in July 1944. Sztajer survived hiding together with two other Jewish refugees, a man named Uryn Glatt and a fifteen-year-old boy named Joel Pandrik. Sztajer encountered the group in the forest near Treblinka not long after he escaped. The group crossed the Bug River together and hid in a burrow that they dug out under a tree. They often stole food to survive, and sometimes farmers and peasants would share small amounts of food with them.

== Post-war life ==
Sztajer married Chana Sztal in 1945, and together they had two children: Malka and Zev.

The family moved to Israel in April 1949, where Sztajer served in the Israel Defense Forces as a reserve soldier.

In 1955 the family moved to Melbourne, Australia, where they became naturalised citizens in December 1961. Chana died on 8 July 1971.

On 1 April 1973, Sztajer married Rosa Granek.

In 1982, he began constructing a miniature model of the Treblinka extermination camp. He constructed this model entirely from memory over the course of three and a half years, completing it in 1986. He donated the model to the Jewish Holocaust Centre, where it remains on display. Sztajer also volunteered at the museum as a survivor-guide.

In 1987, Sztajer travelled back to Israel to give evidence in the trial of John Demanjuk who was accused of being the notorious Treblinka Guard known as 'Ivan the Terrible'.

Sztajer died on 16 February 2008, at the age of 98.

== See also ==
- Ivan the Terrible (Treblinka guard)
- Jankiel Wiernik
- Jewish Holocaust Centre
- John Demjanjuk
- List of Holocaust survivors
- Samuel Willenberg
- Sonderaktion 1005
- Treblinka extermination camp
