= Hartkirchen =

- Municipality
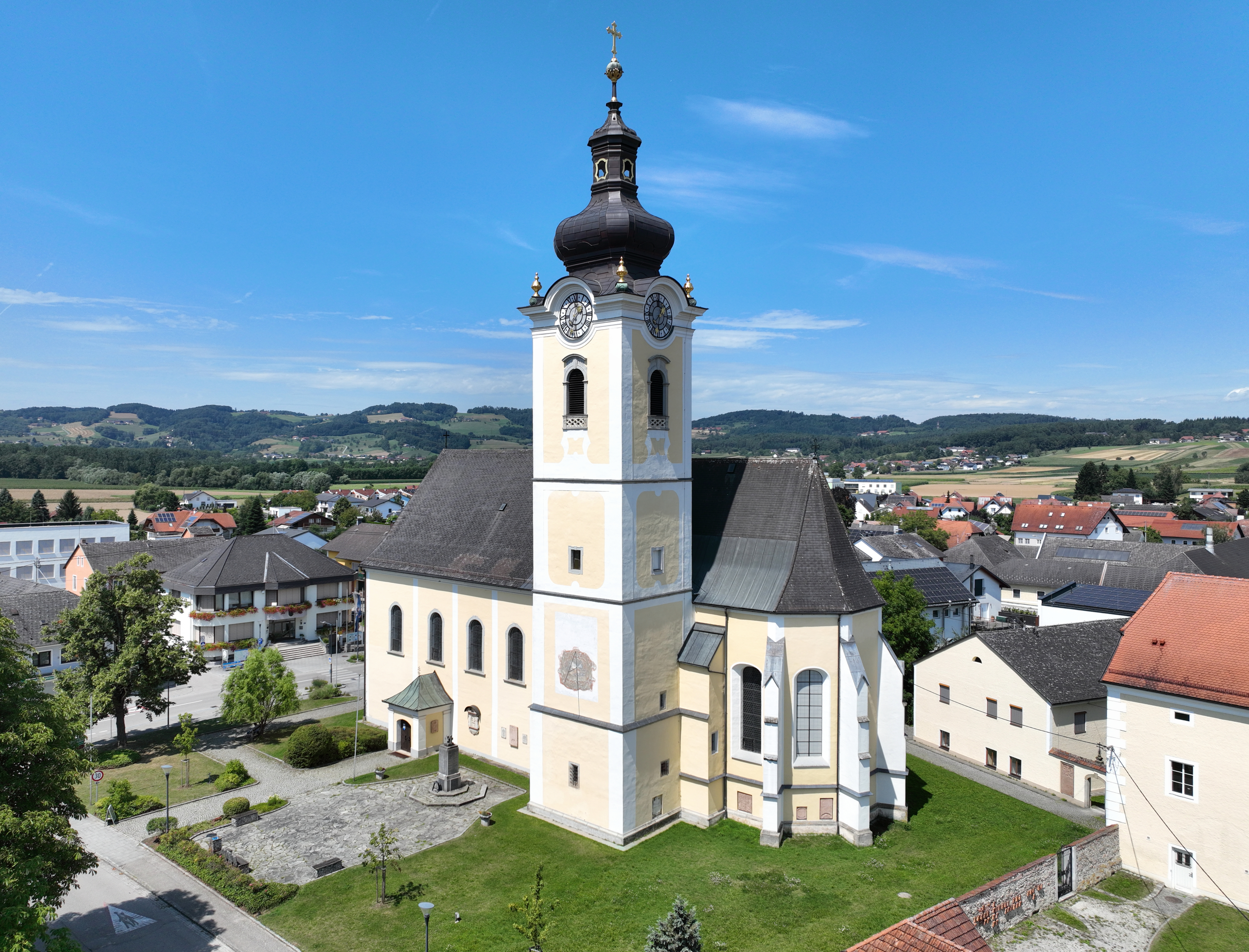
- Church of Saint Stephen

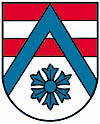
- Coat of arms

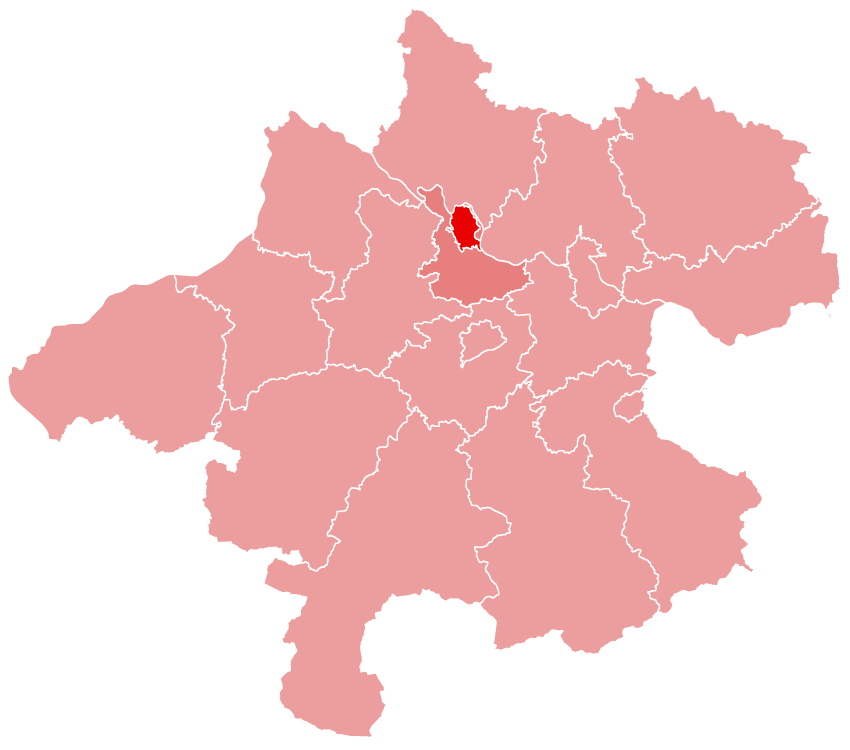
- Location within Upper Austria

- Location within Austria
- Coordinates: 48°21′50″N 14°00′10″E
- Country: Austria
- State: Upper Austria
- District: Eferding

Government
  - Mayor: Wolfram Moshammer (SPÖ)

Area
  - Total: 39.08 km^{2} (15.09 sq mi)
- Elevation: 273 m (896 ft)

Population (2018-01-01)
  - Total: 4,099
  - Density: 104.9/km^{2} (271.7/sq mi)
- Time zone: UTC+1 (CET)
  - Summer (DST): UTC+2 (CEST)
- Postal code: 4081
- Area code: 07273
- Vehicle registration: EF
- Website: www.hartkirchen.ooe.gv.at

Hartkirchen is a municipality in the district of Eferding in the Austrian state of Upper Austria.

== Geography ==
Hartkirchen lies in the Hausruckviertel. About 27 percent of the municipality is forest and 60 percent farmland.
