= Aschach an der Donau =

- Municipality
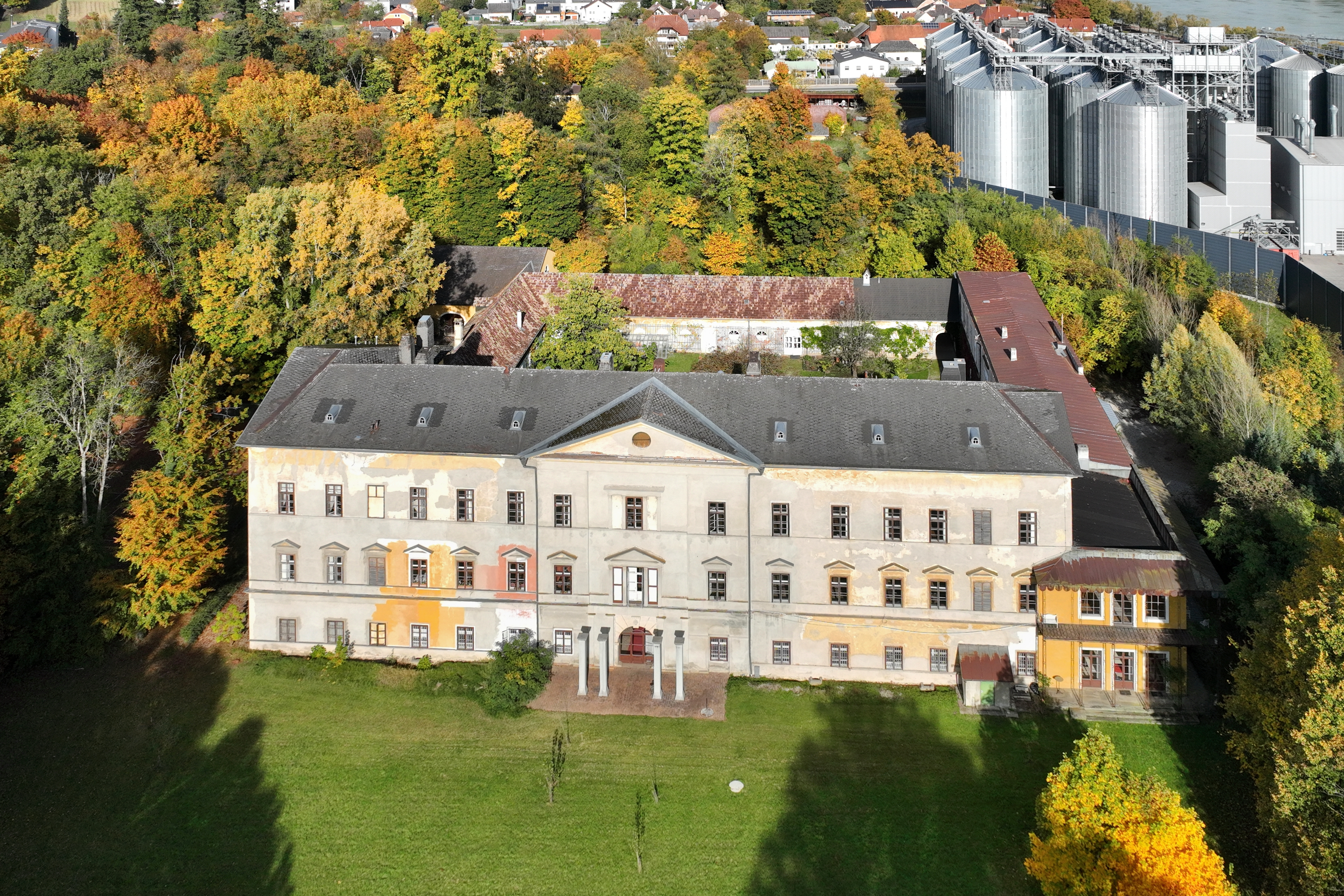

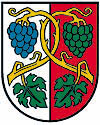
- Coat of arms

- Location within Austria
- Coordinates: 48°22′0″N 14°01′0″E
- Country: Austria
- State: Upper Austria
- District: Eferding

Government
  - Mayor: Friedrich Knierzinger (ÖVP)

Area
  - Total: 6.02 km^{2} (2.32 sq mi)
- Elevation: 268 m (879 ft)

Population (2018-01-01)
  - Total: 2,201
  - Density: 366/km^{2} (947/sq mi)
- Time zone: UTC+1 (CET)
  - Summer (DST): UTC+2 (CEST)
- Postal code: 4082
- Area code: 07273
- Vehicle registration: EF
- Website: www.aschach.at

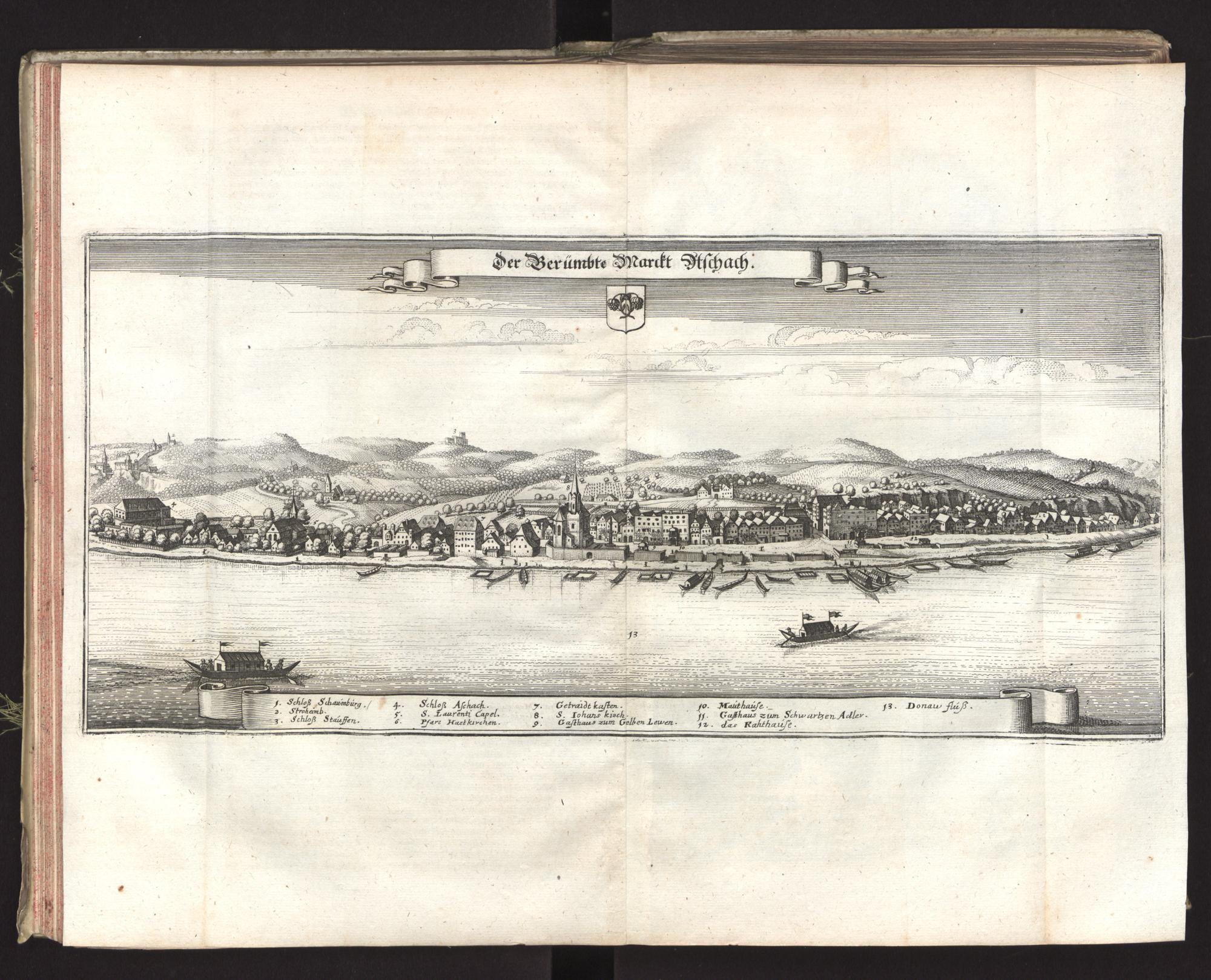
Aschach an der Donau in 1679

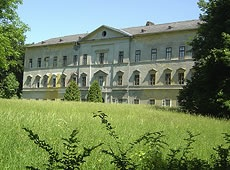
Schloss

Aschach an der Donau is a municipality in the district Eferding in the Austrian state of Upper Austria.

== Geography ==
Aschach lies in the Danube Valley, on the edge of the Eferding Basin in the Hausruckviertel. About 2 percent of the area is forested.

Subdivisions are: Aschach an der Donau (center), Ruprechting, and Sommerberg.

== Coat of arms ==
Silver and red, covered by two natural colored, twisted grapevines with a blue grape to the left, a green grape to the right and a green leaf in each half.

The colors of the banner are red, white and green. The motif indicates due to climatic advantages in the early Middle Ages operated winery, which was mentioned in the Stiftbrief for Kremsmünster in the year 777 and was maintained in the area around Aschach in some vineyards until after 1870. White-red are the colors of the banner of arms of the Counts of Schauberg, who until 1559 held government and a major toll in Aschach.

== History ==
First mentioned in the year 777 at the founding of the monastery Kremsmünster, Aschach was originally part of the eastern part of the Duchy of Bavaria and belonged to the Duchy of Austria up to the 12th Century.

1490 Aschach was attributed to the Principality of Österreich ob der Enns, and received the market rights and Coat of arms in 1512 by Emperor Maximilian. During the Napoleonic Wars the town was occupied several times. Since 1918, the town belongs to the state of Upper Austria. After the annexation of Austria to the German Reich March 13, 1938 the town belonged to Gau Oberdonau. After 1945 followed the restoration of Upper Austria.

=== Celts and Romans in Aschach ===
The Celtic name Joviacum appeared first on the Itinerarium Antoninianum at the time when the Roman Emperor Marcus Aurelius Antoninus, nicknamed Caracalla, reigned from 211-217.

1838 during excavations in Schlögen extensive wall remains of a Roman fort were found. Therefore, by the middle of this century it was assumed that Schlögen was Joviacum as referred to in the Directory of Roman legions. After excavations in the years 1957-1959 by Dr. Lothar Eckhart proved: Schlögen cannot be Joviacum. Eckhart associates the Militum Liburnariorum, a sort of Marines of the Italian Legion, with Aschach, the mounted military units Ad Mauros with Eferding. Other than strategic reasons speak for that Aschach is Joviacum the St. Laurentius-patronage of the chapel at the cemetery, the evidence of a Roman square floor plan and the finding of street pavement stones and cart ruts (Limes road?) In the Abelstraße.

Since Aschach is Joviacum, this brings us into the closest connection with the most amazing sources of departing Antiquity with the "Life of St. Serverin" of the abbot Eugippius. St. Severin appeared in Noricum, a time when the Roman rule came to an end. As a monk and miracle worker, he resisted the Germanic princes, who were sitting with their tribes on both sides of the Danube. In the deserted Roman settlements, he persuaded the defenseless poor Roman people to a Christian lifestyle. When the circumstances had become untenable, he predicted them the imminent defeat of their place and ordered the evacuation of the area. So also for Aschach (Joviacum). We read in the Vita Sancti Severini Eugippii:

"... the servant of God sent the church singer Moderatus to the inhabitants of a city called Joviacum which was more than 20 miles away from Batavis, who should ask there an immediate escape from the vulnerable city. Also here the well-meant advice was not heard so that the saint sent off a courier again, who should at least prompt the church leader Maximianus of Joviacum to leave the village. When also this messenger was not believed, he left the city quickly. Still in the same night the Heruli invaded Joviacum, destroyed the settlement and led most of the inhabitants into slavery. The priest they hung on the gallows."

The details of the Vita is deemed reliable, earlier doubts are resolved by more recent research. Thus, under stipulation of the assumption of the accuracy that Aschach is Joviacum it is testified that the Late Antiquity martyr is MAXIMIANUS of Aschach.

== Population ==
Historical population
Year	Pop.	±%
1869	1,643	—
1880	1,684	+2.5%
1890	1,661	−1.4%
1900	1,598	−3.8%
1910	1,756	+9.9%
1923	1,669	−5.0%
1934	1,599	−4.2%
1939	1,666	+4.2%
1951	2,205	+32.4%
1961	2,039	−7.5%
1971	2,310	+13.3%
1981	2,162	−6.4%
1991	2,140	−1.0%
2001	2,151	+0.5%
2011	2,188	+1.7%
2017	2,195	+0.3%

== Politics ==
=== Municipal Council ===
The following parties are represented in the council:

- SPÖ (5 seats)
- ÖVP (11 seats)
- FPÖ (6 seats)
- The Greens (3 seats)

=== Mayor ===
Incumbent Mayor is Friedrich Knierzinger (ÖVP).

- Mayors since 1849

Name	seit
Guglmayr Georg	1. January 1849
Heller Friedrich	1. January 1852
Krigner Franz	1. January 1855
Kurzwernhart Theodor	1. März 1861
Schober Stephan	2. August 1864
Fischer Johann Georg	31. August 1867
Stampfl Gottlieb	29. Juli 1870
Kurzwernhart Theodor	29. January 1873
Fischer Johann Georg	1. January 1886
Markl Emmerich	1. January 1887
Hager Adam	4. February 1889
Haidenthaler Leopold	23. February 1895
Madlsperger Georg	1. January 1908
Obgrasser Ignaz	1. January 1913
Parsche Rudolf	29. August 1919
Ettl Josef	1. Januar 1920
Dienstl Hans Dr.	31. Mai 1924
Osterkorn Hans	1. January 1928
Wagner Karl	1. January 1938
Spielberger Karl	1. January 1938
Reinhold Hans	1. January 1941
Heger Hans	1. January 1945
Dienstl Hans Dr.	25. November 1945
Astner Alois	1. January 1946
Hinterberger Johann	9. October 1949
Wagner Karl	23. October 1955
Fiala Josef	1. January 1964
Veicht Johann	22. October 1967
Putz Adolf	1. January 1984
Achleitner Rudolf	12. October 2003
Friedrich Knierzinger	11. October 2009

== Sister City ==
- The Official Sister City is Obernzell in Bavaria, Germany

== Landmarks ==
- Aschach has a historic center with town houses dating from the Middle Ages, with beautiful facades and courtyards from the Gothic, Baroque and Renaissance.
- Parish Church 'Danube Cross': around 1490 follows the Late-Gothic succeeding building of an originally in 1371 first mentioned church on records. The high altar is crowned by the healing powers of the revered Danube cross. It was brought ashore in 1693 by two sailors in a flood. The sickly restorer of the cross was healed during his work. 1784, Aschach was separated by a government decree of Emperor Joseph II from the mother-church Hartkirchen and elevated to an independent parish. 1976, the church was renovated and expanded, designed by Clemens Holzmeister.
- Old Town Hall
- Schloss Aschach': The manor house is the former seat of the Counts of Harrach. The main wing of the manor house from the 16th Century has arcades in the courtyard on all three floors. The east wing was built in 1709 by Johann Lucas von Hildebrandt, as well as the altar in the chapel. The castle is privately owned.
- Kraftwerk Aschach: The hydro power plant was built 1959-1964 and was once Europe's largest hydro power plant.
- Schopper and Fishery museum. The museum presents the history of the Market Aschach in connection with the shipbuilding - and shipping tradition on the Upper Danube. The Schopper museum presents the historic craft of shipbuilding and also the social and cultural environment of these craftsmen's guilds. In addition, the last original Zehner Trauner is displayed. The Fisheries Museum shows the development of commercial and recreational fishery in Upper Austria with special reference to the upper Danube.

== Transport ==
In addition to the Danube, the main traffic route for thousands of years, in 1886 Aschach was connected by the Aschacher Bahn (Aschach - Eferding - Wels) to the modern transportation system.

During the power plant construction the railway was extended through Aschach to the power plant (then dismantled).

In 1962 the ferry ("Flying Bridge") was replaced by the bridge farther down the river and thus the region Mühlviertel and the central region connected to one another.

Bus lines operate scheduled bus service between neighboring cities among which are Wels, Linz, and Passau in Bavaria.

== Education ==
- Kindergarten
- Elementary School
- Middle School

== Bibliography ==
- Ernst Neweklowsky: Aschach und die Donauschiffahrt. In: Oberösterreichische Heimatblätter 13 (195993), S. 207-242. (Digitalisat)
