= Alkoven =

- Municipality
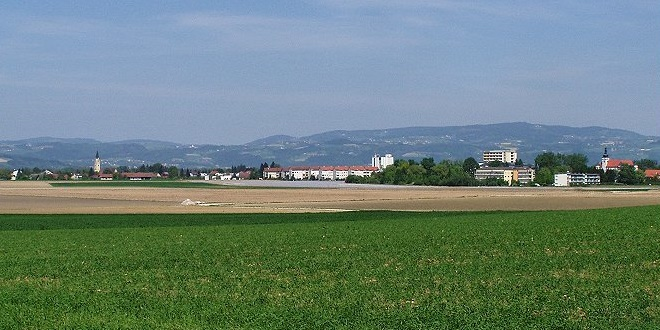

- Coat of arms

- Location within Austria
- Coordinates: 48°17′14″N 14°06′25″E
- Country: Austria
- State: Upper Austria
- District: Eferding

Government
  - Mayor: Monika Weberberger-Rainer (SPÖ)

Area
  - Total: 42.58 km^{2} (16.44 sq mi)
- Elevation: 268 m (879 ft)

Population (2018-01-01)
  - Total: 5,961
  - Density: 140.0/km^{2} (362.6/sq mi)
- Time zone: UTC+1 (CET)
  - Summer (DST): UTC+2 (CEST)
- Postal code: 4072
- Area code: 07274
- Vehicle registration: EF
- Website: www.alkoven.at

Alkoven is a municipality in the district of Eferding in the Austrian state of Upper Austria.

== Geography ==
Alkoven lies in the Hausruckviertel. About 17 percent of the municipality is forest and 65 percent farmland.

== History ==
The Renaissance style Hartheim Castle is located at Alkoven. It became notorious as one of the Nazi Euthanasia killing centers, where the killing program Action T4 took place (see Hartheim Euthanasia Centre).

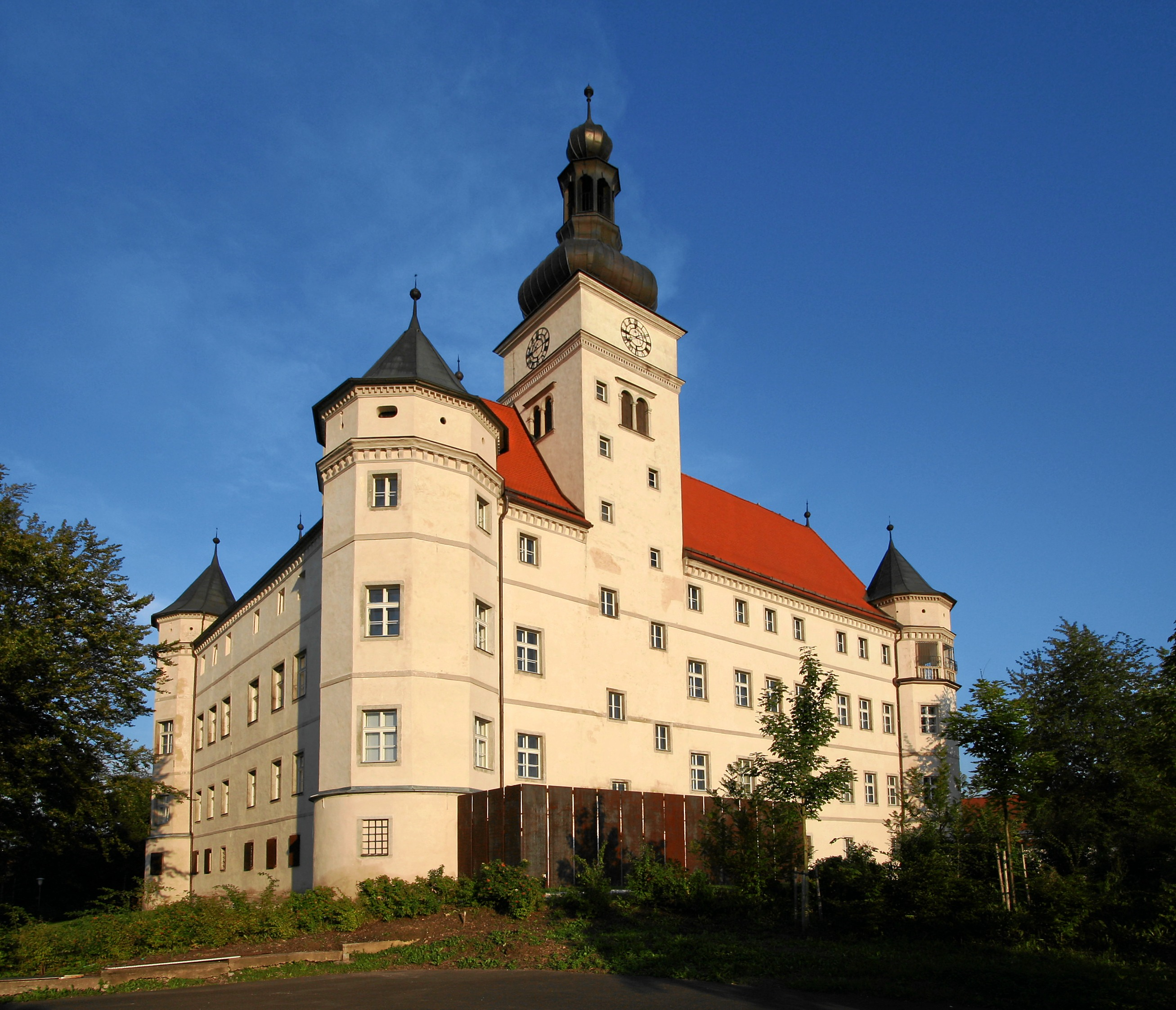
Hartheim Castle

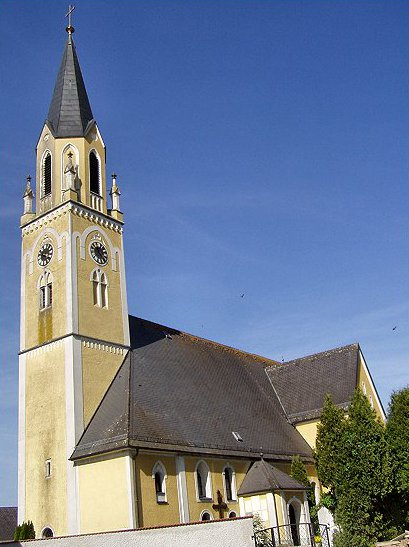
Church of Alkoven
