= Eferding =

- Municipality
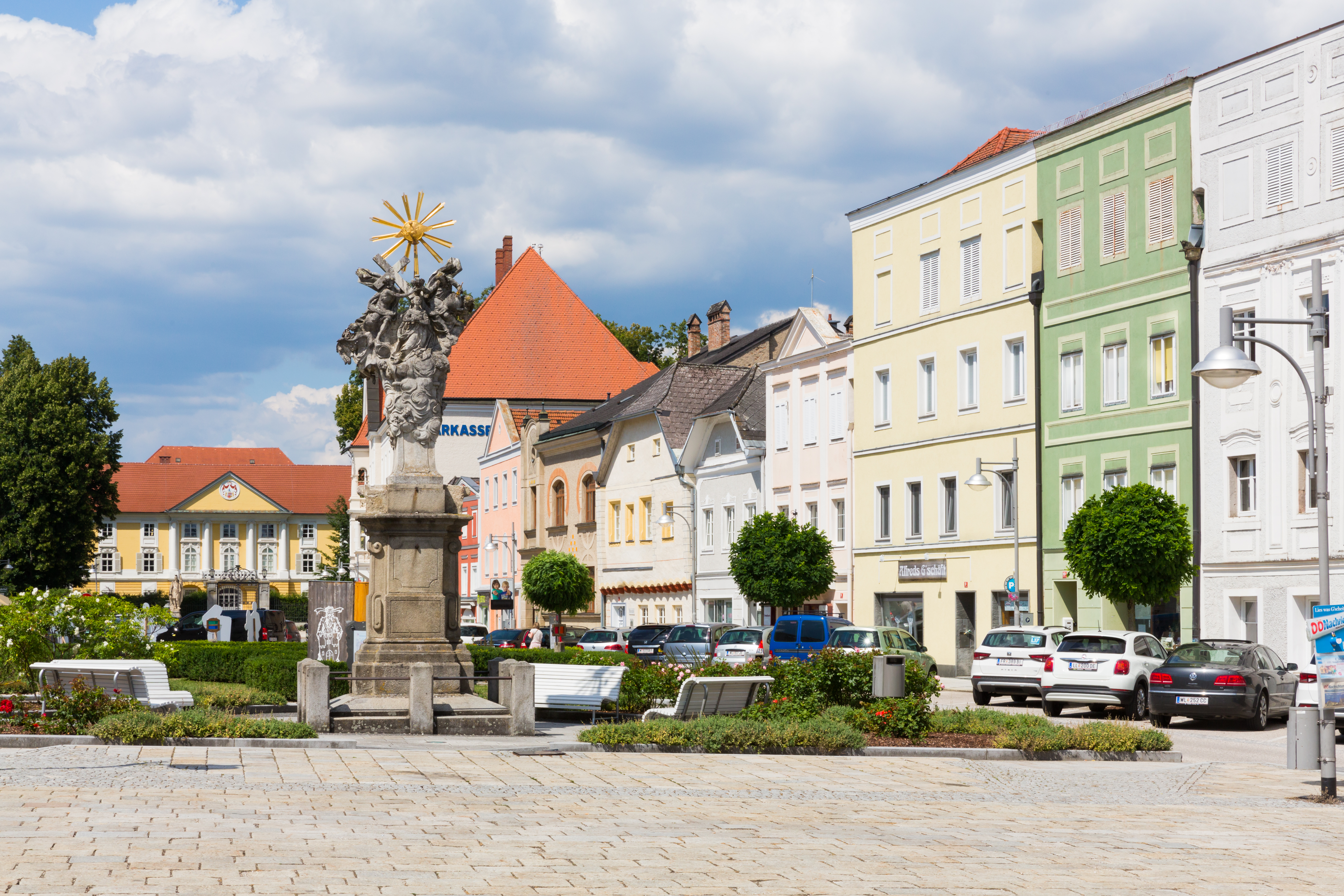

- Coat of arms

- Location within Austria Eferding (Austria)
- Coordinates: 48°19′N 14°02′E
- Country: Austria
- State: Upper Austria
- District: Eferding

Government
  - Mayor: Christian Penn (SPÖ)

Area
  - Total: 2.81 km^{2} (1.08 sq mi)
- Elevation: 271 m (889 ft)

Population (2018-01-01)
  - Total: 4,100
  - Density: 1,500/km^{2} (3,800/sq mi)
- Time zone: UTC+1 (CET)
  - Summer (DST): UTC+2 (CEST)
- Postal code: 4070
- Area code: 07272
- Vehicle registration: EF
- Website: www.eferding.at

Eferding (German pronunciation: [ˈeːfɐdɪŋ]) is the capital of the Eferding district in the Austrian state of Upper Austria.

== Geography ==
Eferding is the center of the Eferding basin. The city is 2 km away from the Danube River, in Upper Austria.

== History ==
Eferding was appointed as a city in 1222. It is the third oldest city in Austria.

== Population ==
Historical population
Year	Pop.	±%
1869	2,216	—
1880	2,119	−4.4%
1890	2,155	+1.7%
1900	2,077	−3.6%
1910	2,274	+9.5%
1923	2,326	+2.3%
1934	2,503	+7.6%
1939	2,619	+4.6%
1951	3,465	+32.3%
1961	3,151	−9.1%
1971	3,023	−4.1%
1981	3,111	+2.9%
1991	3,152	+1.3%
2001	3,393	+7.6%
2011	3,768	+11.1%

== Twin cities ==
- Passau, Germany

== Sights ==
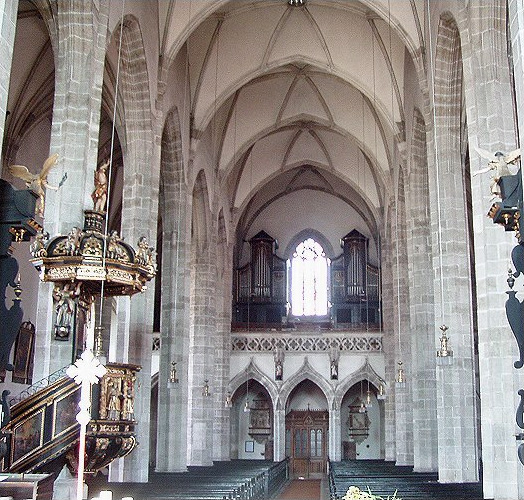
Church of Eferding (inside)

- Cathedral Eferding: (Stadtpfarrkirche Eferding) late gothic, built in 1451–1505, because of its size it is also called 'Dom of Eferding'
- Main Square: the Main Square is an old big square with gothic and baroque houses, at the north side of the main square there is a castle, the castle Starhemberg.
- Castle Starhemberg: (Schloss Starhemberg) built in the 13th century. It is home to two museums: the Fürstlich Starhembergische Familienmuseum (History of the Starhembergs) and the Museum of the city of Eferding. The museum displays the table of the Viennese apartment of Wolfgang Amadeus Mozart where he composed the opera The Magic Flute (Die Zauberflöte). A "Christmas Market" is celebrated every winter in the castle courtyard. The descendants of the House of Starhemberg continue to reside in the castle. The castle is located between the north side of the main place, the cathedral at the graben of the former city wall.

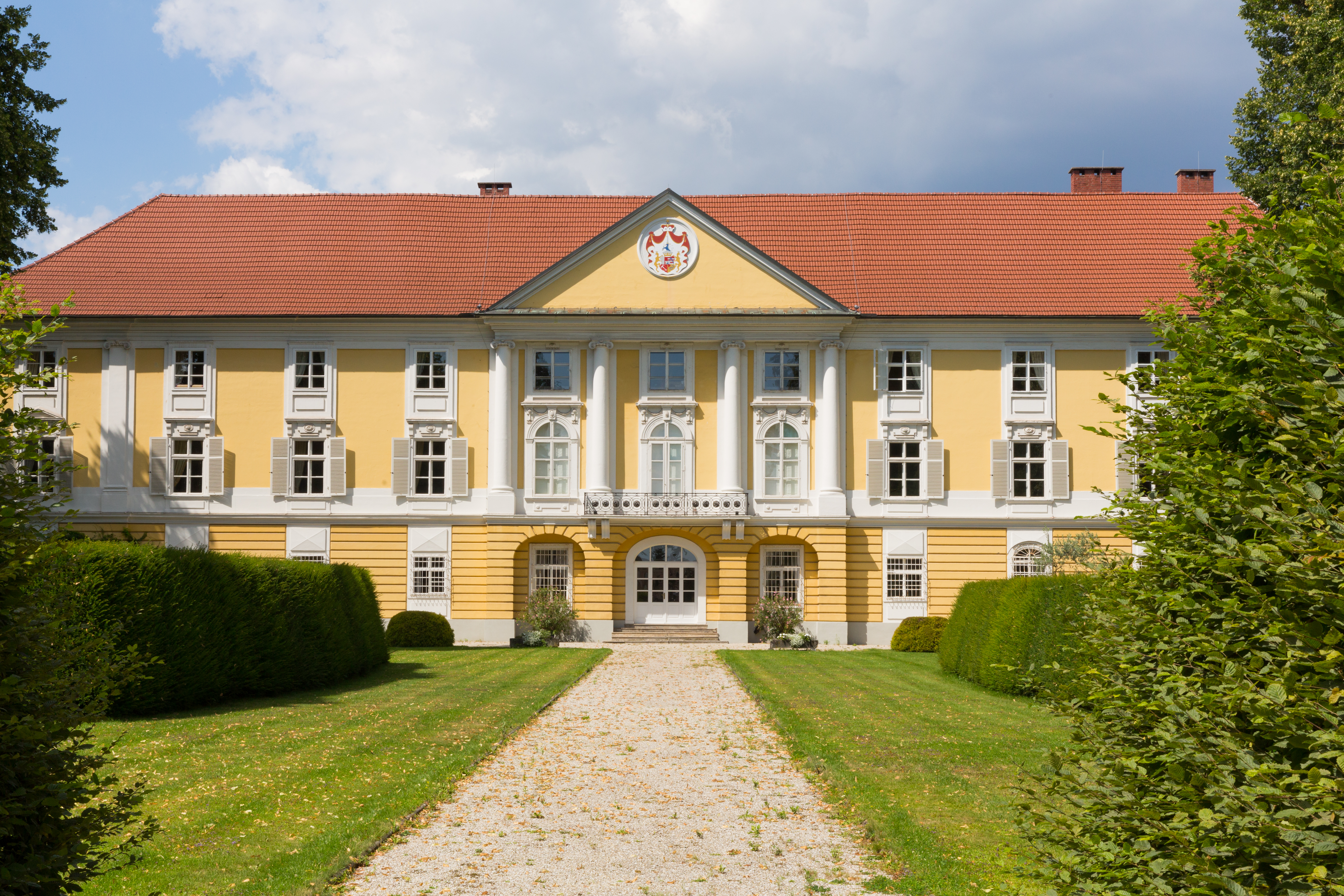
Castle Starhemberg

== Traffic ==
- Danube cycle way: In Austria the Danube cycle path goes from Passau - Aschach - Eferding - Linz - Vienna to the border to Hungary. Eferding is twenty kilometers before Linz, and it is two kilometers away from the Danube and the Danube cycle path.
- Shipping pier: there is a Danube shipping pier in the small village of 'Brandstatt', 2 km away from the town of Eferding
- train and bus from and to Linz and bus from and to Wels

== Sport ==
- Ponds: there are some nice small ponds (lakes) located in the area between the Danube und the city Eferding, used for swimming in summer by free entry
- outdoor swimming pool: close to the center there is a new outdoor swimming pool (Landscaped Pool)
- horseback-riding: there are possibilities for horseback-riding

== Notable people ==
- Johann Nepomuk David (1895–1977), Austrian composer
- August Kubizek (1888–1956), Austrian conductor and childhood friend of Adolf Hitler
