= Haibach ob der Donau =

- Municipality
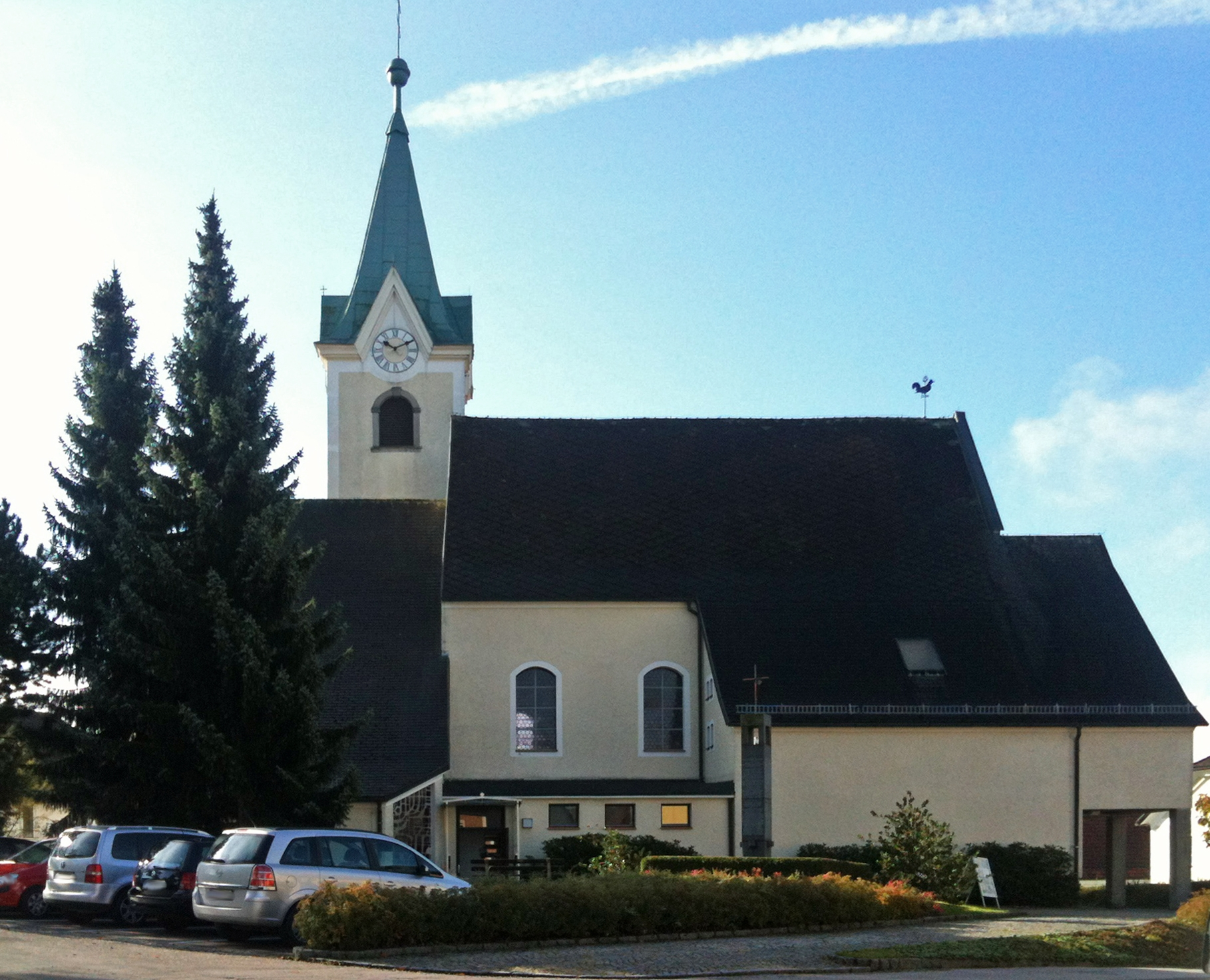

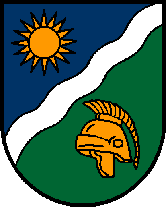
- Coat of arms

- Location within Austria
- Coordinates: 48°25′0″N 13°55′0″E
- Country: Austria
- State: Upper Austria
- District: Eferding

Government
  - Mayor: Josef Ecker (ÖVP)

Area
  - Total: 25.53 km^{2} (9.86 sq mi)
- Elevation: 528 m (1,732 ft)

Population (2018-01-01)
  - Total: 1,308
  - Density: 51.23/km^{2} (132.7/sq mi)
- Time zone: UTC+1 (CET)
  - Summer (DST): UTC+2 (CEST)
- Postal code: 4083
- Area code: 07279
- Vehicle registration: EF
- Website: www.haibach-donau.at

Haibach ob der Donau is a municipality in the district of Eferding in the Austrian state of Upper Austria, Austria. It is situated near the Danube.

== Geography ==
Haibach lies in the Hausruckviertel. About 45 percent of the municipality is forest and 41 percent farmland.
