= List of spa towns =

The list of spa towns lists national lists and various relevant spa towns around the world.

== In Africa ==
=== Ethiopia ===
- Afar Region
- Guder
- Sodere
- Ambo

=== Madagascar ===
- Antsirabe

=== Morocco ===
- Moulay Yacoub

=== South Africa ===
- Caledon
- Tshipise
- Badplaas
- Bela Bela

== In the Americas ==
=== Argentina ===
- Termas de Río Hondo, Santiago del Estero Province
- Fiambalá, Catamarca Province

=== Brazil ===
- Águas da Prata (São Paulo)
- Águas de Chapecó (Santa Catarina)
- Águas de Lindoia (São Paulo)
- Águas de Santa Bárbara (São Paulo)
- Águas de São Pedro (São Paulo)
- Águas Mornas (Santa Catarina)
- Araxá (Minas Gerais)
- Caldas da Imperatriz (Santa Catarina)
- Caldas Novas (Goiás)
- Caxambu (Minas Gerais)
- Piratuba (Santa Catarina)
- Poços de Caldas (Minas Gerais)
- São Lourenço (Minas Gerais)
- Socorro (São Paulo)

=== Cuba ===
- Arriete-Ciego Montero

=== Ecuador ===
- Baños de Agua Santa, Tungurahua Province

=== El Salvador ===
- Agua Caliente

=== Canada ===
==== Alberta ====
- Banff Upper Hot Springs
- Miette Hot Springs

==== British Columbia ====
- Harrison Hot Springs
- Radium Hot Springs
- Fairmont Hot Springs
- Halcyon Hot Springs
- Ainsworth Hot Springs
- Nakusp Hot Springs
- Canyon Hot Springs
- Lussier Hot Springs
- Ram Creek Hot Springs
- Dewar Creek Hot Springs
- Meager Creek Hot Spring
- Skookumchuck Hot Springs/St. Agnes Well Hot Springs
- Liard River Hot Springs
- Mount Layton Hot Springs
- Iskut River Hot Springs
- Hotspring Island, Haida Gwaii
- Hot Springs Cove, Vancouver Island
- Ahousat Hot Springs

==== Ontario ====
- Carlsbad Springs
- Caledonia Springs

=== United States ===
- Eureka Springs, Arkansas
- Hot Springs, Arkansas
- Calistoga, California
- Desert Hot Springs, California
- Palm Springs, California
- Paso Robles, California
- Tecopa, California
- Glenwood Springs, Colorado
- Idaho Springs, Colorado
- Manitou Springs, Colorado
- Ouray, Colorado
- Pagosa Springs, Colorado
- Warm Springs, Georgia
- Lava Hot Springs, Idaho
- French Lick, Indiana
- Mount Clemens, Michigan
- Excelsior Springs, Missouri
- Hot Springs, Montana
- Ojo Caliente, New Mexico
- Truth or Consequences, New Mexico
- Massena, New York
- Saratoga Springs, New York
- Hot Springs, North Carolina
- Yellow Springs, Ohio
- Bedford, Pennsylvania
- Cambridge Springs, Pennsylvania
- Hot Springs, South Dakota
- Estill Springs, Tennessee
- Hot Springs, Virginia
- Berkeley Springs, West Virginia
- White Sulphur Springs, West Virginia
- Thermopolis, Wyoming

=== Costa Rica ===
- Rincon de la Vieja Volcano National Park
- Tabacón

=== Jamaica ===
- Milk River Mineral Bath

=== Mexico ===
- Agua Hedionda Spa
- Puertecitos

=== Peru ===
- Monterrey, Ancash
- Chivay, Arequipa
- Socosani, Arequipa
- Baños del Inca, Cajamarca
- Aguas Calientes, Cuzco

=== Uruguay ===
- Termas del Arapey
- Termas del Daymán
- Termas de Guaviyú
- Termas de San Nicanor
- Termas de Almirón

== In Asia ==
=== China ===
- Anshan, Liaoning
- Tianjin

=== India ===
- Trivandrum
- Varkala
- Kovalam
- Poovar

=== Indonesia ===
- Bali
- Batam

=== Israel ===
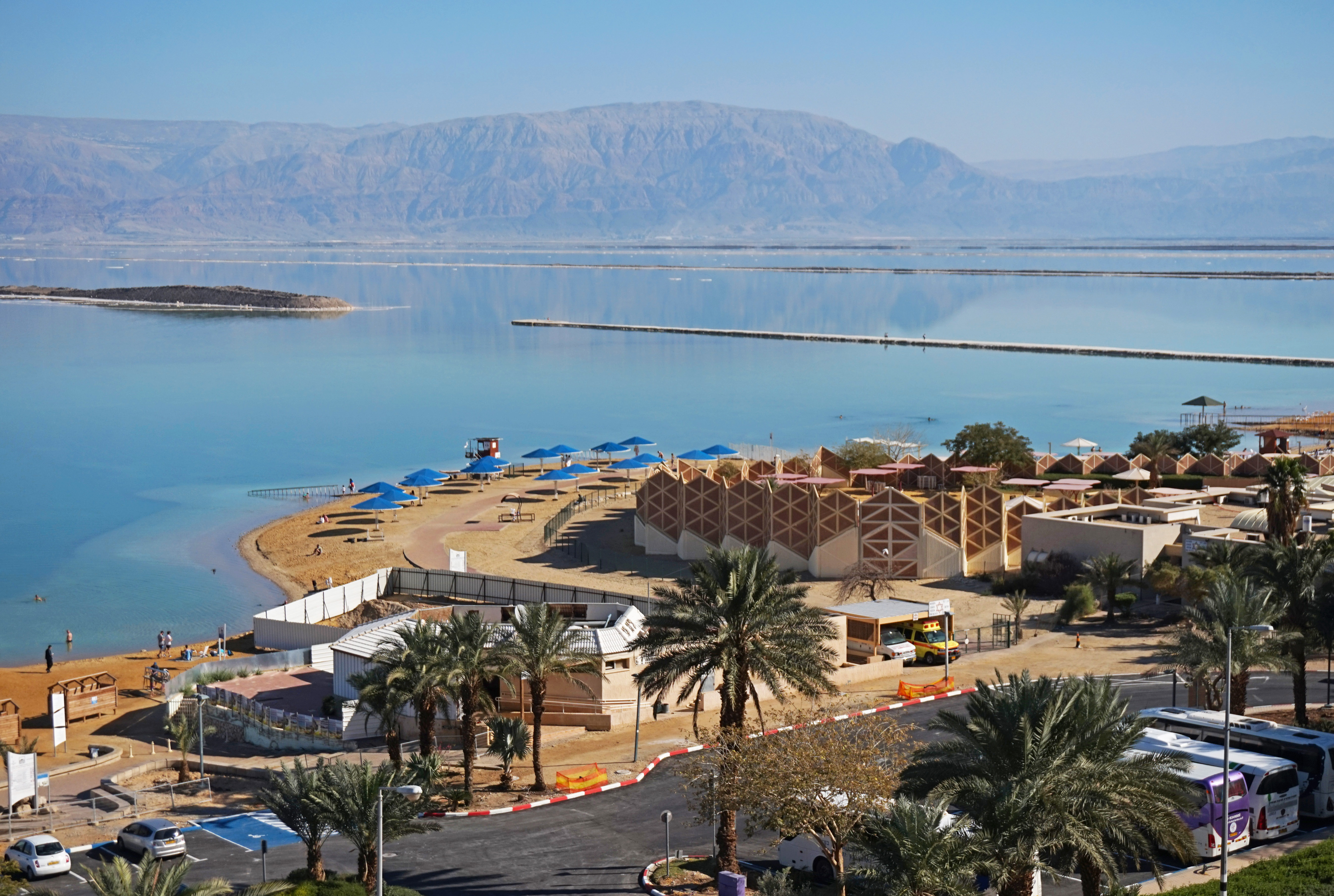
Ein Bokek

- Dead Sea
- Eilat
- Ein Bokek
- Neve Zohar
- Tiberias

=== Japan ===
"hot spring" is "Onsen" in Japanese

- Beppu, Ōita
- Hakone, Kanagawa
- Gero, Gifu
- Kobe, Kita-ku
- Kusatsu, Gunma
- Matsuyama, Ehime
- Nagoya
- Noboribetsu, Hokkaidō
- Kinugawa, Nikkō
- Takarazuka, Hyōgo
- Yufuin, Oita

=== Malaysia ===
- Poring, Sabah

=== Philippines ===
- Calamba, Laguna
- Los Baños, Laguna

=== South Korea ===
- Chungju, Chungcheongbuk-do
- Dongnae-gu, Busan
- Gwangju, South Jeolla
- Gyeongju, Gyeongsangbuk-do
- Jeongeup, North Jeolla
- Jungwon-gu, Gyeonggi-do
- Mungyeong, Gyeongsangbuk-do
- Onyang, Chungbuk
- Pocheon, Gyeonggi
- Seoul
- Sokcho, Gangwon
- Yuseong-gu, Daejeon

=== Taiwan ===
- Chiao Hsi
- Dakeng
- Beitou
- Jhiben
- Yangmingshan
- Guanziling
- Wulai
- Green island — undersea spas

=== Vietnam ===
- Ba Vi, Hanoi
- Bang Spa, Quang Binh
- Binh Chau, Ba Ria
- Kim Boi, Hoa Binh
- Vinh Hao, Binh Thuan
- Tan My, Ninh Thuan
- Nha Trang

== In Eurasia ==
=== Armenia ===
- Arzni
- Bjni
- Dilijan
- Jermuk
- Tsaghkadzor

=== Azerbaijan ===
- Bilgah
- Istisu
- Naftalan
- Shikhovo

=== Cyprus ===
- Ayia Napa
- Larnaca
- Limassol
- Nicosia
- Paphos

=== Georgia ===
- Borjomi
- Bakhmaro
- Sairme
- Tskaltubo

=== Russia ===
- Dagomys
- Kislovodsk
- Mineralnye Vody
- Pyatigorsk
- Zheleznovodsk
- Nalchik
- Belokurikha
- Soligalich
- Sochi
- Staraya Russa
- Yessentuki
- Zelenogradsk
- Marcial
- Vladikavkaz
- Inozemtsevo

==== Crimea ====
- Alupka
- Alushta
- Yevpatoria
- Feodosiya
- Foros
- Gaspra
- Kerch
- Koreiz
- Livadia
- Miskhor
- Partenit
- Simeiz
- Sudak
- Yalta

=== Turkey ===
- Ayder
- Afyon
- Çamlıhemşin
- Çeşme
- Denizli
- Gönen
- Kangal
- Köyceğiz
- Pamukkale
- Sivas
- Yalova

=== Tajikistan ===
- Obi garm
- Zumrad

== In Europe ==
=== Andorra ===
- Les Escaldes, parish of Escaldes-Engordany

=== Austria ===
- Bad Aussee
- Bad Bleiberg
- Bad Blumau
- Bad Erlach - Linsberg Asia
- Bad Fischau-Brunn - Kristalltherme Bad Fischau
- Bad Gastein - Felsentherme Gastein / Alpen Therme Gastein
- Bad Geinberg
- Bad Gleichenberg
- Bad Hall - Tassilo Therme Bad Hall
- Bad Ischl - Kaiser Therme Bad Ischl
- Bad Kleinkirchheim - Thermal Römerbad / Therme St. Kathrein
- Bad Kreuzen
- Bad Lutzmannsburg - Sonnentherme Lutzmannsburg
- Bad Radkersburg
- Bad Sauerbrunn - Heiltherme Bad Sauerbrunn
- Bad Schallerbach - Eurotherme Bad Schallerbach
- Bad Tatzmannsdorf - Burgenlandtherme Bad Tatzmannsdorf
- Bad Vigaun - St. Barbara Therme Bad Vigaun
- Bad Vöslau - Thermalbad Bad Vöslau
- Bad Waltersdorf
- Baden bei Wien - Römertherme Baden
- Fohnsdorf - Aqualux Therme Fohnsdorf
- Köflach - Therme NOVA
- Laa an der Thaya - Therme Laa
- Längenfeld - Therme Aqua Dome Längenfeld
- Loipersdorf
- Moorbad Gmös
- Sebersdorf - H2O Therme
- Stegersbach
- Villach - ThermenResort Warmbad-Villach
- Wien Oberlaa

=== Belgium ===
- Spa
- Chaudfontaine
- Ostend

=== Bosnia and Herzegovina ===
- Banja Slatina, Slatina
- Banja Vrućica, Teslić
- Sarajevo
- Medjugorje
- Mostar
- Dvorovi
- Srebrenica

=== Croatia ===
- Bizovačke toplice, Bizovac
- Crikvenica
- Daruvarske toplice, Daruvar
- Duga Uvala
- Istarske toplice (Terme Istriane)
- Terme Jezerčica, Donja Stubica
- "Naftalan", Ivanić-Grad
- Krapinske Toplice, Krapina
- Lipik
- Makarska
- Selce
- Šibenik
- Sisak
- Stubičke Toplice
- Sutinske Toplice, Mače, Croatia
- Toplice Topusko, Topusko
- Tuheljske toplice, Tuhelj
- Toplice Sveti Martin (Vučkovec) - Sveti Martin na Muri
- Topusko
- Varaždinske Toplice, Varaždin
- Blato, Zagreb (planned)
- Živaja

=== Estonia ===
- Haapsalu
- Kuressaare
- Narva-Jõesuu
- Otepää
- Pärnu
- Toila
- Värska

=== Finland ===
- Espoo
- Ikaalinen
- Imatra
- Joensuu
- Karjalohja
- Kittilä
- Kuopio
- Kuusamo
- Lappeenranta
- Leppävirta
- Naantali
- Nokia
- Oulu
- Pori
- Porvoo
- Rovaniemi
- Saarijärvi
- Savonlinna
- Tampere
- Turku
- Vaasa

=== France ===
- List of spa towns in France

=== Germany ===
- List of spa towns in Germany

=== Greece ===
- List of spa towns in Greece
- Aidipsos,
- Agkistro, Serres
- Kamena Vourla
- Kimolos
- Loutraki
- Loutra Kyllinis
- Sidirokastro, Serres
- Lakkos of Milos
- Loutrochori, Aridaia, Pella (Pozar)

=== Republic of Ireland ===
- Galway
- Lisdoonvarna

=== Italy ===
- Abano, Montegrotto, Battaglia Terme, Galzignano Terme (Padua)
- Alghero, Castelsardo, Olbia, Santa Teresa Gallura, (Sardinia)
- Bagni di Tivoli, Tivoli, Lazio
- Baiae (historical)
- Bibione
- Boario (Brescia)
- Bormio
- Catania
- Cotilia (Rieti, Lazio)
- Crodo
- Fiuggi
- Ischia
- Maiori
- Merano
- Pantelleria
- Premia
- Pré-Saint-Didier
- Recoaro Terme
- Saint-Vincent, Aosta Valley
- San Giuliano Terme
- San Pellegrino Terme
- Taormina
- Termini Imerese
- Terme di Valdieri (Cuneo)
- Viterbo (Terme dei Papi and Bullicame)
- Vulcano

Emilia Romagna

- Bagno di Romagna
- Brisighella
- Bertinoro
- Bologna
- Castel San Pietro Terme
- Castrocaro Terme
- Cervarezza
- Cervia
- Monticelli Terme
- Porretta Terme
- Riccione
- Rimini
- Riolo Terme
- Salsomaggiore Terme
- Salvarola
- Sant' Andrea Bagni
- Tabiano

Marche

- Acquasanta Terme
- Camerano
- Fano
- Genga
- Macerata Feltria
- Monte Grimano
- Petriano
- Sarnano
- Tolentino

Tuscany

- Bagni di Lucca
- Bagni di Pisa
- Bagni San Filippo
- Bagno Vignoni
- Casciana Terme Lari
- Castelnuovo Berardenga
- Chianciano Terme
- Equi Terme
- Gambassi Terme
- Impruneta
- Monsummano Terme
- Montecatini Terme
- Montepulciano
- Rapolano Terme
- San Casciano dei Bagni
- Sassetta
- Saturnia
- Sorano
- Uliveto Terme
- Venturina

Umbria

- Città di Castello
- Massa Martana
- Sangemini
- Spello

Abruzzo

- Canistro
- Caramanico Terme
- Popoli
- Raiano

=== Latvia ===
- Jūrmala
- Ance

=== Lithuania ===
- Birštonas
- Druskininkai
- Neringa
- Palanga

=== Macedonia ===
- Negorski Banji
- Banja Banishte
- Banja Bansko
- Banja Kežovica
- Banja Car Samoil
- Katlanovska Banja
- Banja Kočani
- Debarski Banji
- Kumanovska Banja
- Banja Strnovec

=== Moldova ===
- Cahul
- Călăraşi
- Camenca
- Hirjauca
- Malovata
- Orhei
- Vadul lui Vodă

=== Portugal ===
- Termas de Alcafache
- Termas de Almeida Fonte Santa
- Termas das Caldas de Aregos
- Termas de Cabeço de Vide
- Termas das Caldas da Rainha
- Termas de Caldelas
- Termas do Carapacho, Azores
- Termas do Carvalhal, Mamouros
- Termas de Chaves
- Termas do Cró
- Termas da Curia
- Termas de Entre-os-Rios
- Termas do Estoril
- Termas das Caldas da Felgueira
- Termas do Gerês
- Termas da Ladeira de Envendos
- Termas da Longroiva
- Termas de Luso
- Caldas de Manteigas
- Termas de Melgaço
- Caldas de Monchique
- Termas de Monfortinho
- Termas de Monte Real
- Termas de Nisa
- Termas de Pedras Salgadas
- Termas de S. Jorge
- Termas de Sangemil
- Caldas Santas de Carvalhelhos
- Termas de São Pedro do Sul
- Termas de São Vicente
- Caldas da Saúde
- Caldas das Taipas
- Termas de Unhais da Serra
- Termas do Vale da Mó
- Termas de Vidago
- Termas do Vimeiro

=== Romania ===
- Amara
- Balvanyos
- Bazna
- Băile Felix
- Băile Govora
- Băile Herculane
- Băile Olăneşti
- Băile Tuşnad
- Borsec
- Buziaş
- Călimăneşti-Căciulata
- Cluj-Napoca
- Covasna
- Eforie Sud
- Geoagiu
- Iaşi-Nicolina
- Lacu Sărat
- Mangalia
- Miercurea Sibiului
- Moneasa
- Neptun
- Ocna Sibiului
- Ocna Şugatag
- Sângeorz-Băi
- Sinaia
- Slănic
- Slănic Moldova
- Sovata
- Soveja
- Stâna de Vale
- Techirghiol
- Turda
- Tuşnad
- Vatra Dornei
- Voineasa

=== Serbia ===
- Banja Koviljača
- Bogutovačka Banja
- Bujanovačka Banja
- Bukovička Banja
- Divčibare
- Gamzigradska Banja
- Gornja Trepča
- Jošanička Banja
- Kanjiža
- Kuršumlijska Banja
- Mataruška Banja
- Niška Banja
- Sijarinska Banja
- Sokobanja
- Vranjska Banja
- Vrdnik
- Vrnjačka Banja
- Vrujci

=== Slovakia ===
- Bardejov, featuring also Bardejov - Družba
- Bojnice
- Brusno
- Číž
- Dudince, featuring also Dudince - Diamant
- Horný Smokovec
- Korytnica-kúpele
- Kováčová, featuring also Kováčová - Marína and Kováčová - Detvan
- Liptovský Ján
- Lúčivná
- Lúčky
- Nimnica
- Nový Smokovec, featuring also Nový Smokovec - Tatrasan
- Piešťany
- Rajecké Teplice
- Tatranská Lomnica sanatorium
- Sklené Teplice
- Sliač
- Smrdáky
- Štós
- Štrbské Pleso
- Tatranské Matliare
- Tatranské Zruby
- Trenčianske Teplice
- Turčianske Teplice
- Vyšné Ružbachy

=== Slovenia ===
- Banovci
- Bohinjska Bistrica
- Čatež ob Savi
- Dobrna
- Dobova
- Dolenjske Toplice
- Laško
- Lendava
- Podčetrtek
- Portorož
- Ptuj
- Radenci
- Rogaška Slatina
- Snovik
- Strunjan
- Šmarješke Toplice
- Terme 3000 - Moravske Toplice
- Topolšica
- Zreče

=== Spain ===
- Alange, Badajoz
- Alcantud, Cuenca
- Alhama de Aragon, Zaragoza
- Alhama de Granada
- Archena, Murcia
- Arnedo, La Rioja
- A Arnoia, Ourense
- Beteta, Cuenca
- Caldes de Malavella, Girona
- Caldes de Montbui, Barcelona
- Castro Caldelas, Pontevedra
- Zestoa, Gipuzkoa
- Chiclana de la Frontera, Cádiz
- Fitero, Navarra
- Fortuna, Murcia
- Fuente-Olmedo, Valladolid
- Guitiriz, Lugo
- Lanjarón, Granada
- Ledesma, Salamanca
- Liérganes, Cantabria
- Mondariz, Pontevedra
- Illa da Toxa, Pontevedra
- Panticosa, Huesca
- Pechina, Almería
- Peñarrubia, Cantabria
- Puente Viesgo, Cantabria
- Retortillo, Salamanca
- Solares, Cantabria
- Cuntis, Pontevedra

=== Switzerland ===
- Baden
- Bad Ragaz
- Davos
- Lavey-les-Bains
- Leukerbad
- Schinznach Bad
- Vals, Switzerland
- Yverdon-les-Bains
- Zurzach

=== Ukraine ===
==== Crimea ====
- Alupka
- Alushta
- Yevpatoria
- Feodosiya
- Foros
- Gaspra
- Kerch
- Koreiz
- Livadia
- Miskhor
- Partenit
- Simeiz
- Sudak
- Yalta

==== Regions ====
- Berdyansk
- Kherson
- Skadovsk
- Khmilnyk
- Kuyalnyk
- Myrhorod
- Morshyn
- Skhidnytsia
- Truskavets
- Zatoka

=== United Kingdom ===
- List of spa towns in the United Kingdom

== In Oceania ==
=== Australia ===
- Daylesford Victorian Mineral Water Committee
- Hepburn Springs Victorian Mineral Water Committee
- Mornington Peninsula

=== New Zealand ===
- Te Aroha, Waikato
- Whitianga, Coromandel Peninsula
- Hanmer Springs
- Maruia Springs
- Rotorua
- Taupo
- Te Puia Springs
- Waimangu
- Waingaro
- Waiwera
- Parakai

== See also ==
- Spa town
- Seaside resort
- Resort architecture
- List of conservation topics
- Sauna
- Day spa
