= Moorland =

Type of habitat

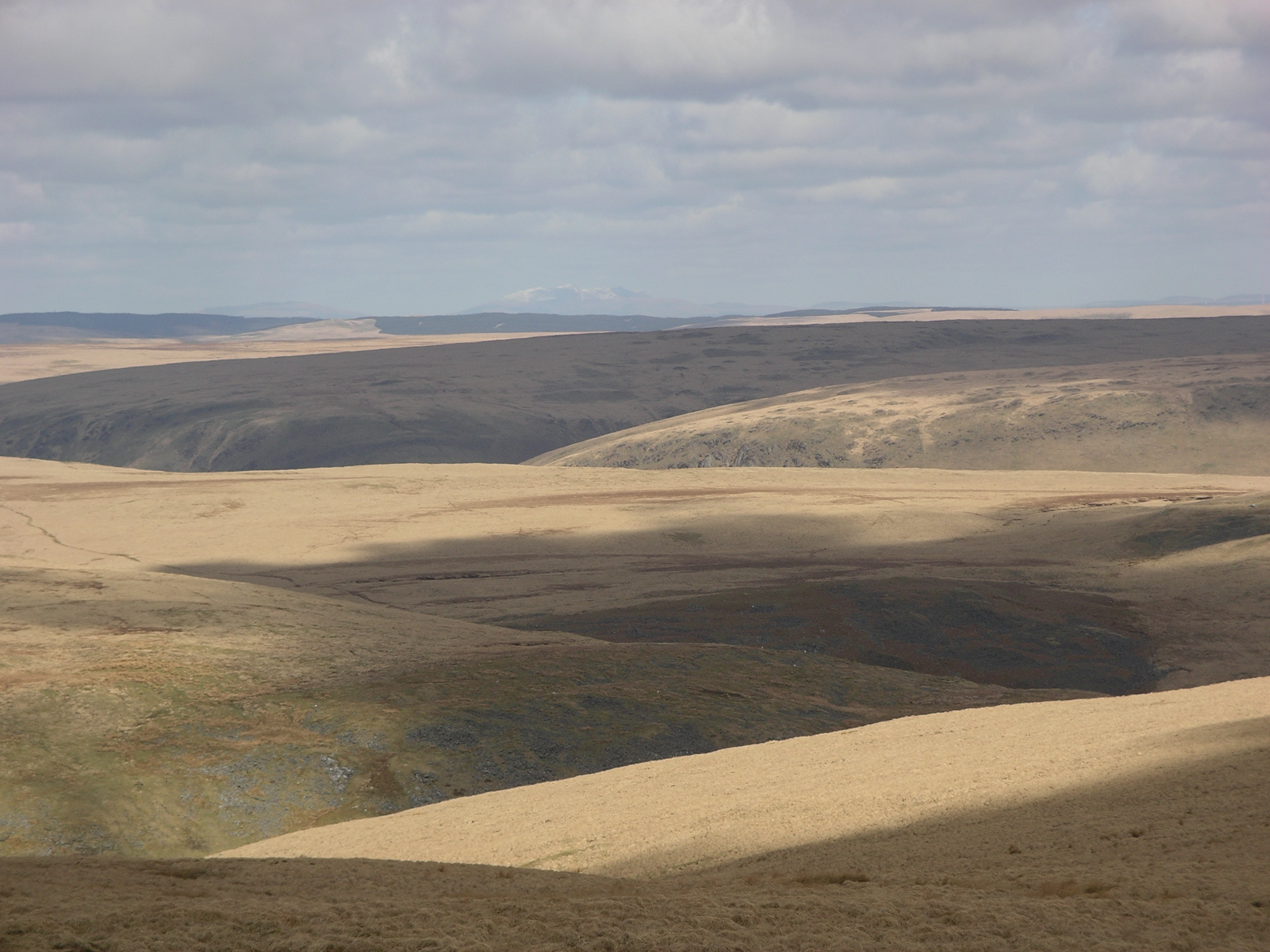
Extensive moorland in the Desert of Wales

Moorland or moor is a type of habitat found in upland areas in temperate grasslands, savannas, and shrublands and the biomes of montane grasslands and shrublands, characterised by low-growing vegetation on acidic soils. Moorland today generally means uncultivated hill land (such as Dartmoor in South West England), but also includes low-lying wetlands (such as Sedgemoor, also South West England). It is closely related to heath, although experts disagree on the exact distinction between these types of vegetation. Generally, moor refers to highland and high rainfall areas, while heath refers to lowland zones which are more likely to be the result of human activity.

Moorland habitats are found mainly in tropical Africa, northern and western Europe, and South America. Most of the world's moorlands are diverse ecosystems. In the extensive moorlands of the tropics, biodiversity can be extremely high. Moorland is also related to tundra (where the subsoil is permafrost or permanently frozen soil), appearing as the tundra and the natural tree zone. The boundary between tundra and moorland constantly shifts with climatic change.

== Heather moorland ==
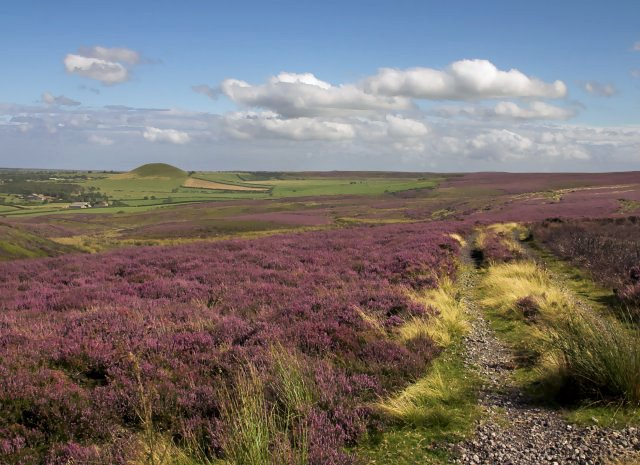
Heather moorland on the North York Moors mainly consisting of Calluna vulgaris

Heathland and moorland are the most extensive areas of semi-natural vegetation in the British Isles. The moorlands of eastern Britain are similar to heaths, but are distinguished by having a covering of peat. On western moors, the peat layer can be several metres thick. Scottish "muirs" are generally heather moors, but also have extensive cover of grass, cotton-grass, mosses, bracken and undergrowth such as crowberry, with the wetter moorland having sphagnum moss merging into bog-land.

The extent to which human activity was responsible for the creation of moors is a subject with a considerable degree of uncertainty. Oliver Rackham writes that pollen analysis shows that some moorland, such as those on the islands and in the far north of Scotland, are clearly natural, never having had trees, whereas much of the Pennine moorland area was forested in Mesolithic times. How much the deforestation was caused by climatic change and how much by human activity is uncertain.

== Ecology ==
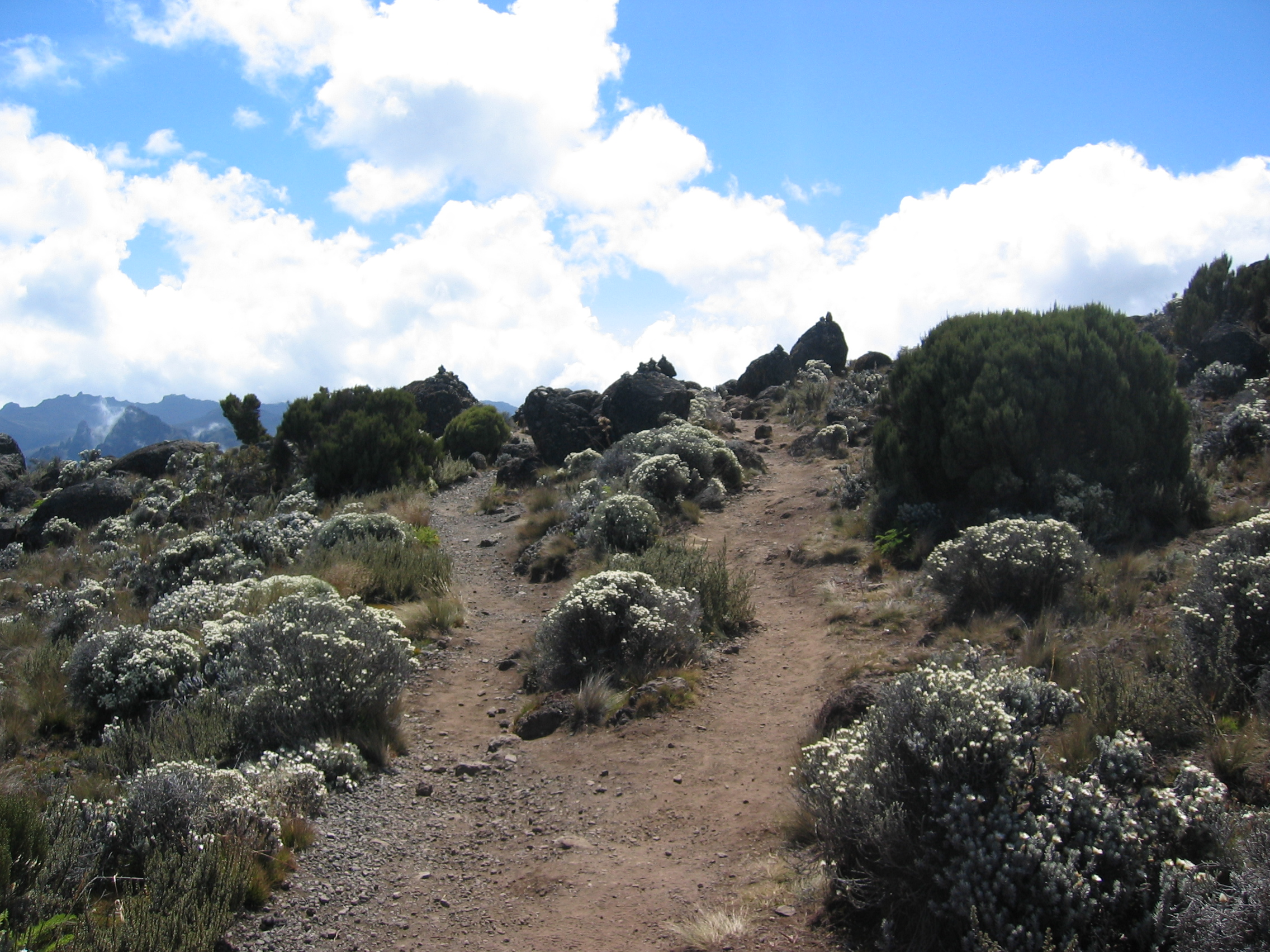
Moorland of Kilimanjaro

A variety of different habitat types can be found in different world regions of moorland. The wildlife and vegetation forms often lead to high endemism due to the chemically harsh soil and microclimate characteristics. An example of this is the Exmoor Pony, a rare horse breed which has adapted to the harsh conditions in England's Exmoor.

In Europe, the associated fauna consists of bird species such as red grouse, hen harrier, merlin, golden plover, curlew, skylark, meadow pipit, whinchat, ring ouzel, and twite. Other species dominate in moorlands elsewhere. Reptiles are few due to the cooler conditions. In Europe, only the common viper is frequent, though in other regions moorlands are commonly home to dozens of reptile species. Amphibians such as frogs are well represented in moorlands. When moorland is overgrazed, woody vegetation is often lost, being replaced by coarse, unpalatable grasses and bracken, with a greatly reduced fauna.

Some hill sheep breeds, such as the Scottish Blackface and the Lonk, thrive on the austere conditions of heather moors.

== Management ==
Burning of moorland has been practised for a number of reasons, including when grazing is insufficient to control growth. This is recorded in Britain in the fourteenth century. Uncontrolled burning frequently caused (and causes) problems and was banned by statute in 1609. With the rise of sheep and grouse management in the nineteenth century, it again became common practice. Heather is burnt at about 10 or 12 years old when its regenerative capacity is optimal. However, if the stems are left to mature for a longer period, they will tend to burn more aggressively, hindering the process of regeneration. Burning of moorland vegetation needs to be very carefully controlled, as the peat itself is susceptible to combustion, which can be challenging, if not impossible, to extinguish. Moreover, uncontrolled burning of heather can promote the growth of bracken and rough grass, which ultimately leads to a reduction in value of the vegetation for grazing. As a result, burning is now a controversial practice; Rackham calls it "second-best land management".

Mechanical cutting of the heather has been used in Europe, but it is important that the material is removed to avoid choking regrowth. If heather and other vegetation is left standing for too long, a large amount of dry and combustible material will accumulate. This can lead to a wildfire burning out a large area, although heather seeds have been found to germinate better when exposed to the brief heat of controlled burning.

In terms of managing moorland for wildlife in the UK, vegetation characteristics are important for passerine abundance, while predator control benefits red grouse, golden plover, and curlew abundances. Many management options are needed to benefit multiple species. However, management must be carried out in locations that are also suitable for species in terms of physical characteristics such as topography, climate and soil.

== In literature ==
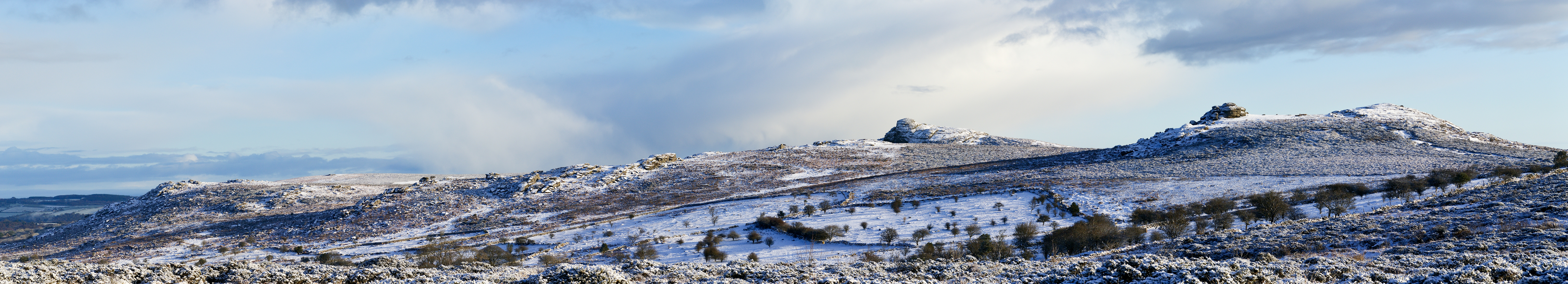
Dartmoor in winter covered in snow. Several tors top the sparsely vegetated hills.

In Western cultures, the development of a sensitivity to nature and one's physical surroundings grew with the rise of interest in landscape painting, and particularly the works of artists that favoured wide and deep prospects, and rugged scenery. To the English Romantic imagination, moorlands fitted this image perfectly, enhancing the emotional impact of the story by placing it within a heightened and evocative landscape. Moorland forms the setting of various works of late Romantic English literature, ranging from the Yorkshire moorland in Emily Brontë's Wuthering Heights and The Secret Garden by Frances Hodgson Burnett to Dartmoor in Arthur Conan Doyle's Holmesian mystery The Hound of the Baskervilles. They are also featured in Charlotte Brontë's Jane Eyre representing the heroine's desolation and loneliness after leaving Mr Rochester.

Enid Blyton's The Famous Five series featured the young protagonists adventuring across various moorlands where they confronted criminals or other individuals of interest. Such a setting enhanced the plot as the drama unfolded away from the functioning world where the children could solve their own problems and face greater danger. Moorland in the Forest of Bowland in Lancashire is the setting for Walter Bennett's The Pendle Witches, the true story of some of England's most notorious witch trials. In Erin Hunter's Warriors series, one of the four Clans, WindClan, lives alone on the moor.

Michael Jecks, author of Knights Templar Mysteries, sets his books in and around Dartmoor, England. Paul Kingsnorth’s Beast is also set on a western English moor, using the barren landscape and fields of heather to convey themes of timelessness and distance from civilisation.

== Notable moorlands ==
=== Africa ===
==== Democratic Republic of the Congo ====
- Ruwenzori-Virunga montane moorlands

==== Ethiopia ====
- Ethiopian montane moorlands

==== Kenya ====
- East African montane moorlands
- Mount Kenya

==== Rwanda ====
- Ruwenzori-Virunga montane moorlands

==== Sudan ====
- East African montane moorlands
- Ethiopian montane moorlands

==== Tanzania ====
- East African montane moorlands
- Kilimanjaro
- Mount Meru

==== Uganda ====
- East African montane moorlands

=== Europe ===
==== Austria ====
- Tanner Moor
- Längsee Moor
- Moorbad Gmös

==== Belgium ====
- Weißer Stein (Eifel)
- High Fens

==== France ====
- Monts d'Arrée

==== Germany ====
- Großes Torfmoor
- Hücker Moor
- Oppenwehe Moor
- Worringer Bruch
- High Fens

==== The Netherlands ====
- Dwingelderveld
- Bargerveen
- Fochteloërveen
- The Peel

==== Great Britain ====
Great Britain is home to an estimated 10–15% of the world's moors. Notable areas of upland moorland in Britain include the Lake District, the Pennines (including the Dark Peak and Forest of Bowland), Mid Wales, the Southern Uplands of Scotland, the Scottish Highlands, and a few pockets in the West Country.

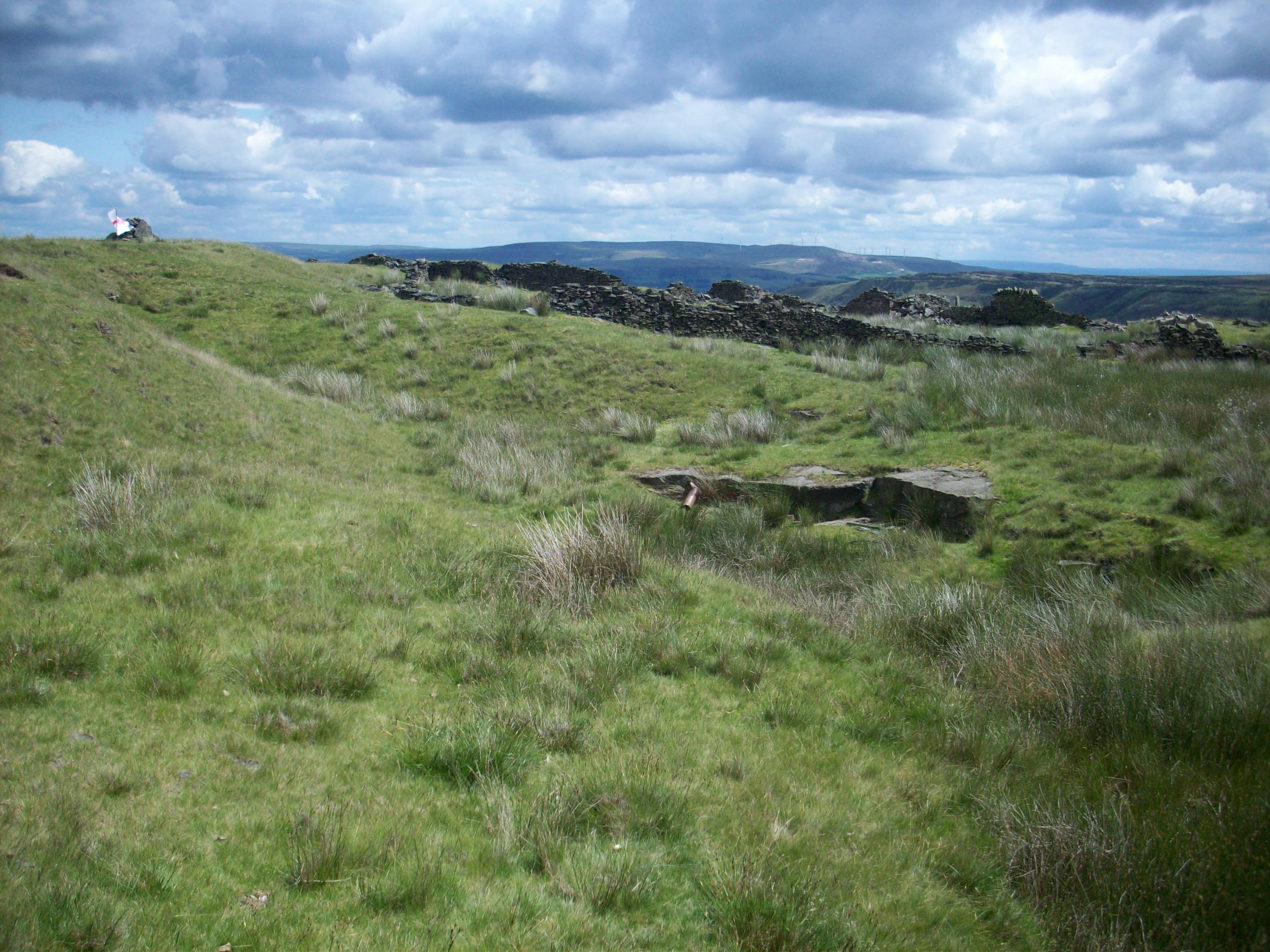
Oswaldtwistle Moor, part of the West Pennine Moors, in Lancashire, UK

- Bleaklow, Dark Peak
- Bodmin Moor, Cornwall
- Black Mountains, Wales
- Brecon Beacons, Wales
- Dartmoor, Devon
- Drumossie Moor, often called Culloden Moor, the site of the Battle of Culloden
- Exmoor, West Somerset & North Devon
- Forest of Bowland, Lancashire
- Hexhamshire Moors, Northumberland and County Durham
- North York Moors, North Yorkshire
- Migneint, Gwynedd
- Mynydd Hiraethog, Denbighshire and Conwy
- Penwith, Cornwall
- Rannoch Moor, Highlands, Scotland
- Rombalds Moor (including Ilkley Moor), West Yorkshire
- Rossendale Valley, Lancashire
- Saddleworth Moor, Greater Manchester
- Shropshire Hills, small pockets of moorland such as the Long Mynd
- West Pennine Moors, including Oswaldtwistle Moor, Haslingden Moor, Rivington Moor and Darwen Moor in Lancashire
- Yorkshire Dales National Park, North Yorkshire
- Ythan Estuary complex, Aberdeenshire, Scotland: largest coastal moorland in the British Isles, known for high biodiversity

==== Italy ====
In Italy, moorlands are known as brughiera. The term derives from brugo, the Italian name for Calluna vulgaris, one of the dominant species in these habitats. Italian moorlands are often highly fragmented and difficult to map, as they typically occur on poor, acidic or sandy soils and survive today only in relict patches. They are most widespread in Northern Italy, especially in Piedmont and Lombardy, but environments with similar ecological features can also be found in parts of Sicily and Sardinia.

Notable Italian moorland areas include:

- Parco delle Groane, Lombardy – One of the southernmost heathland systems in Europe, characterised by extensive Calluna heath, Scots pine, and birch.
- Riserva naturale della Vauda, Piedmont (Canavese) – A large protected area featuring dry heathland, grasslands, and open woodland mosaics.
- Magredi, Friuli-Venezia Giulia – Stony, arid grasslands with heath-like vegetation on alluvial fans at the foothills of the Alps.
- Gerbido, Piedmont – A patchwork of dry heath, xeric grasslands, and poor soils supporting typical brughiera vegetation.
- Vaccinieto communities in the Cottian Alps and in the Appennino Tosco-Emiliano National Park – High-altitude heaths dominated by Vaccinium species, ecologically related to moorland environments

==== Spain ====
Moorlands are called páramos in Spanish. They are particularly common in Northern Spain and the Meseta Central.

- Boedo, Palencia, Castile
- Páramo del Duratón, Castile
- Paramo de Masa, Burgos, Castile
- Páramo del Sil, Galicia
- Las Loras, Castile

=== North America ===
==== United States ====
Two similar habitats, although more arid, found in western North America:

- Siskiyou plateau
- High Desert (Oregon)

=== South America ===
==== Argentina and Chile ====
- Magellanic moorland

==== Brazil ====
Brazil's "moorland" or high-altitude grassland ecosystems, known as Campos Rupestres (rupestrian grasslands), are biodiverse, rocky, and often misty environments located mostly in the Espinhaço Range of Minas Gerais and Bahia. These unique areas are characterised by nutrient-poor, shallow soils, high levels of biodiversity and endemic species.

==== Colombia ====
Colombia is one of only three countries in the world to be home to páramo (tropical moorland) and more than 60% of the paramo regions are found on its soil.

- Sumapaz Páramo, Bogotá
- Chingaza National Natural Park, Cundinamarca department
- Oceta Páramo, Boyacá Department
- Iguaque, Boyacá Department
- Puracé, Cauca Department
- Páramo de Santurbán, Santander Department
- Sierra Nevada del Cocuy, Arauca Department, Boyacá Department, Casanare Department
- Santa Marta páramo, Magdalena Department, La Guajira Department, Cesar Department

== See also ==
- Fen
- Páramo
