= Herbert Budka =

Austrian physician and neuropathologist

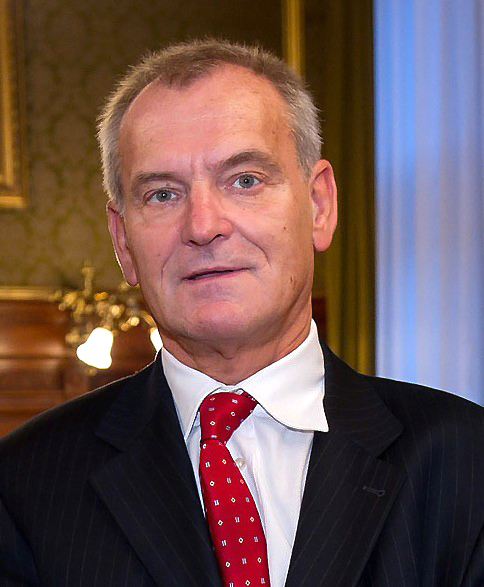
- Herbert Budka (2010)
- Born: September 22, 1946 (age 80); Bad Kreuzen, Upper Austria, Austria
- Education: University of Vienna (MD)
- Occupation: Neuropathologist
- Known for: Infectious diseases of the nervous system, prion diseases
- Awards: Austrian Scientist of the Year (1998); City of Vienna Prize for Medical Sciences (2010)

Herbert Budka (born 22 September 1946) is an Austrian physician and neuropathologist. He was professor of neuropathology and director of the Clinical Institute of Neurology at the University of Vienna and Medical University of Vienna. His research has focused on infectious diseases of the nervous system, particularly HIV/AIDS and prion diseases, as well as neurodegenerative diseases and brain tumors. He has contributed to international diagnostic criteria and classification systems for neurological diseases and to European research and risk assessment concerning transmissible spongiform encephalopathies (TSEs).

Budka headed the Austrian Reference Centre for Human Prion Diseases and served as president of the International Society of Neuropathology from 2010 to 2014. He was named Austrian Scientist of the Year for 1998 and received the City of Vienna Prize for Medical Sciences in 2010. Outside his academic work, he has been involved in medical human-rights initiatives, including Amnesty International and Hemayat.

== Early life and education ==
Budka was born on 22 September 1946 in Bad Kreuzen, Upper Austria. His parents had left Vienna after their home was destroyed during World War II, and the family returned to Vienna when he was three years old. He attended the Theresianum in Vienna, graduating in 1964.

From 1964 to 1971, Budka studied medicine at the University of Vienna, receiving his medical doctorate in 1971. During his studies, he developed an interest in histology and pathology. In 1971, he joined the Neurological Institute of the University of Vienna, where he trained in neuropathology under Kurt Jellinger. After clinical training in internal medicine, psychiatry and neurology, Budka qualified in 1980 as a specialist in neurology and psychiatry, then a combined medical specialty in Austria. He completed his habilitation in neuropathology in 1982.

== Career ==
Budka spent most of his academic career at the Neurological Institute of the University of Vienna, which had been founded by Heinrich Obersteiner in 1882. After Jellinger left the institute in 1975, Budka assumed increasing responsibility for diagnostic neuropathology. His early work included cerebrovascular diseases, encephalopathies, viral infections and brain tumours. He was also involved in introducing immunohistochemical methods into neuropathological diagnosis and research at the institute.

In 1991, Budka became deputy head of the Clinical Division of Neuropathology and Neurochemistry. In 1995, he became chair of the Clinical Institutes section of the medical faculty. The Neurological Institute moved to the newly constructed Vienna General Hospital in 1993 and became the Clinical Institute of Neurology; Budka was involved in planning its new facilities.

In 1999, Budka became professor of neuropathology and director of the Clinical Institute of Neurology. He remained director until his retirement on 1 October 2011, exactly 40 years after joining the Neurological Institute. He also worked as a court-appointed expert in neurology and psychiatry, specialising in neuropathology. His work as an expert in legal proceedings continued after his university retirement.

In May 2012, Budka joined the Institute of Neuropathology at the University Hospital of Zürich as a consultant under its director, Adriano Aguzzi. During this period, he commuted between Vienna and Zurich. He returned to Vienna at the end of 2016 and continued forensic neuropathological work and scientific research.

== Research ==
=== HIV and infectious neuropathology ===
Infectious diseases of the nervous system were an early focus of Budka's research. With the emergence of AIDS in Europe during the 1980s, he investigated the neuropathological manifestations of HIV infection. In 1986, he described multinucleated giant cells as a characteristic feature of HIV encephalitis.

Together with Austrian and international collaborators, Budka subsequently investigated the neuropathology of large series of AIDS autopsies, including a 1987 study of 100 patients. His research addressed HIV-associated encephalitis, leukoencephalopathy, neuronal loss and the cellular localisation of HIV in the central nervous system. Subsequent work identified microglia and macrophages as principal sites of productive HIV infection in the brain.

In 1991, Budka published the review "Neuropathology of Human Immunodeficiency Virus Infection", which synthesised the emerging neuropathological knowledge of HIV infection. His work on infectious neuropathology also included tick-borne encephalitis and other viral infections of the nervous system.

=== Prion diseases ===
From the early 1990s, prion diseases became a major focus of Budka's research. He participated in investigations of the original Austrian family described by Josef Gerstmann, Ernst Sträussler and Ilya Scheinker, after whom Gerstmann–Sträussler–Scheinker syndrome is named. Research with international collaborators demonstrated a P102L mutation of the PRNP gene in members of the original family.

Beginning in 1994, Budka coordinated European Commission-funded research networks concerned with the neuropathological diagnosis and classification of human prion diseases. In 1995, an international group led by Budka published neuropathological diagnostic criteria for Creutzfeldt–Jakob disease (CJD) and other human spongiform encephalopathies. He subsequently participated in international collaborative studies addressing the molecular and phenotypic classification of sporadic CJD, including studies published in 1999 and 2003.

Budka has also co-authored research on experimental prion models. A 2010 Acta Neuropathologica paper, for example, was the first report of the induction of a transmissible prion disease in wild-type animals by synthetic prions using recombinant prion protein.

His collaborative work also included research on genetic prion diseases and international surveillance of CJD. A 2005 EUROCJD study examined the distribution and frequency of genetic prion diseases across participating countries. Another study published that year compared mortality from CJD and related disorders across Europe, Australia and Canada.

In 1996, the Austrian Reference Centre for Human Prion Diseases was formally established at the Neurological Institute, with Budka as its head. The centre combined epidemiological surveillance with diagnostic and research activities. Budka headed the centre until 2011, when Gábor G. Kovács became its head.

Following the emergence of bovine spongiform encephalopathy (BSE) and variant Creutzfeldt–Jakob disease, Budka became involved in European scientific risk assessment. He served on the TSE/BSE Ad Hoc Group of the European Commission's Scientific Steering Committee and subsequently on the Biological Hazards Panel of the European Food Safety Authority (EFSA), where he served as vice-chair.

=== Brain tumours and neurodegenerative diseases ===
Budka has also worked on the diagnosis and classification of tumours of the nervous system. He participated in the development of successive editions of the World Health Organization classification of central nervous system tumours, beginning with work on the second edition in the early 1990s. His research included the application of immunohistochemical and molecular methods to brain-tumour diagnosis.

His research on neurodegenerative diseases has included Lewy body disease, Parkinson's disease, tauopathies and mixed neurodegenerative pathologies associated with ageing. In the 1980s, he collaborated with Japanese neuropathologist Kenji Kosaka and colleagues on the description of a diffuse form of Lewy body disease characterised by numerous cortical Lewy bodies.

Later work addressed the distribution and classification of disease-associated proteins and age-related neuropathologies. Budka also participated in an international consensus study establishing a harmonised terminology and evaluation strategy for aging-related tau astrogliopathy (ARTAG). Published in 2016, the study proposed standardised morphological and anatomical criteria for identifying and reporting ARTAG.

== Professional and advisory activities ==
Budka has held leadership positions in Austrian, European and international neuropathology organisations. He served several terms as president of the Austrian Society of Neuropathology and later became president of the European Confederation of Neuropathological Societies (Euro-CNS). Within the International Society of Neuropathology, he served as Austrian national councillor and vice-president before serving as president from 2010 to 2014.

He was involved in establishing neuropathology as a formally recognised medical specialty in Austria and participated in international neuropathology training initiatives. His scientific advisory activities included work on BSE and other transmissible spongiform encephalopathies for European institutions.

== Human rights activities ==
Alongside his medical and academic work, Budka has been involved in human-rights activities. Following a visit to Auschwitz in 1979, he founded the first medical group of Amnesty International in Vienna. The group worked with refugees, examining and documenting medical evidence of torture. Budka also participated in Amnesty International missions investigating prison conditions in Germany.

In 1995, Budka was also involved with Hemayat, a Vienna-based organisation providing medical, psychological and psychotherapeutic care to survivors of torture and war. He subsequently served as president of the organisation.

== Awards and honour ==
- 1982 – Moore Award of the American Association of Neuropathologists.
- 1998 – Europe & Medicine Senior Award, and selected as Austrian Scientist of the Year for 1998, awarded by Austria's education and science journalists in recognition of both scientific achievement and public communication of research.
- 2004 – Honorary doctorate from the Medical University of ■ód■.
- 2008 – Dorothy Russell Memorial Lecture and associated medal, British Neuropathological Society.
- 2010 – City of Vienna Prize for Medical Sciences. The Medical University of Vienna reported the award as recognition of his scientific work and described his roles in teaching, diagnostic neuropathology, research and postgraduate training.
- Also received the Kardinal Innitzer Würdigungspreis for Natural Sciences (date not specified in source).

== Selected publications ==
- Budka, Herbert (1986). "Multinucleated giant cells in brain: a hallmark of the acquired immune deficiency syndrome (AIDS)". Acta Neuropathologica. 69: 253–258. doi:10.1007/BF00688301.
- Budka, Herbert (1991). "Neuropathology of Human Immunodeficiency Virus Infection". Brain Pathology. 1: 163–175. doi:10.1111/j.1750-3639.1991.tb00656.x.
- Budka, Herbert; Aguzzi, Adriano; Brown, Paul; et al. (1995). "Neuropathological Diagnostic Criteria for Creutzfeldt-Jakob Disease (CJD) and Other Human Spongiform Encephalopathies (Prion Diseases)". Brain Pathology. 5: 459–466. doi:10.1111/j.1750-3639.1995.tb00625.x.
- Parchi, P.; Giese, A.; Capellari, S.; et al. (1999). "Classification of sporadic Creutzfeldt-Jakob disease based on molecular and phenotypic analysis of 300 subjects". Annals of Neurology. 46 (2): 224–233.
- Hill, Andrew F.; Joiner, Susan; Wadsworth, Jonathan D. F.; et al. (2003). "Molecular classification of sporadic Creutzfeldt–Jakob disease". Brain. 126 (6): 1333–1346. doi:10.1093/brain/awg125.
