= List of spa towns in Greece =

The following is a list of spa towns in Greece.

- Aidipsos, Euboea
- Agkistro, Serres
- Kaiafa
- Kamena Vourla
- Kimolos
- Krinides, Kavala
- Lakkos of Milos island
- Loutraki
- Loutra Lagkadas
- Loutra Kyllinis
- Loutra, Kythnos island
- Loutra, Nisyros island
- Loutra Ypatis
- Loutrochori, Aridaia, Pella (Pozar)
- Methana
- Nea Apollonia
- Platistomo of Makrakomi
- Polichnitos of Lesbos island
- Sidirokastro, Serres
- Smokovo
- Therma, Ikaria island
- Thermopylae
- Thermi, Thessaloniki

== See also ==
- List of spa towns
