= Plevroma =

Plevroma Πλεύρωμα
- Settlement
- Location within Greece
- Coordinates: 40°43.0′N 22°7.8′E
- Country: Greece
- Administrative region: Central Macedonia
- Regional unit: Pella
- Municipality: Skydra
- Municipal unit: Skydra
- Community: Petraia
- Elevation: 70 m (230 ft)

Population (2021)
  - Total: 212
- Time zone: UTC+2 (EET)
  - Summer (DST): UTC+3 (EEST)
- Postal code: 585 00
- Area code: 23810
- Vehicle registration: ΕΕ

Plevroma (Greek: Πλεύρωμα; formerly Γενή Κιόι Yeni Kioi, Turkish: Yeni Köy; Slavic: Ново село, Novo Selo) is a village in the Pella regional unit of Macedonia, Greece. It is part of the community Petraia within the municipality of Skydra. According to the 2021 census, it has a population of 212.

The nearest train stations, on the OSE's Thessaloniki–Bitola railway, are 1.3 km east (Petraia), 4.2 km southeast (Episkopi) and 6 km northeast (Skydra).

== Geography ==
Location
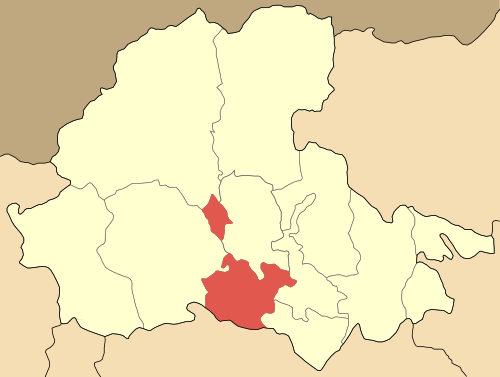

Plevroma is the southwestern part of the municipality of Skydra. It is 19 km southeast of the regional unit capital of Edessa in Central Macedonia, (Greece). Plevroma borders on Imathia to the southwest and it is 24 km northwest of the Imathian capital Veria. It sits at an elevation of around 70 meters above mean sea level and the population is approximately 300 inhabitants.

Plevroma is located 539 kilometers northwest of the present day Greek capital Athens by road, 37 kilometers north of Vergina, the royal capital of ancient Macedon and 76 kilometers northwest of Thessaloniki, the present day capital of Greek Macedonia.

== Economy ==
Plevroma produces apples, cherries and peaches.

== Demographics ==
Census	Population
1928	114
1951	188
1961	262
1971	273
1981	280
1991	276
2001	294
2011	261
2021	212
