= Tanner Moor =

Coordinates: 48°30′31″N 14°51′49″E

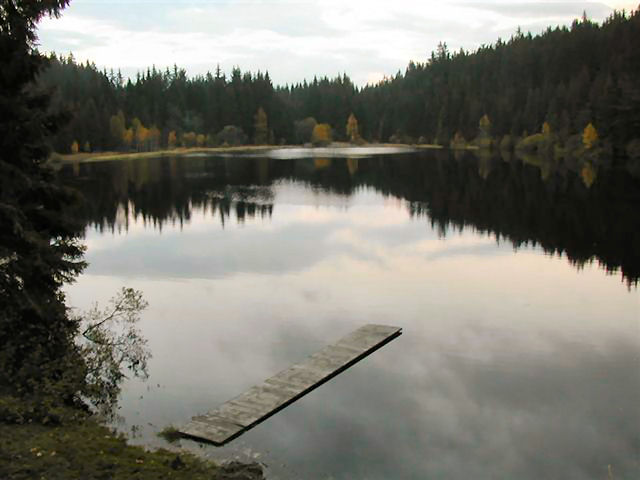
Rubener Pond, Tanner Moor

Tanner Moor is one of the largest moorlands in Austria with a surface area of 120 hectares. Tanner Moor is a Natura 2000 ecologically protected area located on a high granite plateau in the Freistadt district, Mühlviertel, Upper Austria at an average elevation of 900 m.

The moorland is watered exclusively by rain and is almost completely covered with pine trees. There are gaps, however, where typical moorland plants such as Bog-rosemary, Cotton-grass and the Ericaceae, for example upland berries (Vaccinium) and heather (Calluna), flourish. The central area of the moorland has never been used economically, but some of the areas around the edges were planted in spruce in the Twentieth Century. A small dam created Rubener pond was which formerly used in lumbering, but is now just for swimming and fishing. It is a high tannin pond. A six kilometer long trail leads through the moorland, over bridges and past bogs to highlands of mountain pine (Pinus mugo), whence the entire moor can be viewed.

Moorland Trail

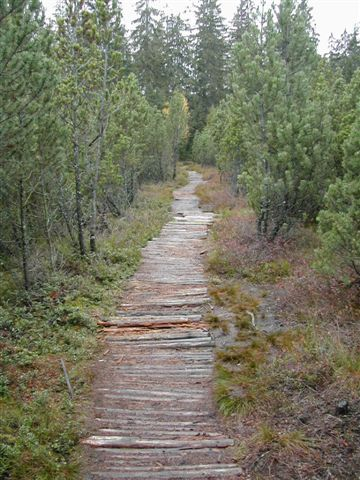
Moorland Trail

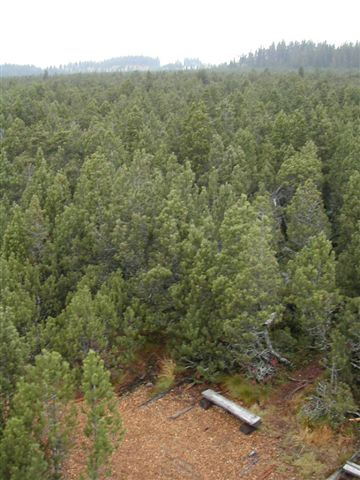
Highland view

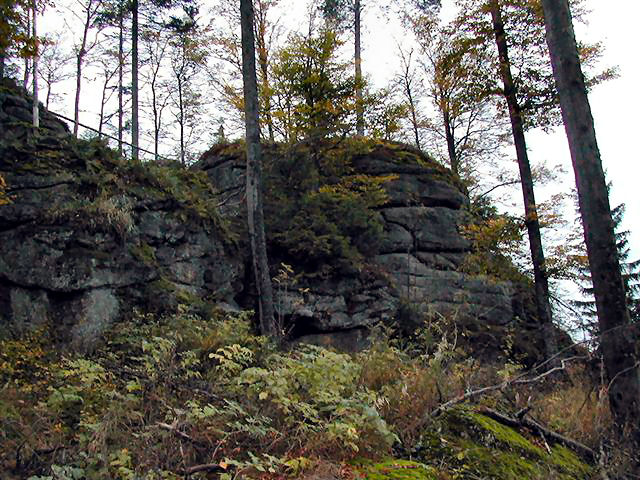
Lehrmüller-Mauer point
