= Skydra railway station =

Greek railway station

Σκύδρα Skydra
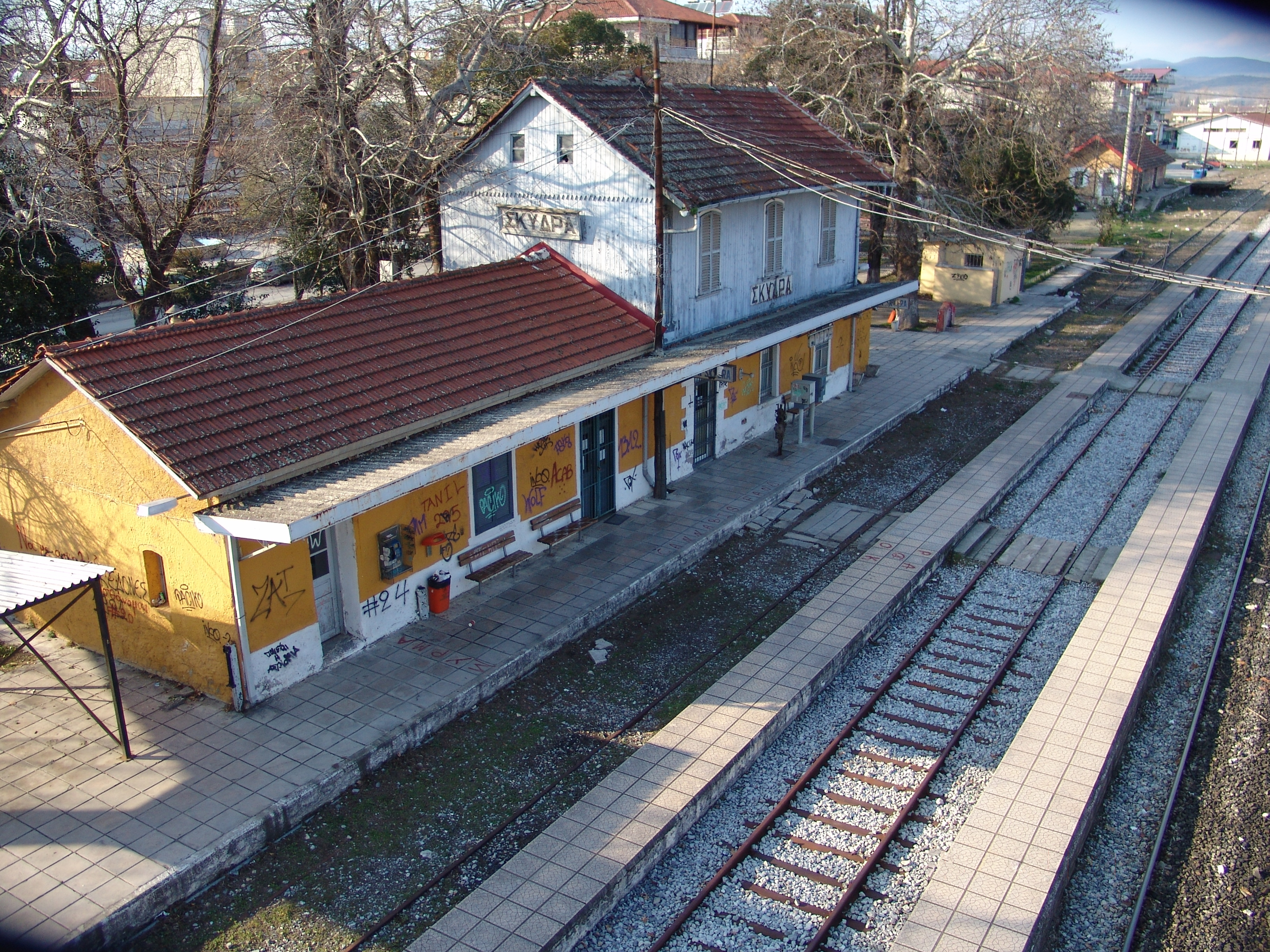
- Edessa station building in January 2018

General information
- Location: Leoforos Nikis, Edessa; Pella; Greece
- Coordinates: 40°46′06″N 22°09′28″E
- Owner: GAIAOSE
- Operator: Hellenic Train
- Line: Thessaloniki–Bitola railway
- Platforms: 4 (1 disused & 1 non-regular use)
- Tracks: 4

Construction
- Structure type: at-grade
- Platform levels: 1
- Parking: Yes
- Cycle facilities: No

Other information
- Website: http://www.ose.gr/en/

History
- Opened: 1894
- Rebuilt: 1916
- Former names: Vertekop

Services
Preceding station	Regional Rail	Following station
Edessa towards Florina	Line T2	Petraia towards Thessaloniki
Location
- Location within Greece

The Skydra railway station (Greek: Σιδηροδρομικός σταθμός Σκύδρας, romanized: Sidirodromikós stathmós Skydra) is the railway station of Skydra in Central Macedonia, Greece. The station is located near the center of the settlement, on the Thessaloniki–Bitola railway, and is severed by the Thessaloniki Regional Railway (formerly the Suburban Railway).

== History ==
The old Vertekop (Skydra) railway station-1891-1894

Opened in June 1894 as Vertekop railway station (Greek: Σιδηροδρομικός σταθμός Βερτεκόπ, romanized: Sidirodromikós stathmós Vertekop) in what was then the Ottoman Empire at the completion of the Société du Chemin de Fer ottoman Salonique-Monastir, a branchline of the Chemins de fer Orientaux from Thessaloniki to Bitola. During this period, Northern Greece and the southern Balkans where still under Ottoman rule, and Skydras was known as Vertekop. Skydra was annexed by Greece on 18 October 1912 during the First Balkan War. The station building was built in 1916 following a decision of the French headquarters in Thessaloniki, with Serbian soldiers worked on the construction of the building. In May 1918, the station was bombed by the German air force. On 17 October 1925 The Greek government purchased the Greek sections of the former Salonica Monastir railway, and the railway became part of the Hellenic State Railways, with the remaining section north of Florina seeded to Yugoslavia. In 1926 the station, along with the settlement, was renamed Skydra. In 1970, OSE became the legal successor to the SEK, taking over responsibilities for most of Greece's rail infrastructure. On 1 January 1971, the station and most of Greek rail infrastructure where transferred to the Hellenic Railways Organisation S.A., a state-owned corporation. Freight traffic declined sharply when the state-imposed monopoly of OSE for the transport of agricultural products and fertilisers ended in the early 1990s. Many small stations of the network with little passenger traffic were closed down.

In 2001 the infrastructure element of OSE was created, known as GAIAOSE, it would henceforth be responsible for the maintenance, of stations, bridges and other elements of the network, as well as the leasing and the sale of railway assists. In 2003, OSE launched "Proastiakos SA", as a subsidiary to serve the operation of the suburban network in the urban complex of Athens during the 2004 Olympic Games. In 2005, TrainOSE was created as a brand within OSE to concentrate on rail services and passenger interface.

Since 2007, the station is served by the Thessaloniki Regional Railway. In 2008, all Proastiakos were transferred from OSE to TrainOSE. In 2009, with the Greek debt crisis unfolding OSE's Management was forced to reduce services across the network. Timetables were cutback, and routes closed as the government-run entity attempted to reduce overheads. In 2017 OSE's passenger transport sector was privatised as TrainOSE, currently a wholly owned subsidiary of Ferrovie dello Stato Italiane infrastructure, including stations, remained under the control of OSE, through it subsidies. In October 2019 a bidding process for the lease of buildings at Skydra railway Station, under GAIAOSE SA According to Law 3891/10. In July 2022, the station began being served by Hellenic Train, the rebranded TranOSE

The station is owned by GAIAOSE, which since 3 October 2001 owns most railway stations in Greece: the company was also in charge of rolling stock from December 2014 until October 2025, when Greek Railways (the owner of the Thessaloniki–Bitola railway) took over that responsibility.

== Facilities ==
The station is still housed in the original brick-built station building; however, as of (2020) it is closed and rundown. There is no ticket office or waiting rooms. There is a footbridge over the lines, though passengers can walk across the rails, it is however not wheelchair accessible.

== Services ==
As of September 2026, Line T2 of the Thessaloniki Regional Railway calls at this station: service is currently limited compared to October 2012, with three trains per day to Thessaloniki, two trains per day to Florina (via Edessa), and one train per day to Edessa.

There are currently no services to Bitola in North Macedonia, because the international connection from Mesonisi to Neos Kafkasos is currently disused.

== Station Layout ==
L Ground/Concourse	Customer service	Tickets/Exits
Level; L1	Side platform, doors will open on the right
Level; L1	Platform 3	non-regular use
Level; L1	Island platform, doors will open on the right
Level; L1	Platform 1	towards Thessaloniki (Petria) ←
Level; L1	Platform 2	towards Florina (Edessa) →
Level; L1	Island platform, doors on the right/left
