= Páramo de Boedo =

- municipality
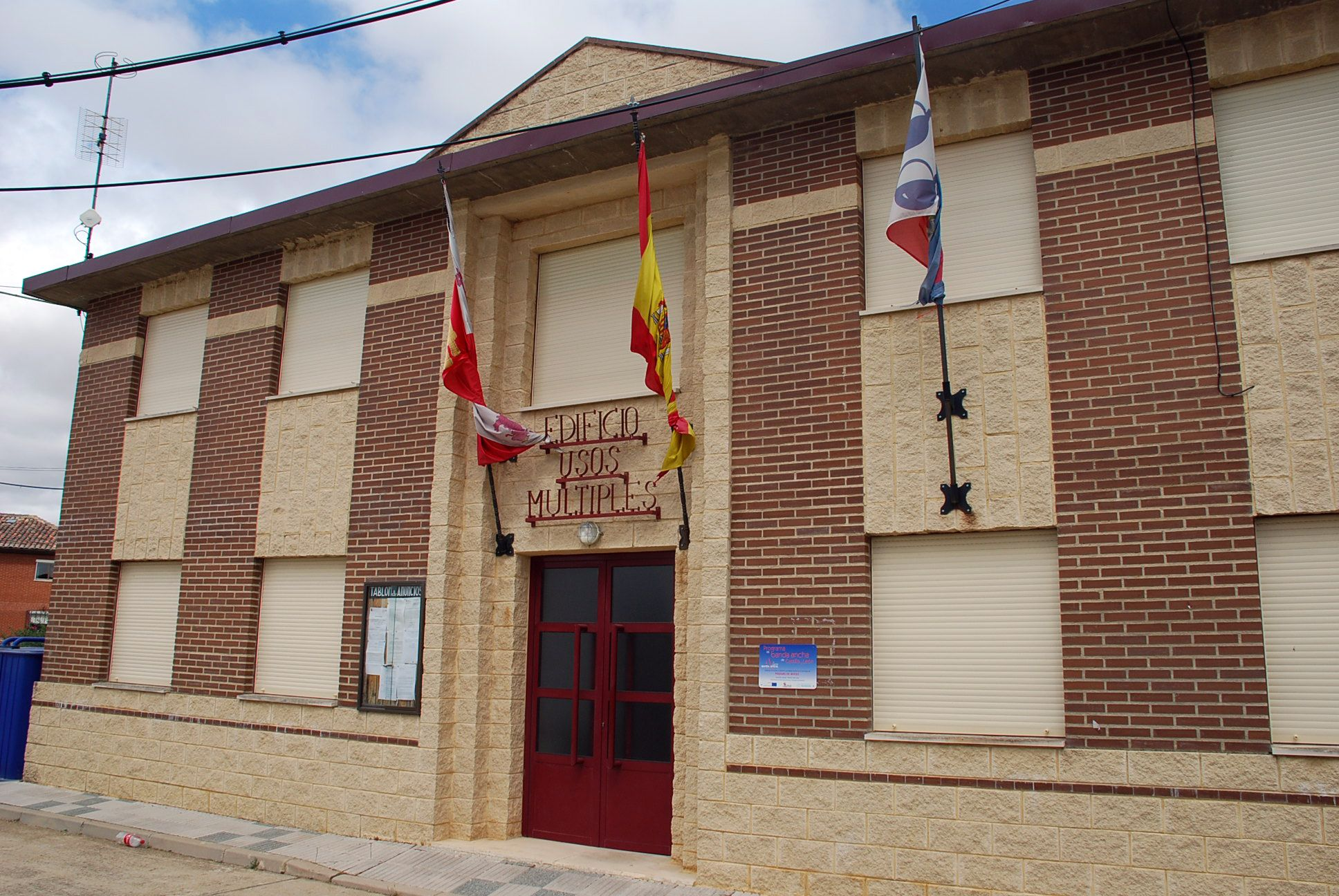

- Flag Coat of arms
- Location of Páramo de Boedo
- Coordinates: 42°34′39″N 4°24′0″W
- Country: Spain
- Autonomous community: Castile and León
- Province: Palencia
- Comarca: Ojeda-Boedo

Area
  - Total: 22 km^{2} (8.5 sq mi)

Population (2025-01-01)
  - Total: 103
  - Density: 4.7/km^{2} (12/sq mi)
- Time zone: UTC+1 (CET)
  - Summer (DST): UTC+2 (CEST)
- Website: Official website

Páramo de Boedo is a municipality located in the province of Palencia, Castile and León, Spain. According to the 2004 census (INE), the municipality has a population of 107 inhabitants.
