= Skydra =

Town in Central Macedonia, Greece

Skydra Σκύδρα
- Municipality
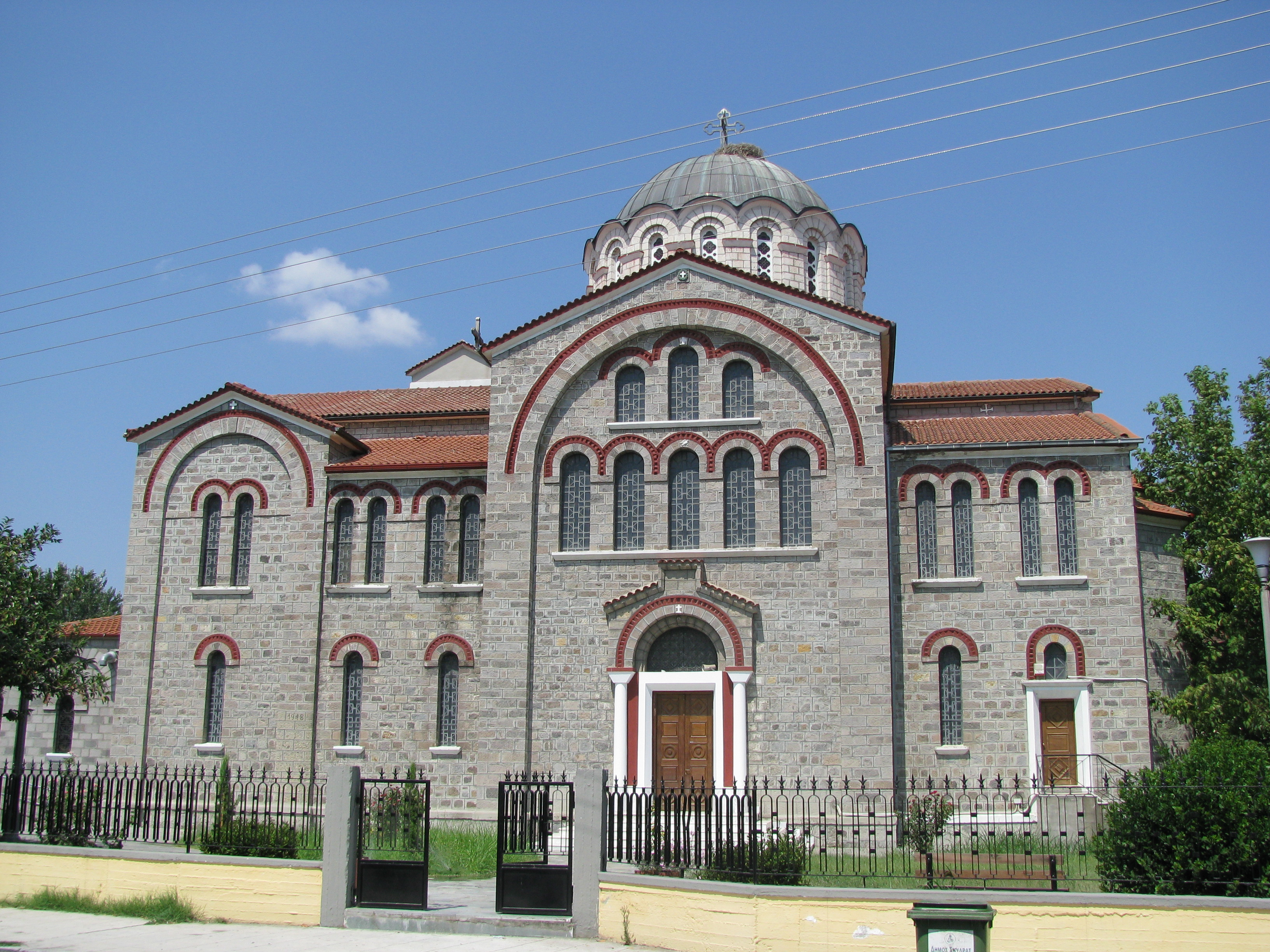
- The central church of Skydra

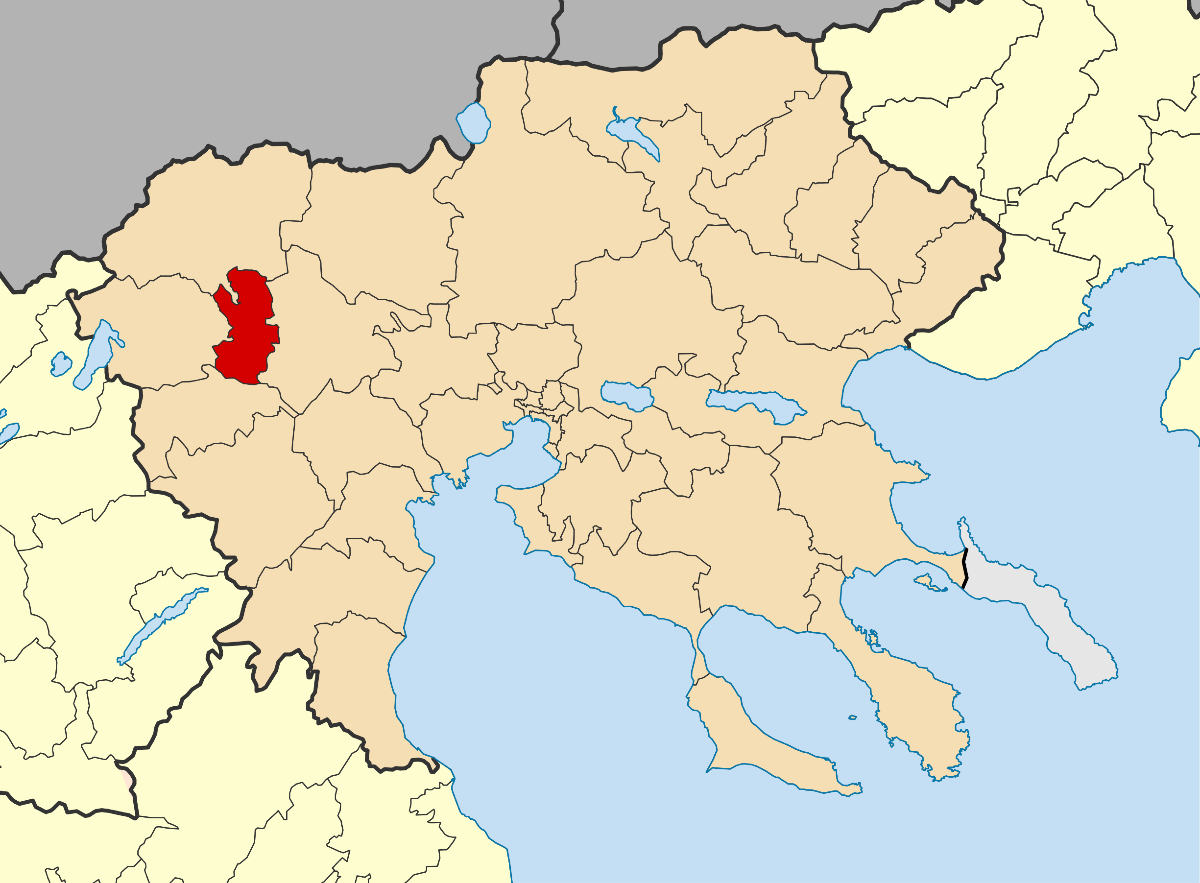

- Location within Greece
- Coordinates: 40°46′N 22°9′E
- Country: Greece
- Administrative region: Central Macedonia
- Regional unit: Pella

Area
  - Municipality: 239.525 km^{2} (92.481 sq mi)
  - Municipal unit: 120.963 km^{2} (46.704 sq mi)
- Elevation: 40 m (130 ft)

Population (2021)
  - Municipality: 18,325
  - Density: 76.506/km^{2} (198.15/sq mi)
  - Municipal unit: 14,353
  - Municipal unit density: 118.66/km^{2} (307.32/sq mi)
  - Community: 5,686
- Time zone: UTC+2 (EET)
  - Summer (DST): UTC+3 (EEST)
- Postal code: 585 00
- Area code: 23810
- Vehicle registration: ΕΕ
- Website: www.skydra.gr

Skydra (Greek: Σκύδρα, pronounced [scˈiðra] in modern Greek, before 1926: Βερτεκόπ - Vertekop, Slavic: Вртикоп, Vrtikop) is a town and a municipality in the Pella regional unit of Central Macedonia, Greece.

== Municipality ==
The municipality Skydra was formed at the 2011 local government reform by the merger of the following 2 former municipalities, that became municipal units:

- Meniida
- Skydra

The municipality has an area of 239.525 km^{2}, the municipal unit 120.963 km^{2}.

=== Municipal unit of Skydra ===
Division of the municipal unit Skidra with total population 14,353 (2021). The 12 communities of Skydra are:

Map	Community	Population (2021)
Skidra is located in Skydra municipality
Skidra is located in Skydra municipality	Skydra	5,686
Skidra is located in Skydra municipality	Arseni	1,241
Skidra is located in Skydra municipality	Aspro	656
Skidra is located in Skydra municipality	Dafni	565
Skidra is located in Skydra municipality	Kalyvia	913
Skidra is located in Skydra municipality	Lipochori	919
Skidra is located in Skydra municipality	Loutrochori	399
Skidra is located in Skydra municipality	Mavrovouni	827
Skidra is located in Skydra municipality	Nea Zoi	128
Skidra is located in Skydra municipality	Petraia (incl. Plevroma)	927
Skidra is located in Skydra municipality	Rizo	911
Skidra is located in Skydra municipality	Sevastiana	1,181
Skidra is located in Skydra municipality	Municipal unit of Skydra	14,353

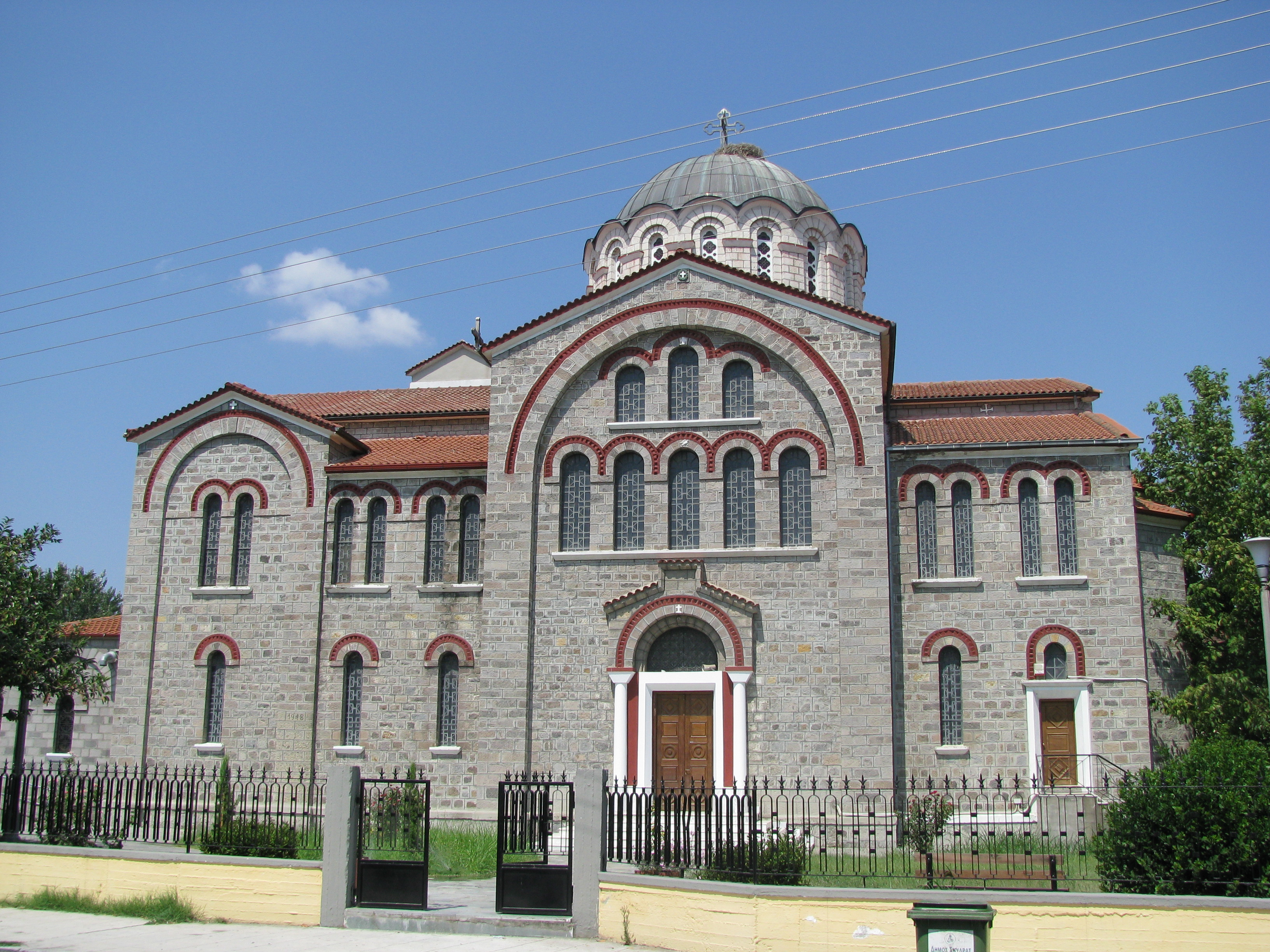
The central church

== History ==
In Skydra there is an ancient settlement in Mandalo. The foundations of a monumental building that probably was a temple of Zeus have been uncovered.

=== Historical Population ===
Year	Community	Municipal unit	Municipality
1991	4,562	15,237	-
2001	5,081	15,654	-
2011	5,406	15,613	20,188
2021	5,686	14,353	18,325

== Sporting teams ==
The town hosts two football clubs:

- Aetos Skydra F.C., plays in the Greek Football League 2
- Nea Genia Skydras, plays in the fifth Division of Greece (amateur league of the Pella Football Clubs Association).

In addition, Skydra has a volleyball team, Aristotelis Skydras V.C., which recently was promoted at the A2 Volleyball League.

== Notable people ==
- Efthymis Koulouris
- Olga Strantzali
- Alexandros Kyziridis
