= Alcantud =

- Municipality
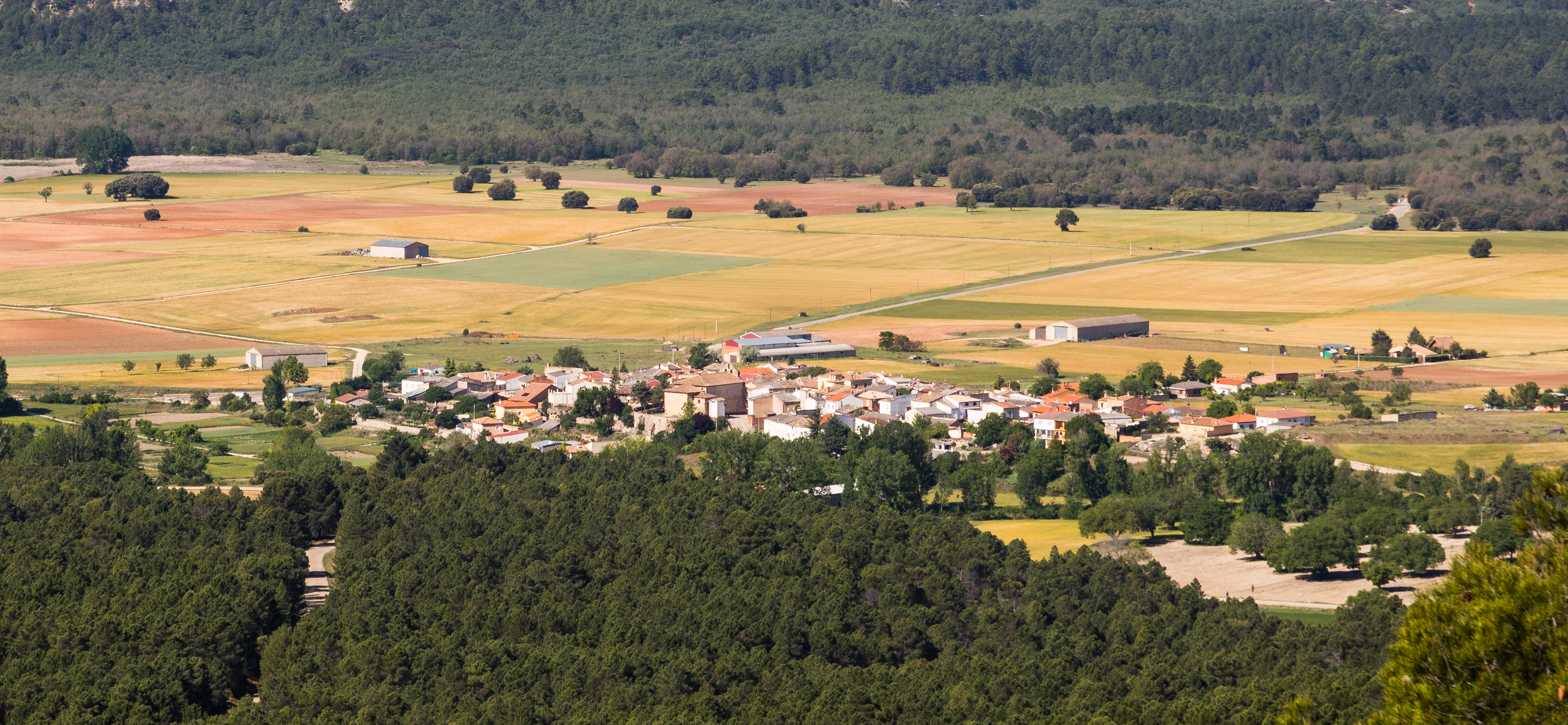

- Coat of arms

- Location within Spain Location within Castilla-La Mancha
- Coordinates: 40°33′N 2°20′W
- Country: Spain
- Autonomous community: Castile-La Mancha
- Province: Cuenca

Government
  - Mayor: Juan Carlos Aragón Corredor

Area
  - Total: 39.5 km^{2} (15.3 sq mi)
- Elevation: 851 m (2,792 ft)

Population (2025-01-01)
  - Total: 59
  - Density: 1.5/km^{2} (3.9/sq mi)
- Time zone: UTC+1 (CET)
  - Summer (DST): UTC+2 (CEST)
- Postal code: 16812

Alcantud is a municipality in Cuenca, Castile-La Mancha, Spain. It had a population of 48 as of 2020.
