= Loutrochori, Pella =

Loutrochori Λουτροχώρι
- Community
- Panoramic view of Loutrochori in May 2004.

- Location within Greece
- Coordinates: 40°43′N 22°06′E
- Country: Greece
- Administrative region: Central Macedonia
- Regional unit: Pella
- Municipality: Skydra
- Municipal unit: Skydra
- Elevation: 90 m (300 ft)

Population (2021)
  - Community: 399
- Time zone: UTC+2 (EET)
  - Summer (DST): UTC+3 (EEST)
- Postal code: 585 00
- Area code: 23810
- Vehicle registration: ΕΕ

Loutrochori(on) (Greek: Λουτροχώρι(οv) meaning "bath town"; formerly Paina, Πάινα and Bania, Μπάνια meaning "baths") is a village in the Pella regional unit, of Macedonia in Greece. Previously part of the community of Petraia, it became a separate community in 2020. According to the 2021 census, it has a population of 399. The village is on a hill and thus it has a view of the surrounding countryside.

Loutrochori is situated 30 kilometres (19 miles) north of the A2 motorway (Egnatia Odos, or A2, the Greek part of the E90) and 10 km (6 mi) south of the EO2 (or E 86). The nearest railroad (train) stations, on the OSE's Thessaloniki–Bitola railway, are 3 km (2 mi) east (Petraia), 8 km (5 mi) southeast (Episkopi) and 9 km (6 mi) northeast (Skydra). The Loutrochori area was famous from ancient times for its spa. The spa (iamatica loutra, ιαματικά λουτρά) of Loutrochori (spa-drinking therapy) is situated just 0.5 km (0.3 mi) away near the local mountain of Canber (358 m or 1,175 ft).

== History ==
=== Ancient era ===
The Loutrochori area has been a spa from the 4th century BC under the Macedonian Kingdom.

=== Modern era ===
Modern Loutrochori is a relatively new village; it was founded in the 1920s by the first Greek refugees from Pontus, under the name "Μπάνια" (Bania). After the Greek Genocide and the Greco-Turkish War (1919-1922), a large number of Pontic Greek refugees arrived at the village as a result of the population exchange under the Treaty of Lausanne. In 1926, the village's name was changed to "Λουτροχώρι" (Loutrochori).

== Demographics ==
Census	Population
1913	23
1920	56
1928	165
1940	323
1951	367
1961	435
1971	391
1981	739
1991	483
2001	466
2011	458
2021	399

The village's population grew rapidly after 1923. After the Second World War and the Greek Civil War, the population steadily declined as residents moved to larger towns and cities or emigrated.

The inhabitants are (100%) ethnic Greeks and Greek Orthodox Christians.

== Geography ==
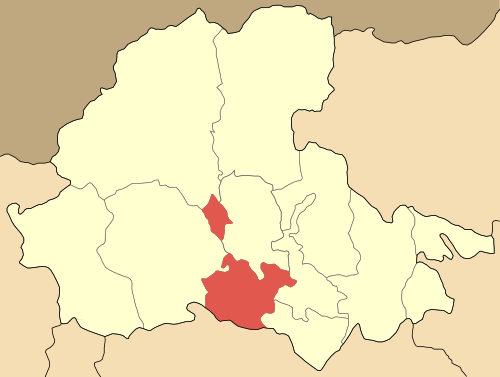
Loutrochori in the Pella regional unit

Loutrochori is the southwestern part of the municipality of Skydra. It is 21 kilometres (13 miles) southeast of the regional unit capital of Edessa in Central part of Macedonia in Greece. Loutrochori is bounded by the Imathia to the southwest and it is 28 kilometres (17 miles) northwest of the Imathian capital Veria. It sits at an elevation of around 90 metres (295 feet) above mean sea level and the population is approximately from 500 (in winter) to 800 (in summer) inhabitants.

Loutrochori covers an area of some 7.506 km^{2} (2.898 sq mi), between the mountains Vermio (2,052 m or 6,732 ft) to the southwest, Voras (2,524 m or 8,281 ft) to the northwest and Paiko (1,650 m or 5,410 ft) to the northeast.

Loutrochori is located at a distance of 533 kilometres (331 miles) northwest of the present day Greek capital - Athens by road, 44 km (27 miles) north of the royal capital of ancient Macedon - Vergina, 40 km (25 miles) west of the first capital of the Greek Macedonian Kingdom and birthplace of Alexander the Great - Pella and 82 km (51 miles) northwest of Thessaloniki, the present-day capital of Greek Macedonia.

=== Locations and distance ===
==== Nearest places ====
Place - Regional unit		km - nm	
Plevroma	Pella	2.5	1.6
Polla Nera	Imathia	3.0	1.9
Petraia	Pella	3.5	2.2
Rizo	Pella	3.8	2.4
Arseni	Pella	4.8	3.0
Marina	Imathia	6.7	4.2
Episkopi	Imathia	7.4	4.6
Kesariana	Pella	7.4	4.6
Sevastiana	Pella	8.1	5.0
Skydra	Pella	8.8	5.5

==== Big cities ====
Cities	km - nm	
Naousa	21	13
Edessa	21	13
Veria	28	17
Giannitsa	32	20
Thessaloniki	82	51
Kozani	85	53
Larissa	185	115
Kavala	228	142
Athens	533	331
Constantinople	670	416

=== Climate ===
Loutrochori, Pella

Climate chart (precipitation, max. and min. temperature)
J	F	M	A	M	J	J	A	S	O	N	D
43 7 1	51 9 3	45 14 6	35 18 8	41 24 12	28 29 17	27 31 19	23 32 18	34 27 15	39 22 12	51 14 6	53 8 3
- █ Average max. and min. temperatures in °C
- █ Precipitation totals in mm
- Source: Met Office<
Imperial conversion
J	F	M	A	M	J	J	A	S	O	N	D
1.7 45 34	2 48 37	1.8 57 43	1.4 64 46	1.6 75 54	1.1 84 63	1.1 88 66	0.9 90 64	1.3 81 59	1.5 72 54	2 57 43	2.1 46 37
- █ Average max. and min. temperatures in °F
- █ Precipitation totals in inches

The average temperature is 14.8 degrees Celsius and the average rainfall about 470 millimetres per year.

Loutrochori has a Mediterranean climate with mild, rainy winters and hot, dry summers. The warmest month is August, with 18 to 32 °C (64 to 90 °F). Record high temperatures of up to 42 °C (108 °F). The coolest month is January, averaging 1 to 7 °C (34 to 45 °F).

== Economy ==
Loutrochori produces cherries, apples, some strawberries and peaches.

== Gallery ==
=== Churches and Chapels in Loutrochori ===
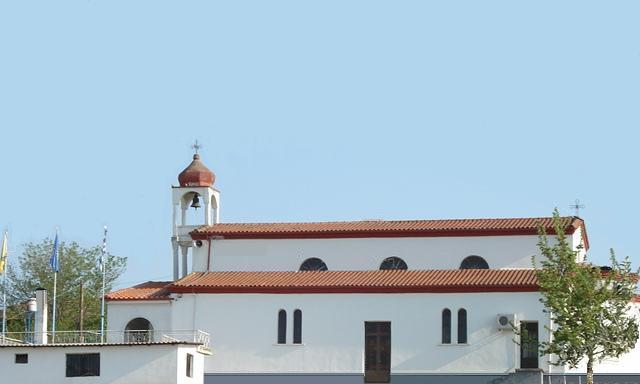
Agii Pantes (All Saints) Greek Orthodox Church in Loutrochori.

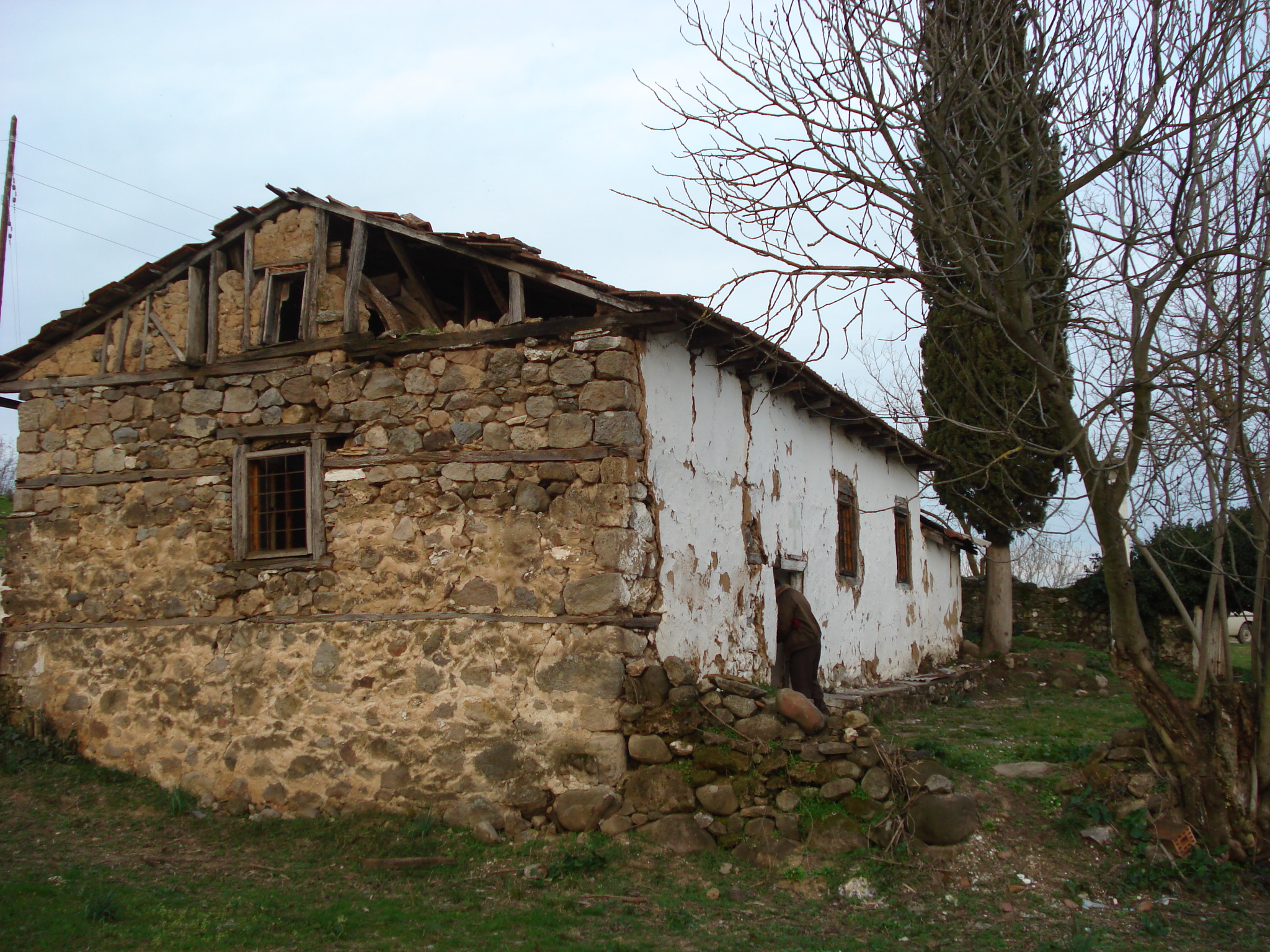
Ruins of Agios Georgios (Saint George) Greek (Byzantine) Orthodox country Church in Loutrochori.

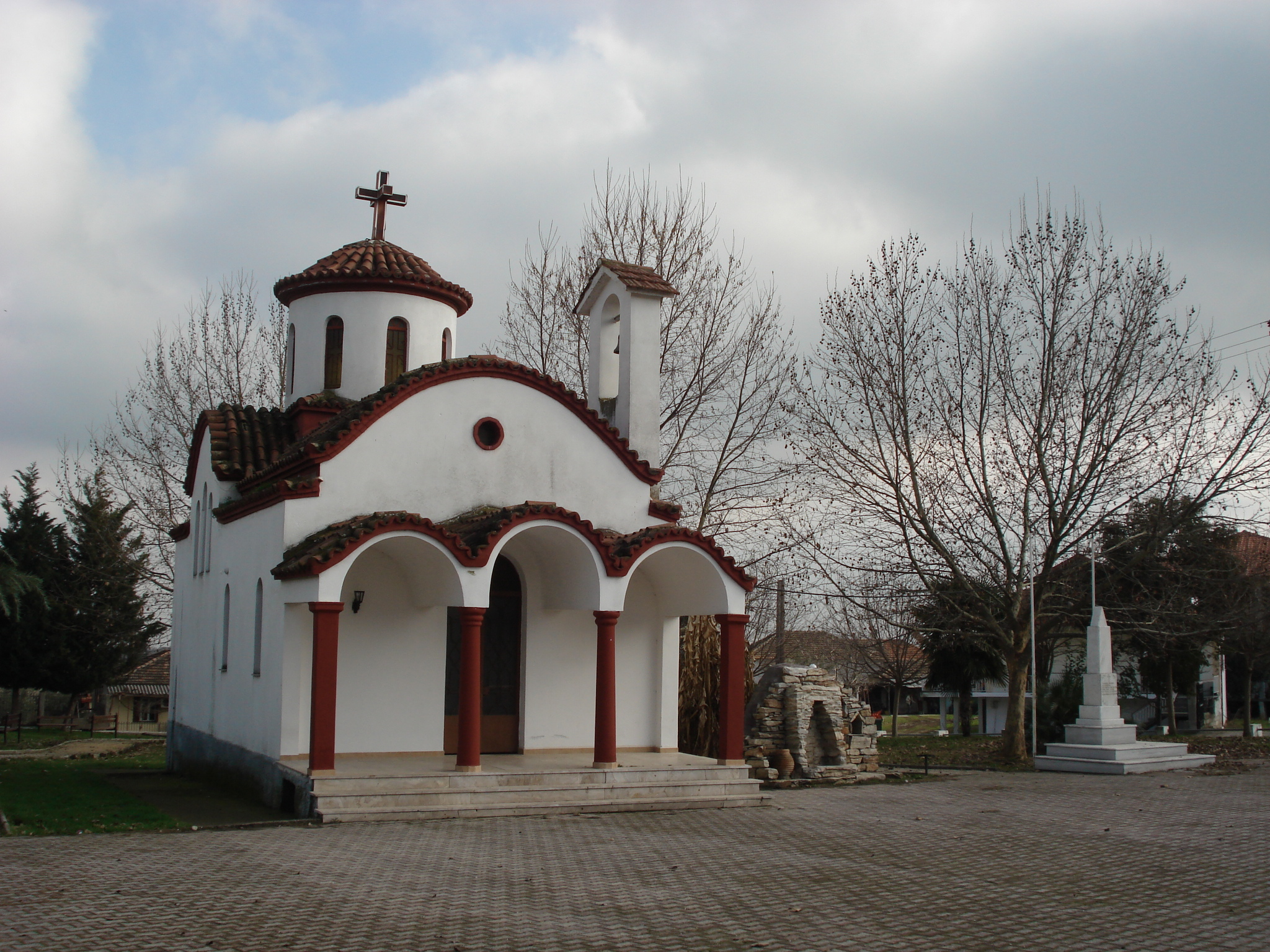
Analipseos Tou Kiriou (Ascension of Jesus) Greek Orthodox chapel in Loutrochori.

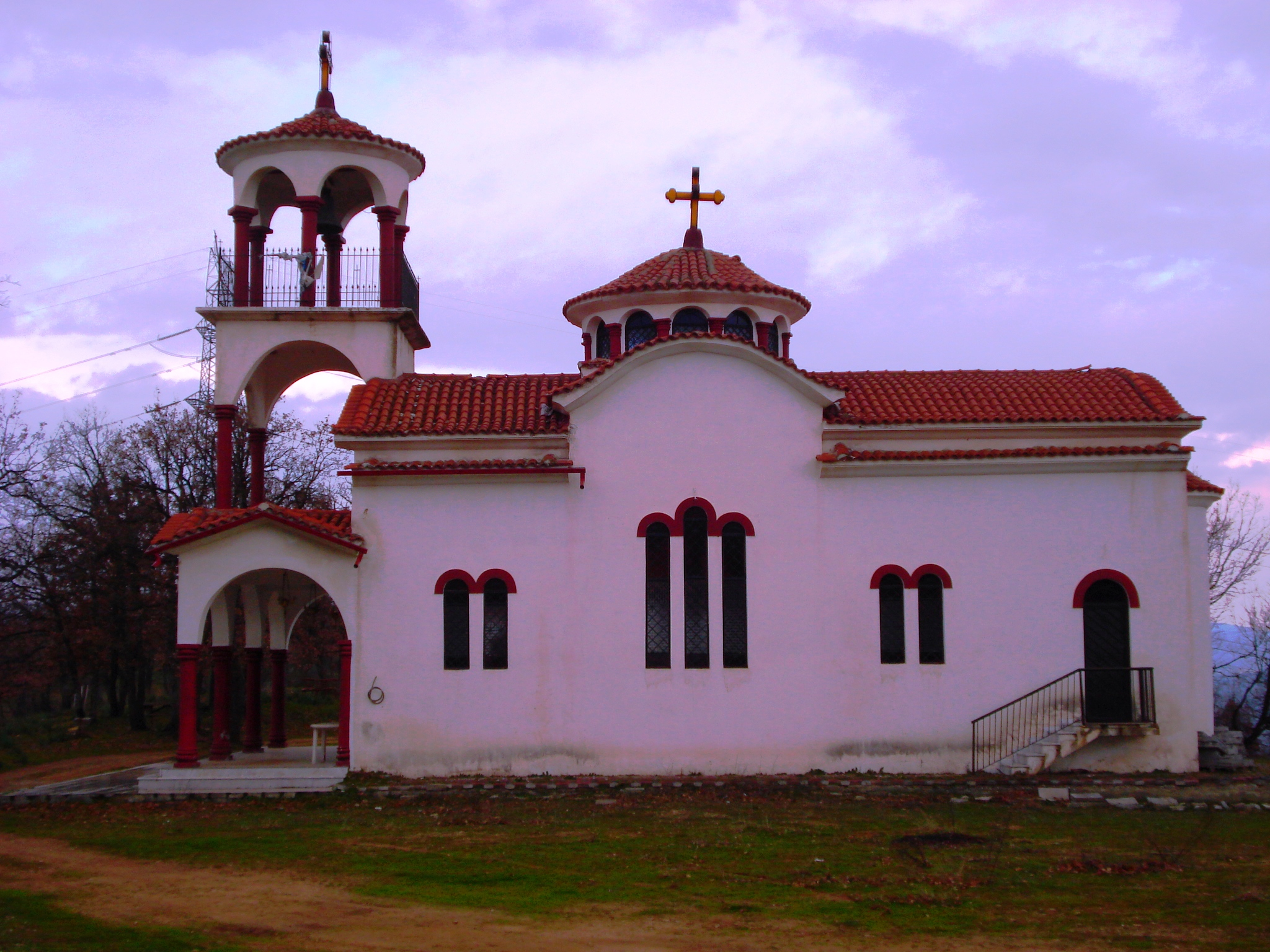
Profitis Ilias (Prophet Elias) Greek Orthodox Church in Loutrochori.
