= Bad Kreuzen =

- Municipality
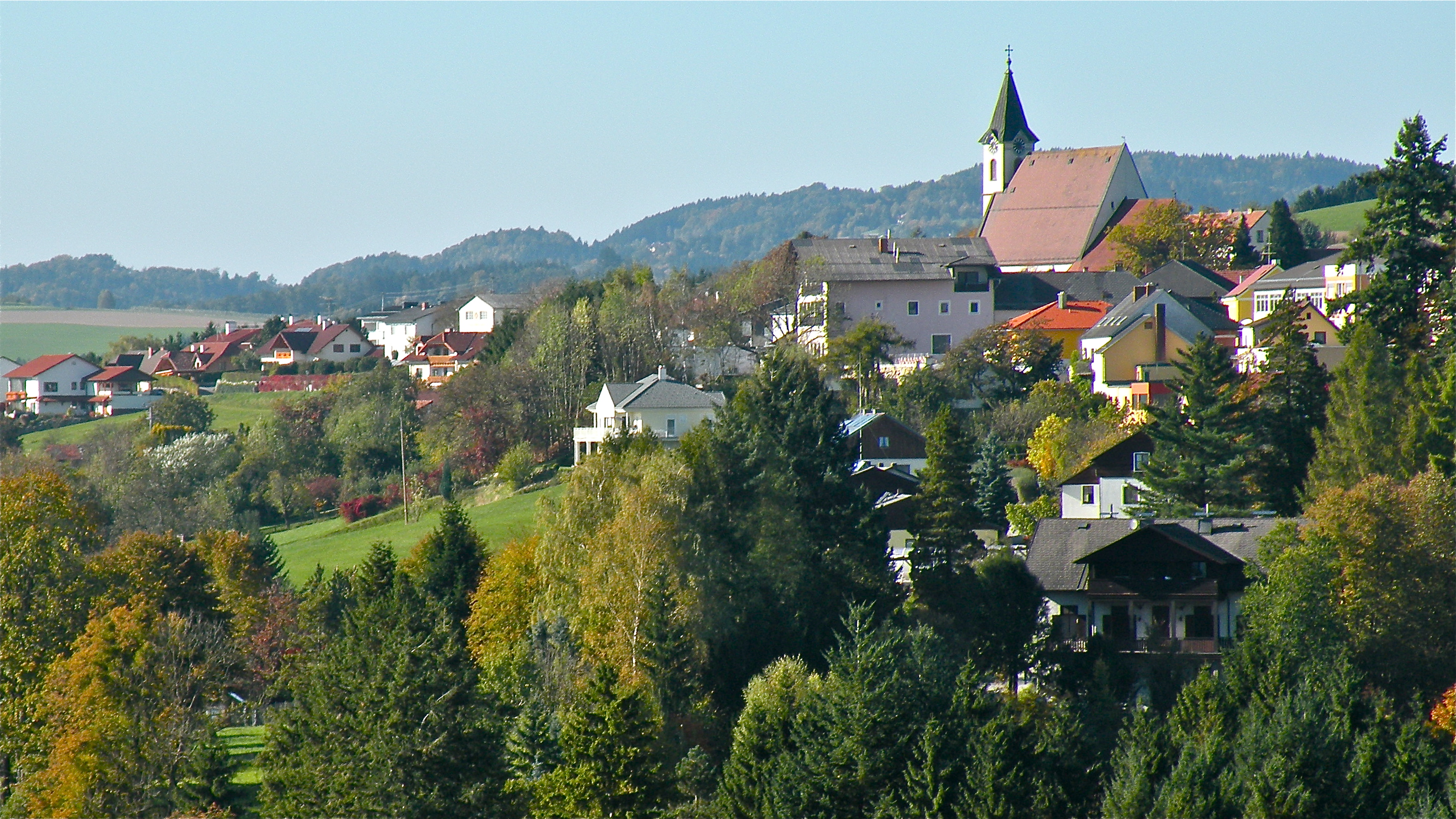
- Bad Kreuzen

- Coat of arms

- Location within Austria
- Coordinates: 48°16′00″N 14°48′23″E
- Country: Austria
- State: Upper Austria
- District: Perg

Government
  - Mayor: Manfred Nenning (ÖVP)

Area
  - Total: 39.9 km^{2} (15.4 sq mi)
- Elevation: 474 m (1,555 ft)

Population (2018-01-01)
  - Total: 2,266
  - Density: 56.8/km^{2} (147/sq mi)
- Time zone: UTC+1 (CET)
  - Summer (DST): UTC+2 (CEST)
- Postal code: 4362
- Area code: 07266
- Vehicle registration: PE
- Website: www.bad-kreuzen.at

Bad Kreuzen is a municipality in the district Perg in the Austrian state of Upper Austria.

== History ==
The area around Kreuzen is said to have been cleared by Slavs between the 8th and 11th centuries, and the name Kreuzen is partly interpreted in Slavic terms. In 1147 Otto von Machland donated his clearing parish - Kreuzen - to the Augustinian canons of Waldhausen, which he founded.

== Geography ==
Bad Kreuzen lies 7 km north of the Danube near Grein. About 29 percent of the municipality is forest, and 65 percent is farmland.
