= Moorbad Gmös =

Coordinates: 47°58′16.2″N 13°51′22.9″E

The peat therapy resort Moorbad Gmös in the vicinity of the town of Laakirchen (situated on the edge of the Salzkammergut) is one of the few bogs in the Alpine foothills of Upper Austria. The bog dates back to the Mindel glaciation and was created by a "dead-ice hole". In 1987, the local authorities of Upper Austria declared the area of 3.4 ha of the Gmöser Moor a natural preserve. A path around the area has since then given the visitor the opportunity of observing rare flora and fauna. In 2002 the spa was chosen as background scenery for the TV-production Schlosshotel Orth.

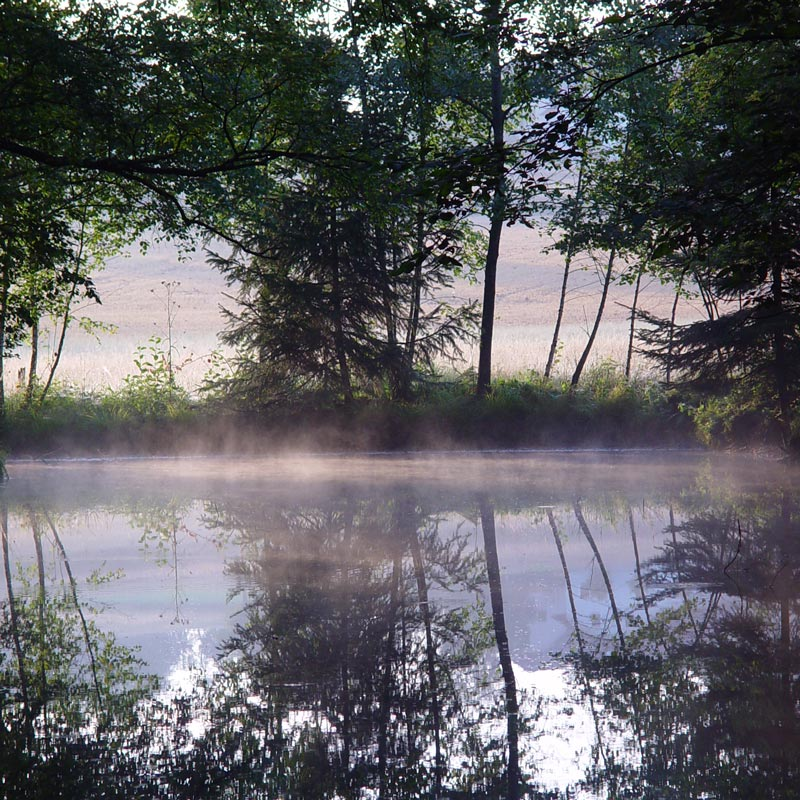
The bog pond behind the spa

== About the area ==
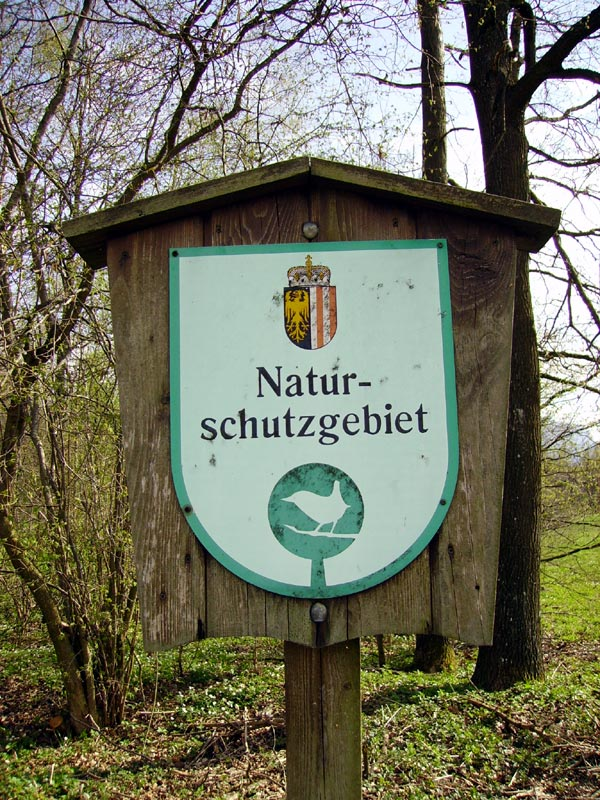

The habitat was formed on a moraine of the Mindel glaciation and forms one of the few bogs in the Alpine foothills on the east side of the Traun River. Up to the time that humans began to interfere with nature, a bog landscape with its variety of flora and fauna was able to develop. Due to cultivation of the bog landscape by man (drainage, peat-working, litter-harvesting etc.) the 3.4 ha Gmöser Moor can today be designated as a carr or fen which the original forms of flora and fauna have survived.

This was the reason that the Gmöser Moor was declared to be a natural preserve in 1987.

=== Fauna ===
Due to the number of animals – of which some are severely endangered and all under protection – the Gmöser Moor represents a unique refuge and environment in form of a biotope for the region. For example, there are amphibians such as yellow-bellied toads (Bombina variegata) – decidedly water inhabitants – and reptiles such as the grass snake (Natrix natrix) which live in damp forests, fens and bogs.

A great number of bird species find the best conditions for breeding and have been observed for a number of years.

The fieldfare (Turdus pilaris) is to be found her with the only breeding colony of the whole area.

The marsh warbler (Acrocephalus palustris) is not solely bound to reed landscapes, but is mainly to be found in bushy areas. It is a summer guest for us and spends the winter in Africa.

The whinchat (Saxicola rubetra) can be found in the surrounding meadows, as it is a typical meadow bird, which breeds on the ground. In the surroundings of the Gmöser Moor this bird could only be observed one or two times when breeding. The whinchat is also a summer guest in Austria and spends the winter in Africa

The Eurasian nuthatch (Sitta europaea) remains with us all year round. It breeds in caves and draws the observer's attention to itself by being able to crawl headfirst down trees.

The golden oriole (Oriolus oriolus) only visits as a summer guest at the end of April on its return journey from Africa. It only breeds irregularly in Gmös, whereby its nest is strictly obscured high up in the trees. The male bird can be easily recognized by its bright yellow and black feathers.

The common kestrel (Falco tinnunculus) can be observed over all open areas with flat wings spread and then pouncing down with closed wings on its prey of mice or other small mammals.

Other observed bird species:

Mallard (Anas platyrhynchos), grey partridge (Perdix perdix), pheasant (Phasianus colchicus), quail (Coturnix coturnix), moorhen (Gallinula chloropus), wood pigeon (Columba palumbus), great spotted woodpecker (Dendrocopos major), skylark (Alauda arvensis), wren (Troglodytes troglodytes), robin (Erithacus rubecula), black redstart (Phoenicurus ochruros), blackbird (Turdus merula), song thrush (Turdus philomelos), garden warbler (Sylvia borin), blackcap (Sylvia atricapilla), willow warbler (Phylloscopus trochilus), chiffchaff (Phylloscopus collybita), goldcrest (Regulus regulus), common firecrest (Regulus ignicapillus), spotted flycatcher (Muscicapa striata), marsh tit (Poecile palustris), blue tit (Parus caeruleus), great tit (Parus major), coal tit (Periparus ater), short-toed treecreeper (Certhia brachydactyla), starling (Sturnus vulgaris), Eurasian jay (Garrulus glandarius), European magpie (Pica pica), carrion crow (Corvus corone), tree sparrow (Passer montanus), house sparrow (Passer domesticus), common chaffinch (Fringilla coelebs), greenfinch (Carduelis chloris), goldfinch (Carduelis carduelis), yellowhammer (Emberiza citrinella) und reed bunting (Emberiza schoeniclus).

==== Migrants, former breeding birds and guests ====
Grey heron (Ardea cinerea), white stork (Ciconia ciconia), garganey (Anas querquedula), tufted duck (Aythya fuligula), red kite (Milvus milvus), hen harrier (Circus cyaneus), Eurasian sparrowhawk (Accipiter nisus), goshawk (Accipiter gentilis), European honey buzzard (Pernis apivorus), buzzard (Buteo buteo), hobby (Falco subbuteo), lapwing (Vanellus vanellus), curlew (Numenius arquata), green sandpiper (Tringa ochropus), Eurasian woodcock (Scolopax rusticola), common snipe (Gallinago gallinago), collared dove (Streptopelia decaocto), cuckoo (Cuculus canorus), long-eared owl (Asio otus), tawny owl (Strix aluco), common swift (Apus apus), hoopoe (Upupa epops), grey-headed woodpecker (Picus canus), European green woodpecker (Picus viridis), barn swallow (Hirundo rustica), house martin (Delichon urbica), tree pipit (Anthus trivialis), dunnock (Prunella modularis), redstart (Phoenicurus phoenicurus), wheatear (Oenanthe oenanthe), redwing (Turdus iliacus), mistle thrush (Turdus viscivorus), sedge warbler (Acrocephalus schoenobaenus), aquatic warbler (Acrocephalus paludicola), reed warbler (Acrocephalus scirpaceus), icterine warbler (Hippolais icterina), lesser whitethroat (Sylvia curruca), whitethroat (Sylvia communis), wood warbler (Phylloscopus sibilatrix), pied flycatcher (Ficedula hypoleuca), collared flycatcher (Ficedula albicollis), crested tit (Lophophanes cristatus), long-tailed tit (Aegithalos caudatus), red-backed shrike (Lanius collurio), jackdaw (Corvus monedula), common raven (Corvus corax), brambling (Fringilla montifringilla), hawfinch (Coccothraustes coccothraustes), serin (Serinus serinus), siskin (Carduelis spinus), bullfinch (Pyrrhula pyrrhula), linnet (Carduelis cannabina), common rosefinch (Carpodacus erythrinus) and common crossbill (Loxia curvirostra).

The manifold biotope structures and the special climate features which are prevalent in a bog landscape result in an extremely diverse insect world, which serves as a food source for the birds of the area.

In the area where peat is dug, one can observe the most different sorts of dragonflies and a great number of mosquitos (Culicidadae).

=== Flora ===
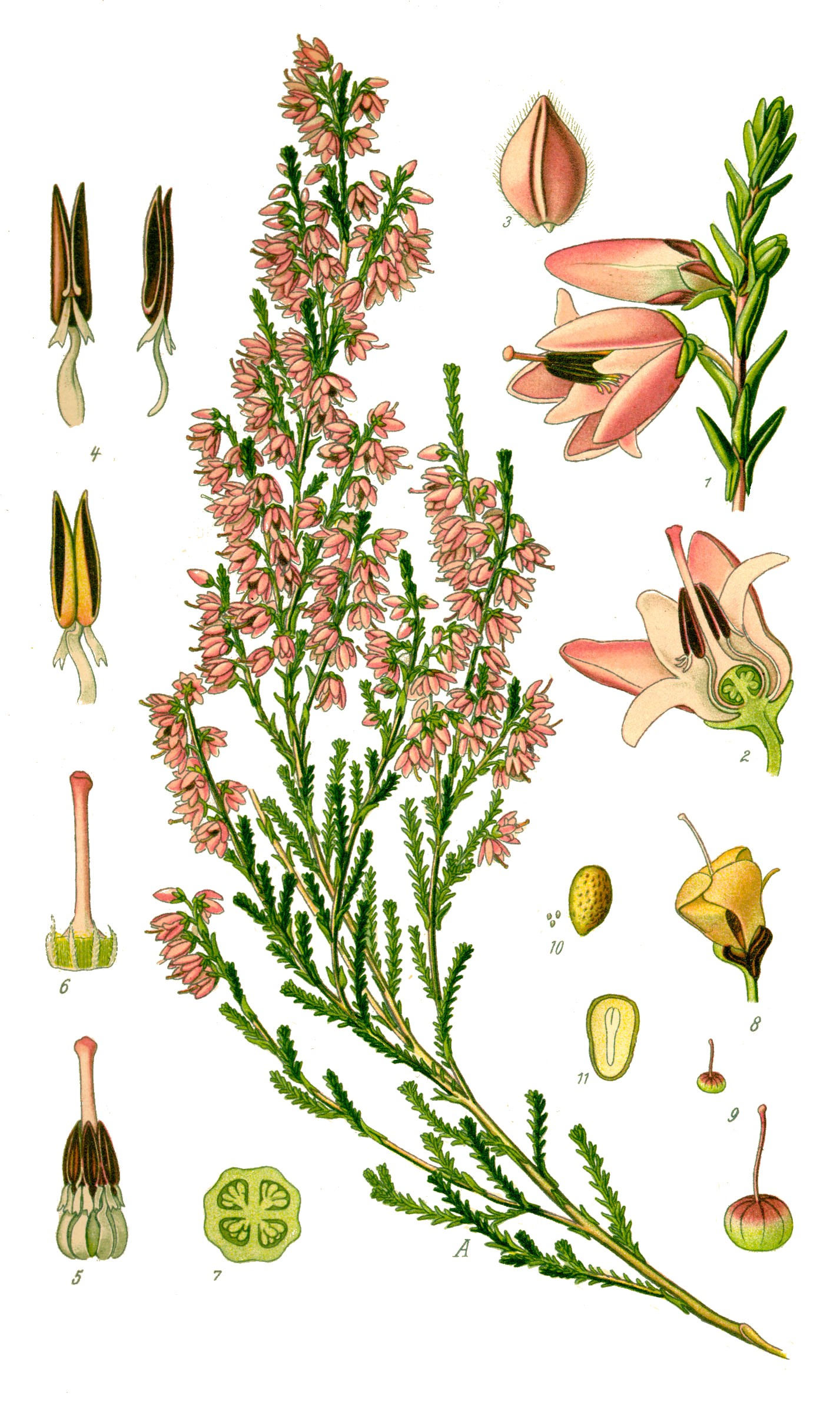
European heather

The vegetation of the bog landscape is dominated mainly by carr forests dominated by bog birch trees. Here one can observe the remnants of a great number of plants which are typical of bogland areas. Among these are the downy birch (Betula pubescens), European heather (Calluna vulgaris), milk parsley (Peucedanum palustre), blanket mire (Eriophorum vaginatum) and common sedge (Carex nigra).

Peat diggings can be found both in the centre and on the edges of the bog. The older sites are covered with marsh moss, whereas others can be identified by their duckweed, marsh cinquefoil and sparganium growth.

Peat moss

Peat moss (Sphagnum sp.) is an excellent water store. They die off at the point where they stand in water and continue growing above this point. The underlying dead particles are continually compressed downwards by the new growth from above. Thus, over a period of several ten thousands of centuries, provided that the climate and environmental conditions are in order, smaller or larger layers of peat are created. The peat layer in Gmös is, however, not exceptionally thick, as the peat mosses could not compete with the pressure applied and could therefore not turn into an ombrotrophic bog.

On the pond within the bog landscape a widespread reed-cultivation has developed.

== The peat pulp resort ==
=== History of the spa in Gmös ===
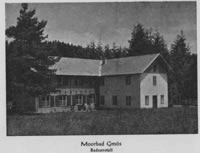

Around 1900 Johann Vizithum – a farmer in the neighbouring village of Rahstorf – used to dig peat in order to obtain fuel to run his threshing machine. He had suffered over years from severe Arthritis and realised, that whenever he trod barefoot in the bog, he experienced a definite improvement of his ailments. This was the reason that the Moorbad Gmös was founded in 1907. Since that time peat has been manually dug and prepared on a daily basis. Following the applications the peat is returned to the bog.

==== Centennial ====
100 years ago – in time of the Austro-Hungarian Monarchy, when the emperor of Austria had spent his summer holidays at the spas of Karlovy Vary, Františkovy Lázně and Mariánské Lázně in the Czech Republic – even a small Upper-Austrian village got its first peat therapy spa. 1907 the first owner named the spa after his wife Cäcilia and people from all over the country came not only because of the established guest house but also because of the new bath house.
Cäcilienbad has been renamed into Moorbad Gmös, the infrastructure has been adapted to the contemporary requirements and even the methods of treatment have been improved and expanded in order to guarantee the patient's recovery.

On 11 August, an event of the Gmundner Festival is guest in Gmös for the first time. Peter Raab reads Thomas Bernhard's "Wut und Komik" in a matinee.

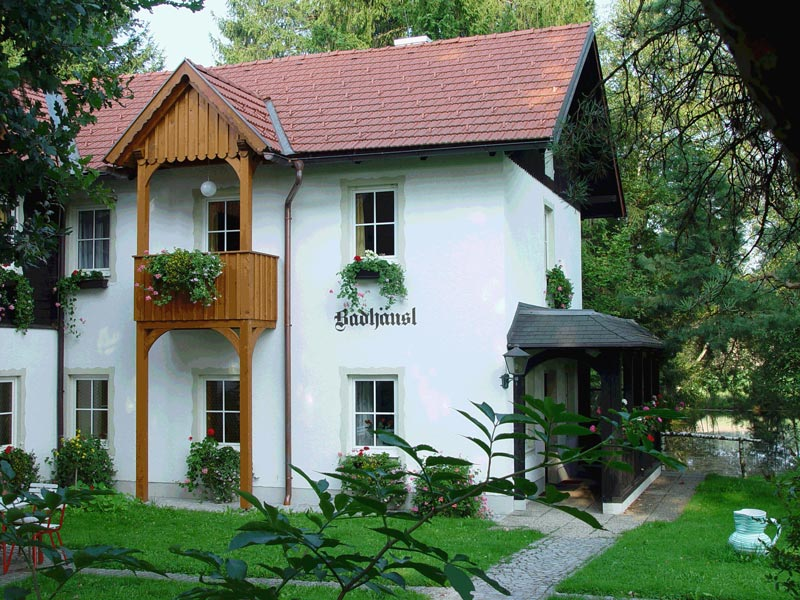
Bath house

=== The cure in the bath house ===
The traditional "cure" in Gmös is a combination of mud baths, peat-packs and massages.

==== Massages ====
Individually specified massages are essential for improving the muscular function and serve to improve all the muscular movements apparatus. Foot- and ear-reflex zone massage and special forms of traditional massage are used as supportive measures. Thus any tension and over acidification of the muscles, which often lead to pain and loss of mobility, can be treated.

==== The mud bath ====
The mud bath is prepared directly from peat taken from the bog together with bog water which is rich in content. In order to increase the typical thermal factor the water is mixed with peat.

==== Peat-packs ====
The parts if the body to be treated are covered with permeable fleece packs containing peat. According to requirement either the whole or parts of the body are then wrapped and subjected to a 50-minute cleansing procedure.

==== Indications ====
The cure is said to help with rheumatism, lumbago, sciatica, gout, all wear symptoms of the joints and the spine, chronic arthritis, the symptoms following broken bones and all over-tension of the muscles.

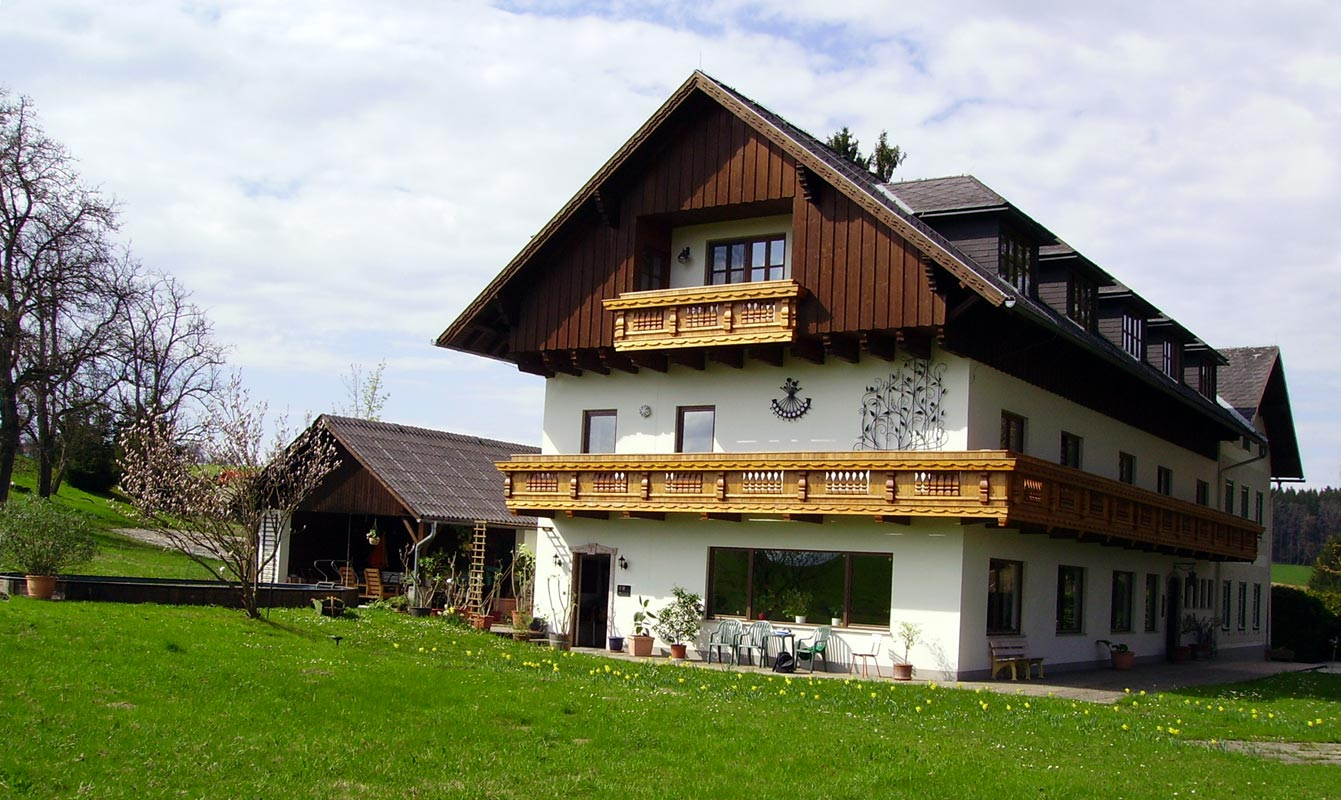
Guest house

=== Guest house ===
The guest house is in the direct vicinity of the bath-house, in order to offer those guests who do not live near the possibility of being treated. Both the guest house and the spa are family businesses, which with their maximum capacity of 16 guests, offer everybody individual treatment.

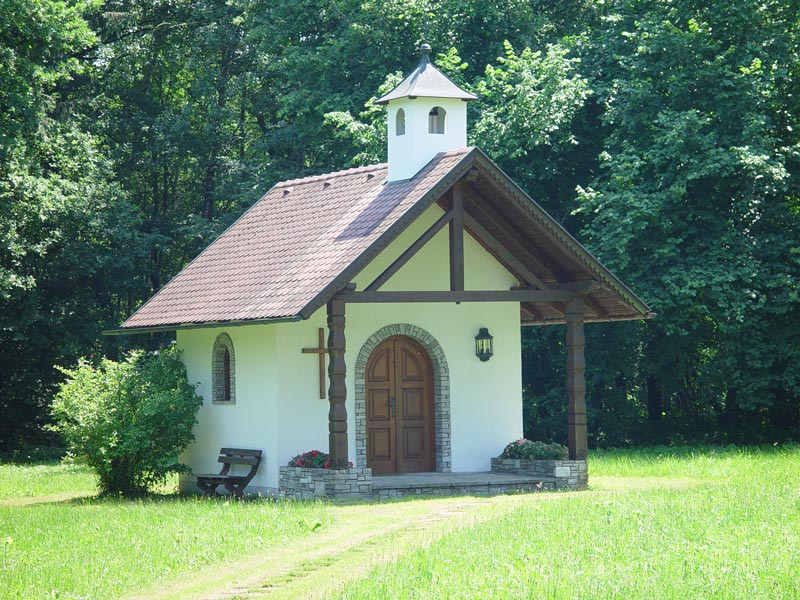
Chapel

== Chapel Gmös ==
The building of the Chapel Gmös began in 1982. After a construction period of 3 months the consecration ceremony could be carried out in the form of Mass conducted by the abbot – Mr. Siebenhütter – of the monastery in Lambach.
