= List of twin towns and sister cities in Austria =

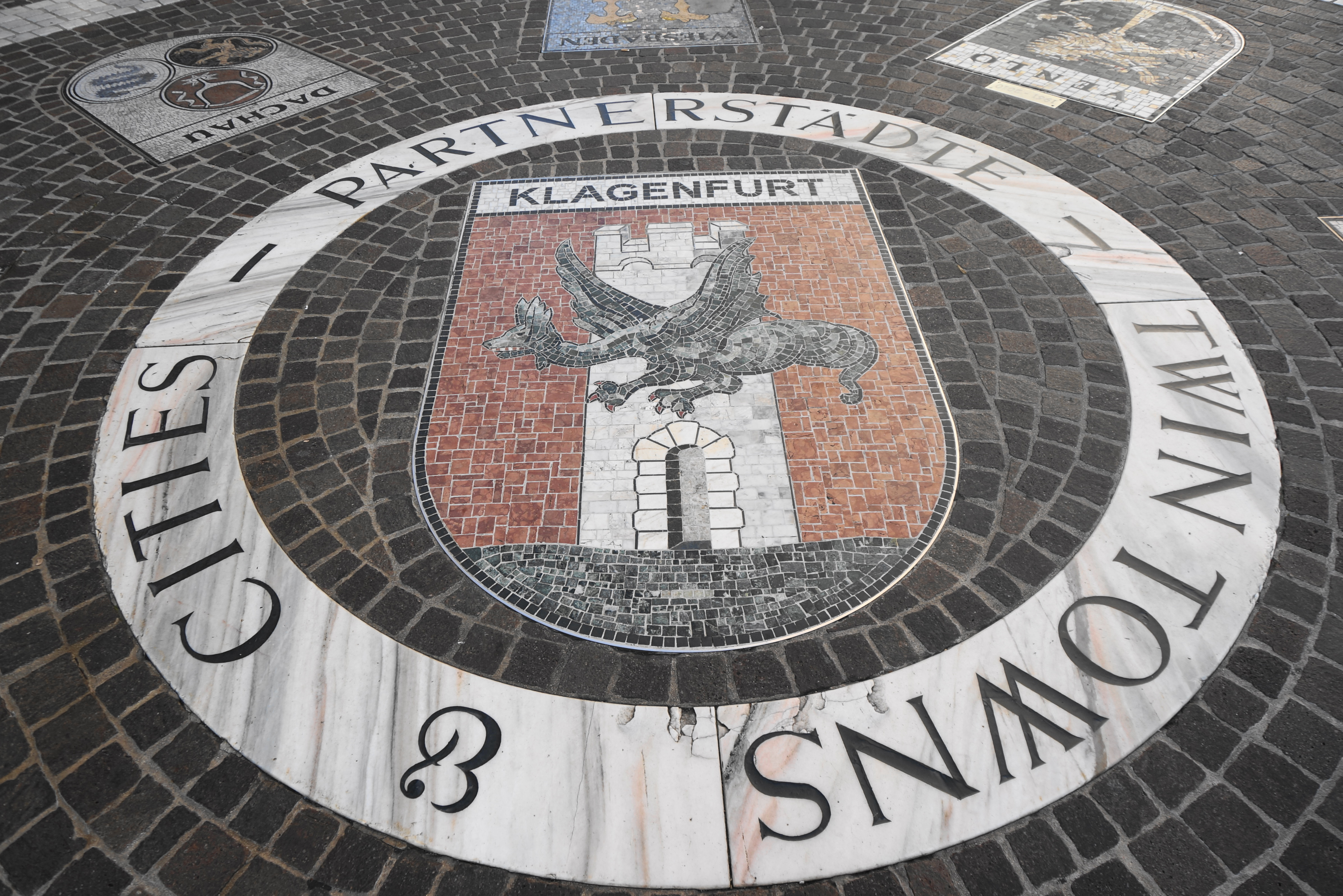
Twin towns of Klagenfurt in 2017

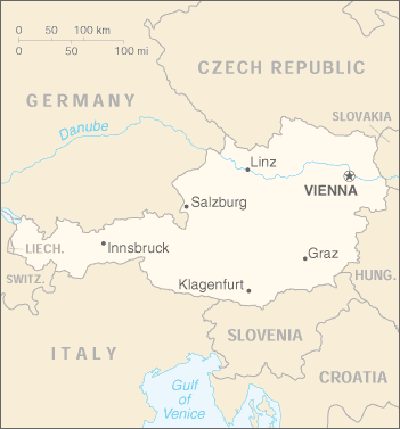
Map of Austria

This is a list of municipalities in Austria which have standing links to local communities in other countries known as "town twinning" (usually in Europe) or "sister cities" (usually in the rest of the world). Some of these partnerships have a historical background that goes back to the time of the Austrian Empire.

== A ==
Abtenau

- Big Bear Lake, United States
- Münster, Germany

Adnet

- Oppenheim, Germany

Albeck

- Fiume Veneto, Italy
- Langenau, Germany

Alberndorf im Pulkautal

- Hainburg, Germany
- Trumau, Austria
- Vernouillet, France

Alberndorf in der Riedmark

- Wackersdorf, Germany

Altmünster

- Düren, Germany

Amstetten

- Alsfeld, Germany
- Pergine Valsugana, Italy
- Ruelle-sur-Touvre, France

Anif

- Eppan an der Weinstraße, Italy

Ansfelden

- Condega, Nicaragua

Arnoldstein

- Črna na Koroškem, Slovenia
- Mežica, Slovenia
- Tarcento, Italy

Aschau im Zillertal

- Oberwil, Switzerland

Asperhofen

- Zalakaros, Hungary

Attnang-Puchheim

- Puchheim, Germany

Axams

- Rohrbach, Germany

== B ==
=== Ba–Bl ===
Bad Aussee

- Plaisir, France

Bad Großpertholz

- Lomnice nad Lužnicí, Czech Republic

Bad Ischl

- Gödöllő, Hungary
- Opatija, Croatia

Bad Mitterndorf

- Röttingen, Germany

Bad Radkersburg

- Gornja Radgona, Slovenia
- Lenti, Hungary
- Varaždin, Croatia

Bad Sauerbrunn

- Spalt, Germany

Bad Schallerbach

- Koksijde, Belgium

Bad Vöslau

- Neu-Isenburg, Germany

Bad Wimsbach-Neydharting

- Friedrichsdorf, Germany

Baumgartenberg

- Pirk, Germany

Berndorf

- Hanamaki, Japan
- Sigmundsherberg, Austria

Bischofshofen

- Unterhaching, Germany

Bleiburg

- Lovran, Croatia

Bludenz

- Borgo Valsugana, Italy
- Plettenberg, Germany

=== Br–Bu ===
Brand-Nagelberg

- Suchdol nad Lužnicí, Czech Republic

Braunau am Inn

- Lavarone, Italy

Bregenz

- Acre, Israel
- Bangor, Northern Ireland, United Kingdom

Breitenbrunn am Neusiedler See

- Breitenbrunn, Germany

Breitenwang

- Ōshū, Japan

Brixlegg

- Aichach, Germany

Bromberg

- Wilhelmshaven, Germany

Bruck an der Großglocknerstraße

- Agneaux, France
- Bad Emstal, Germany

Bruck an der Leitha

- Bruckmühl, Germany

Bruck an der Mur

- Farra d'Isonzo, Italy
- Hagen, Germany
- Liévin, France
- Veroli, Italy
- Zalalövő, Hungary

Bruckneudorf

- Hódmezővásárhely, Hungary

Burgau

- Burgau, Germany

Burgkirchen

- Füllinsdorf, Switzerland

== D ==
Deutsch Jahrndorf

- Hamuliakovo, Slovakia
- Rajka, Hungary

Deutsch-Griffen

- Utenbach (Mertendorf), Germany

Deutsch-Wagram

- Calheta de São Miguel, Cape Verde
- Gbely, Slovakia

Deutschkreuz

- Allumiere, Italy
- Nagycenk, Hungary
- Wetter, Germany

Dobersberg

- Slavonice, Czech Republic

Dornbirn

- Dubuque, United States
- Kecskemét, Hungary
- Sélestat, France

== E ==
Ebensee am Traunsee

- Prato, Italy
- Zawiercie, Poland

Eberschwang

- Kisújszállás, Hungary

Ebreichsdorf

- Šumperk, Czech Republic
- Ziębice, Poland

Eisenkappel-Vellach

- Kranj, Slovenia

Eisenstadt

- Bad Kissingen, Germany
- Colmar, France
- Goyang, South Korea
- Sanuki, Japan
- Sopron, Hungary

Eitzing

- Wald, Germany

Eltendorf

- Obergriesbach, Germany

Enns

- Dingolfing, Germany
- Zeltweg, Austria

Euratsfeld

- Strání, Czech Republic

== F ==
Falkenstein

- Blatnička, Czech Republic
- Falkenstein, Germany

Fehring

- Heinersreuth, Germany

Feistritz an der Gail

- Malborghetto Valbruna, Italy

Feistritz ob Bleiburg

- Brda, Slovenia

Feldbach

- Adelsdorf, Germany
- Siklós, Hungary
- Żywiec, Poland

Feldkirch

- Sigmaringen, Germany

Feldkirchen bei Graz

- Hennstedt, Germany

Feldkirchen in Kärnten

- Ahrensburg, Germany
- Bamberg, Germany

Ferlach

- Sponheim, Germany
- Tržič, Slovenia

Ferndorf

- Kreuztal, Germany

Finkenstein am Faaker See

- Pavia di Udine, Italy

Fischamend

- Püspökladány, Hungary

Frankenburg am Hausruck

- Vernon, Canada

Frankenfels

- Hollstadt, Germany

Freistadt

- Kaplice, Czech Republic
- Rožmberk nad Vltavou, Czech Republic

Friedberg

- Friedberg, Germany
- Söchtenau, Germany

Friesach

- Bad Griesbach, Germany
- Cormons, Italy

Frohnleiten

- Schnaittach, Germany

Fulpmes

- Villepreux, France

Fürstenfeld

- Aindling, Germany
- Körmend, Hungary
- Vişeu de Sus, Romania
- Zug, Switzerland

Furth an der Triesting

- Zubří, Czech Republic

Furth bei Gottweig

- Domažlice, Czech Republic
- Furth im Wald, Germany
- Ludres, France

== G ==
Gaal

- Gyenesdiás, Hungary

Gaflenz

- Käerjeng, Luxembourg

Gallneukirchen

- Northeim, Germany

Gaming

- Bad Sassendorf, Germany
- Groß-Siegharts, Austria

Gars am Kamp

- Gars am Inn, Germany

Gänserndorf

- Malacky, Slovakia

Glanegg

- Cassacco, Italy

Gleisdorf

- Aszófő, Hungary
- Nagykanizsa, Hungary
- Winterbach, Germany

Gmünd

- Medulin, Croatia

Gmünd in Kärnten

- Osnabrück, Germany

Gmunden

- Faenza, Italy
- Tornesch, Germany

Gols

- Rača (Bratislava), Slovakia
- Rottenburg am Neckar, Germany

Grafenegg

- Freudenberg, Germany

Grafenwörth

- Grafenwöhr, Germany
- Raiding, Austria
- Serravalle Pistoiese, Italy

Gratkorn

- Palazzolo dello Stella, Italy

Gratwein-Straßengel

- Ebrach, Germany
- Komárom, Hungary

Graz

- Coventry, England, United Kingdom
- Darmstadt, Germany
- Dubrovnik, Croatia
- Groningen, Netherlands
- Ljubljana, Slovenia
- Maribor, Slovenia
- Montclair, United States
- Pécs, Hungary
- Pula, Croatia
- Timișoara, Romania
- Trieste, Italy
- Trondheim, Norway

Grein

- Hluboká nad Vltavou, Czech Republic
- Neckarsteinach, Germany

Groß-Siegharts

- Dačice, Czech Republic
- Gaming, Austria
- Poniatowa, Poland

Grünbach am Schneeberg

- Emmerting, Germany

Gumpoldskirchen

- Leibnitz, Austria
- Vilsbiburg, Germany

Guntersdorf

- Herborn, Germany

Gurk

- Arnstadt, Germany

Güssing

- Nijlen, Belgium

== H ==
Haiming

- Oxapampa, Peru

Hainburg an der Donau

- Rodgau, Germany
- Šamorín, Slovakia

Hall in Tirol

- Iserlohn, Germany
- Sommacampagna, Italy
- Winterthur, Switzerland

Hallstatt

- Hallstadt, Germany

Hard

- Bagnoli di Sopra, Italy
- Balgach, Switzerland

Hausmannstätten

- Pécsvárad, Hungary

Heidenreichstein

- Nová Bystřice, Czech Republic

Heiligenblut am Großglockner

- Friedrichroda, Germany
- Julian, United States
- Sodankylä, Finland

Hennersdorf

- Jindřichov, Czech Republic
- Neuweiler, Germany

Hermagor-Pressegger See

- Pontebba, Italy

Himmelberg

- Bad Saulgau, Germany
- Chiusaforte, Italy

Hohenems

- Bystré, Czech Republic
- Ostfildern, Germany
- Polička, Czech Republic

Hohenzell

- Polling, Germany

Hollabrunn

- Holíč, Slovakia
- Jinhua, China
- Kyjov, Czech Republic

Hollersbach im Pinzgau

- La Gacilly, France

Horn

- Slavkov u Brna, Czech Republic

Hüttenberg

- Altmannstein, Germany

== I ==
Imst

- Rottweil, Germany

Innsbruck

- Aalborg, Denmark
- Freiburg im Breisgau, Germany
- Grenoble, France
- Kraków, Poland
- New Orleans, United States
- Sarajevo, Bosnia and Herzegovina
- (Georgia (country)) Tbilisi, Georgia

Ischgl

- Schengen, Luxembourg

== J ==
Jenbach

- Posina, Italy

Judenburg is a member of the Douzelage, a town twinning association of towns across the European Union. Judenburg also has one other twin town.

Douzelage

- Agros, Cyprus
- Altea, Spain
- Asikkala, Finland
- Bad Kötzting, Germany
- Bellagio, Italy
- (Republic of Ireland) Bundoran, Ireland
- Chojna, Poland
- Granville, France
- Holstebro, Denmark
- Houffalize, Belgium
- Kőszeg, Hungary
- Marsaskala, Malta
- Meerssen, Netherlands
- Niederanven, Luxembourg
- Oxelösund, Sweden
- Preveza, Greece
- Rokiškis, Lithuania
- Rovinj, Croatia
- Sesimbra, Portugal
- Sherborne, England, United Kingdom
- Sigulda, Latvia
- Siret, Romania
- Škofja Loka, Slovenia
- Sušice, Czech Republic
- Tryavna, Bulgaria
- Türi, Estonia
- Zvolen, Slovakia

Other

- Massa e Cozzile, Italy

== K ==
Kalwang

- Bő, Hungary

Kapfenberg

- Frechen, Germany

Karlstetten

- Pleiskirchen, Germany

Kautzen

- Moravské Budějovice, Czech Republic

Keutschach am See

- Medea, Italy
- Šempeter-Vrtojba, Slovenia

Kindberg

- Roßdorf, Germany
- Vösendorf, Austria

Kirchbach

- Gárdony, Hungary
- Paularo, Italy

Kitzbühel

- Bad Soden, Germany
- Greenwich, United States
- Rueil-Malmaison, France
- Sterzing, Italy
- Sun Valley, United States
- Yamagata, Japan

Klagenfurt

- Chernivtsi, Ukraine
- Dachau, Germany
- Dessau-Roßlau, Germany
- Dushanbe, Tajikistan
- Gladsaxe, Denmark
- Gorizia, Italy
- Laval, Canada
- Nanning, China
- Nof HaGalil, Israel
- Nova Gorica, Slovenia
- Rzeszów, Poland
- Sibiu, Romania
- Tarragona, Spain
- Wiesbaden, Germany
- Zalaegerszeg, Hungary

Klein Sankt Paul

- Colloredo di Monte Albano, Italy

Klosterneuburg

- Göppingen, Germany

Knittelfeld

- Barcs, Hungary
- Kameoka, Japan

Köflach

- Giengen an der Brenz, Germany

Königsdorf

- Königsdorf, Germany

Kopfing im Innkreis

- Aidenbach, Germany
- Ringelai, Germany

Koppl

- Zirndorf, Germany

Kramsach

- Azumino, Japan

Kraubath an der Mur

- Koszęcin, Poland

Krems an der Donau

- Beaune, France
- Böblingen, Germany
- Esbjerg, Denmark
- Grapevine, United States
- Kroměříž, Czech Republic
- Passau, Germany

Krenglbach

- Császártöltés, Hungary

Krumpendorf am Wörthersee

- Gyula, Hungary
- Pamhagen, Austria

Kuchl

- San Giovanni al Natisone, Italy

Kufstein

- Frauenfeld, Switzerland
- Langenlois, Austria
- Rovereto, Italy

== L ==
Laa an der Thaya

- Garching an der Alz, Germany
- Świętochłowice, Poland

Laakirchen

- Gemona del Friuli, Italy
- Obertshausen, Germany

Lambach

- Reichenschwand, Germany

Langenwang

- Nittendorf, Germany

Lannach

- Alling, Germany

Lassee is a member of the Charter of European Rural Communities, a town twinning association across the European Union, alongside with:

- Bienvenida, Spain
- Bièvre, Belgium
- Bucine, Italy
- (Republic of Ireland) Cashel, Ireland
- Cissé, France
- Desborough, England, United Kingdom
- Esch (Haaren), Netherlands
- Hepstedt, Germany
- Ibănești, Romania
- Kandava (Tukums), Latvia
- Kannus, Finland
- Kolindros, Greece
- Medzev, Slovakia
- Næstved, Denmark
- Nagycenk, Hungary
- Nadur, Malta
- Ockelbo, Sweden
- Pano Lefkara, Cyprus
- Põlva, Estonia
- Samuel (Soure), Portugal
- Starý Poddvorov, Czech Republic
- Strzyżów, Poland
- Svoge, Bulgaria
- Tisno, Croatia
- Troisvierges, Luxembourg
- Žagarė (Joniškis), Lithuania

Laxenburg

- Gödöllő, Hungary

Lech

- Beaver Creek, United States
- Hakuba, Japan
- Kampen, Germany

Leibnitz

- Fiumicello Villa Vicentina, Italy
- Gumpoldskirchen, Austria
- Mira, Italy
- Pedra Badejo, Cape Verde

Leoben

- Xuzhou, China

Leutasch

- Hida, Japan

Leutschach an der Weinstraße

- Kungota, Slovenia

Lienz

- Gorizia, Italy
- Jackson, United States
- Selçuk, Turkey

Liezen

- Solms, Germany
- Telšiai, Lithuania

Lilienfeld

- Jōetsu, Japan
- Třebíč, Czech Republic

Linz

- Albufeira, Portugal
- Brașov, Romania
- České Budějovice, Czech Republic
- Charlottenburg-Wilmersdorf (Berlin), Germany
- Chengdu, China
- Dodoma, Tanzania
- Eskişehir, Turkey
- Gwangyang, South Korea
- Halle, Germany
- Kansas City, United States
- Linköping, Sweden
- Linz am Rhein, Germany
- Modena, Italy
- Nasushiobara, Japan
- Nizhny Novgorod, Russia
- Norrköping, Sweden
- San Carlos, Nicaragua
- Tampere, Finland
- Tuzla, Bosnia and Herzegovina
- Zaporizhia, Ukraine

Litzelsdorf

- Memmingen, Germany

Ludmannsdorf

- Monrupino, Italy

Lurnfeld

- Mariano del Friuli, Italy

== M ==
Mallnitz

- Witten, Germany

Maria Saal

- Aquileia, Italy
- Forgaria nel Friuli, Italy
- Gornji Grad, Slovenia

Maria Wörth

- Aretxabaleta, Spain
- Codroipo, Italy
- Freising, Germany

Mariapfarr

- Matadepera, Spain

Mariazell

- Altötting, Germany
- Esztergom, Hungary

Mattersburg

- Kapuvár, Hungary

Mattsee

- Bühl, Germany

Mautern in Steiermark

- Mautern an der Donau, Austria
- (Republic of Ireland) Tipperary, Ireland

Mauterndorf

- Cadolzburg, Germany

Mauthausen

- Cogollo del Cengio, Italy
- Prachatice, Czech Republic

Mayrhofen

- Bad Homburg vor der Höhe, Germany
- Cabourg, France
- Chur, Switzerland
- Mondorf-les-Bains, Luxembourg
- Terracina, Italy

Micheldorf

- Villesse, Italy

Michelhausen

- Ždírec nad Doubravou, Czech Republic

Mieming

- Limas, France

Millstatt am See

- Heligoland, Germany
- San Daniele del Friuli, Italy
- Wendlingen, Germany

Mistelbach

- Neumarkt in der Oberpfalz, Germany
- Pécel, Hungary

Mitterkirchen im Machland

- Mitterskirchen, Germany

Mittersill

- Büren, Germany
- Tricesimo, Italy

Mödling

- Dirmstein, Germany
- Esch-sur-Alzette, Luxembourg
- Kőszeg, Hungary
- Obzor (Nesebar), Bulgaria
- Offenbach am Main, Germany
- Puteaux, France
- Velletri, Italy
- Vsetín, Czech Republic
- Zemun (Belgrade), Serbia
- Zottegem, Belgium

Molln

- Buseck, Germany
- Tát, Hungary

Mondsee

- Saint-Jean-d'Angély, France

Moosburg

- Katerini, Greece
- Maintal, Germany
- Moosburg an der Isar, Germany

Murau

- Fagagna, Italy

Mürzzuschlag

- Arusha, Tanzania
- Blansko, Czech Republic
- Chillán, Chile
- Pengzhou, China
- Treptow-Köpenick (Berlin), Germany

== N ==
Neudau

- Celldömölk, Hungary

Neudörfl

- Zollikofen, Switzerland

Neuhofen an der Krems

- Gornji Vakuf-Uskoplje, Bosnia and Herzegovina
- Gusow-Platkow, Germany
- Tiszaújváros, Hungary

Neukirchen am Großvenediger

- Hünstetten, Germany

Neumarkt in der Steiermark

- Monfalcone, Italy

Neunkirchen

- Pausa-Mühltroff, Germany
- West Lindsey, England, United Kingdom

Neusiedl am See

- Deggendorf, Germany
- Mosonmagyaróvár, Hungary
- Pezinok, Slovakia

Neustift im Stubaital

- Kusatsu, Japan

Nickelsdorf

- Pusztavám, Hungary

Nötsch im Gailtal

- Buttrio, Italy

== O ==
Obdach

- Kötz, Germany
- Telšiai, Lithuania

Oberdrauburg

- Kötschach-Mauthen, Austria
- Paluzza, Italy
- Signa, Italy
- Türkenfeld, Germany

Oberndorf bei Salzburg

- Oberndorf am Neckar, Germany
- Traismauer, Austria

Obervellach

- Budapest XV (Budapest), Hungary
- Dilbeek, Belgium
- Freising, Germany
- Hemer, Germany
- Kreuzau, Germany
- Muggia, Italy
- Seltz, France
- Škofja Loka, Slovenia

Oberwart

- Szombathely, Hungary

Orth an der Donau

- Fehmarn, Germany

Ottensheim

- Furth, Germany
- Jajce, Bosnia and Herzegovina

== P ==
Parndorf

- Senec, Slovakia
- Senj, Croatia

Perchtoldsdorf

- Donauwörth, Germany

Perg

- Schrobenhausen, Germany

Pettenbach

- Tuchów, Poland

Pfaffstätten

- Alzenau, Germany

Pichl bei Wels

- Thyrnau, Germany

Pinsdorf

- Altdorf, Germany

Pöchlarn

- Riedlingen, Germany

Poggersdorf

- Sagrado, Italy
- Schwebheim, Germany

Pöls-Oberkurzheim

- Mainhausen, Germany
- Medulin, Croatia

Pöndorf

- Schwaigern, Germany

Pottendorf

- San Lorenzo Isontino, Italy

Pottenstein

- Potštejn, Czech Republic
- Pottenstein, Germany

Poysdorf

- Dettelbach, Germany

Puchenau

- Lindberg, Germany

Pulkau

- Moravské Budějovice, Czech Republic

Purbach am Neusiedlersee

- Kulmain, Germany
- Montalcino, Italy
- Teaca, Romania

Purgstall an der Erlauf

- Linden, Germany
- Machern, Germany
- Maków, Poland

Purkersdorf

- Bad Säckingen, Germany
- Sanary-sur-Mer, France

== R ==
Raabs an der Thaya

- Jemnice, Czech Republic
- Reszel, Poland

Rabensburg

- Lanžhot, Czech Republic

Radenthein

- Ampezzo, Italy
- Schorndorf, Germany

Ramsau am Dachstein

- Bohinj, Slovenia

Reichenau an der Rax

- Latisana, Italy

Reichenfels

- Aurachtal, Germany

Reith bei Kitzbühel

- Wetzlar, Germany

Retz

- Hainburg, Germany
- Rötz, Germany
- Znojmo, Czech Republic

Reutte

- Ōshū, Japan

Ried im Innkreis

- Landshut, Germany

Rohrbach bei Mattersburg

- Rohrbach, Germany

Roppen

- Forchheim, Germany

Rosegg

- Bohinj, Slovenia
- Lauco, Italy
- Osoppo, Italy
- Zuglio, Italy

Rust

- Kulmbach, Germany
- Tokaj, Hungary

== S ==
=== Sa ===
Saalbach-Hinterglemm

- Biei, Japan

Saalfelden am Steinernen Meer

- Grimbergen, Belgium
- Rankoshi, Japan
- Rödermark, Germany

Sachsenburg

- Spilimbergo, Italy

Salzburg

- Dresden, Germany
- León, Nicaragua
- Merano, Italy
- Reims, France
- Shanghai, China
- Singida, Tanzania
- Verona, Italy
- Vilnius, Lithuania

Sandl

- Rudolfov, Czech Republic

Sankt Andrä

- Jelsa, Croatia

Sankt Andrä-Wördern

- Greifenstein, Germany

Sankt Anton am Arlberg

- Nozawaonsen, Japan
- Schlanders, Italy

Sankt Georgen am Längsee

- Zoppola, Italy

Sankt Georgen am Walde

- Lalín, Spain
- Lalinde, France
- Linden, Germany
- Linden (Cuijk), Netherlands
- Lubbeek, Belgium

Sankt Jakob im Rosental

- Jesenice, Slovenia

Sankt Johann im Pongau

- Lage, Germany

Sankt Johann in Tirol

- Fuldabrück, Germany
- Redford, United States
- Rovaniemi, Finland
- Valeggio sul Mincio, Italy

Sankt Kanzian am Klopeiner See

- Divača, Slovenia
- San Canzian d'Isonzo, Italy

Sankt Lorenz

- Lőrinci, Hungary

Sankt Marein-Feistritz

- Grado, Italy

Sankt Martin am Wöllmißberg

- Unsere Liebe Frau im Walde-St. Felix, Italy

Sankt Paul im Lavanttal

- Sankt Blasien, Germany

Sankt Pölten

- Altoona, United States
- Brno, Czech Republic
- Clichy, France
- Heidenheim an der Brenz, Germany
- Kurashiki, Japan
- Wuhan, China

Sankt Ulrich bei Steyr

- Postbauer-Heng, Germany

Sankt Valentin

- Mimasaka, Japan
- Pelhřimov, Czech Republic
- Saint-Valentin, France

Sankt Veit an der Glan

- Haltern am See, Germany
- Kelmė, Lithuania
- Mainz-Kostheim (Wiesbaden), Germany
- San Vito al Tagliamento, Italy

=== Sc–Se ===
Scharnitz

- Plattling, Germany

Schenkenfelden

- Gyula, Hungary

Schiefling am Wörthersee

- Romans d'Isonzo, Italy

Schladming

- Felletin, France
- Furano, Japan
- Wetzlar, Germany

Schlierbach

- Hessisch Lichtenau, Germany
- Orgelet, France

Schönbach

- Herborn, Germany

Schrems

- Třeboň, Czech Republic

Schruns

- Myōkō, Japan

Schwaz

- Argentario (Trento), Italy
- Bourg-de-Péage, France
- East Grinstead, England, United Kingdom
- Mindelheim, Germany
- Sant Feliu de Guíxols, Spain
- Tramin an der Weinstraße, Italy
- Verbania, Italy

Schwechat

- Gladbeck, Germany
- Skalica, Slovakia

Seeboden am Millstätter See

- Saijō, Japan

Seefeld in Tirol

- Salzkotten, Germany

Seekirchen am Wallersee

- Frankenberg an der Eder, Germany

Seiersberg-Pirka

- Hausham, Germany
- Laktaši, Bosnia and Herzegovina

Semriach

- Bóly, Hungary
- Fauglia, Italy

Senftenberg

- Senftenberg, Germany
- Žamberk, Czech Republic

=== Si–St ===
Sieghartskirchen

- Bábolna, Hungary

Silz

- Oxapampa, Peru

Sittersdorf

- Piran, Slovenia

Sölden

- Minamiuonuma, Japan

Sonntagberg

- Sárvár, Hungary

Spillern

- Kanice, Czech Republic

Spittal an der Drau

- Kočevje, Slovenia
- Löhne, Germany
- Porcia, Italy
- Pordenone, Italy

Stadl-Paura

- Langenhagen, Germany

Stainz

- Schenna, Italy
- Villány, Hungary

Stams

- Kaisheim, Germany

Stans

- San Pietro in Cariano, Italy

Stegersbach

- Northampton, United States

Steuerberg

- Tavagnacco, Italy

Steyr

- Bethlehem, Palestine
- Kettering, United States
- Plauen, Germany
- San Benedetto del Tronto, Italy

Stockerau

- Andernach, Germany
- Baranovichi, Belarus
- Mosonmagyaróvár, Hungary

Straß in Steiermark

- Schwarzenfeld, Germany

== T ==
Tamsweg

- Iseo, Italy

Telfes im Stubai

- Freckenfeld, Germany

Telfs

- Elzach, Germany
- Lana, Italy

Thalgau

- Neu-Anspach, Germany

Thörl

- Ljubečna, Slovenia

Traismauer

- Aytos, Bulgaria
- Oberndorf bei Salzburg, Austria

Traun

- Forlimpopoli, Italy

Treffen am Ossiacher See

- Capriva del Friuli, Italy
- Öhringen, Germany

Trofaiach

- (Republic of Ireland) Clonmel, Ireland
- Kamnik, Slovenia

Trumau

- Alberndorf im Pulkautal, Austria
- Hainburg, Germany
- Vernouillet, France

Tschagguns

- Myōkō, Japan

== U ==
Ulrichsberg

- Baiersdorf, Germany
- Horní Planá, Czech Republic

Umhausen

- Erlangen, Germany

Ungenach

- Bischofsmais, Germany

== V ==
Velden am Wörther See

- Bled, Slovenia
- Gemona del Friuli, Italy

Vienna – as a general rule, Vienna is twinned to no other city in the world, and has only cooperation agreements on specific issues limited in time.

Vienna 1 – Innere Stadt

- Budavár (Budapest), Hungary
- Old Town (Bratislava), Slovakia
- Prague 1 (Prague), Czech Republic
- Shapingba (Chongqing), China
- Śródmieście (Warsaw), Poland
- Taitō (Tokyo), Japan

Vienna 2 – Leopoldstadt

- Brooklyn (New York), United States

Vienna 5 – Margareten

- Lichtenberg (Berlin), Germany

Vienna 9 – Alsergrund

- Dongcheng (Beijing), China
- Takarazuka, Japan
- Wenzhou, China

Vienna 11 – Simmering

- Chaoyang (Beijing), China

Vienna 12 – Meidling

- Gifu, Japan

Vienna 13 – Hietzing

- Habikino, Japan
- Tanba, Japan

Vienna 14 – Penzing

- Prague 6 (Prague), Czech Republic

Vienna 17 – Hernals

- Fuchū, Japan

Vienna 19 – Döbling

- Setagaya (Tokyo), Japan

Vienna 21 – Floridsdorf

- Budapest XIII (Budapest), Hungary
- Katsushika (Tokyo), Japan

Vienna 22 – Donaustadt

- Arakawa (Tokyo), Japan
- Huangpu (Shanghai), China

Vienna 23 – Liesing

- Budapest XV (Budapest), Hungary
- Ulcinj, Montenegro

Villach

- Bamberg, Germany
- Kranj, Slovenia
- Suresnes, France
- Tolmin, Slovenia
- Udine, Italy

Vils

- Marktredwitz, Germany

Vöcklabruck

- Český Krumlov, Czech Republic
- Hauzenberg, Germany
- Slovenj Gradec, Slovenia

Vöcklamarkt

- Mertzig, Luxembourg

Voitsberg

- Hersbruck, Germany
- Kadarkút, Hungary
- Leśnica, Poland
- San Martino Buon Albergo, Italy
- Veliko Trojstvo, Croatia

Volders

- Mühlbach, Italy

Völkermarkt

- San Giorgio di Nogaro, Italy

Vomp

- Bad Endorf, Germany
- Nazelles-Négron, France

Vösendorf

- Kindberg, Austria
- Reggello, Italy
- Roßdorf, Germany

== W ==
Wagna

- Metlika, Slovenia
- Ronchi dei Legionari, Italy

Waidhofen an der Thaya

- Heubach, Germany
- Telč, Czech Republic

Waidhofen an der Ybbs

- Battaglia Terme, Italy
- Bischofszell, Switzerland
- Freising, Germany
- Laatzen, Germany
- Tuttlingen, Germany

Wallern an der Trattnach

- Pressig, Germany
- Volary, Czech Republic
- Wallern im Burgenland, Germany

Wartberg ob der Aist

- Vodňany, Czech Republic

Weiden am See

- Weiden in der Oberpfalz, Germany

Weitensfeld im Gurktal

- Ragogna, Italy

Weiz

- Ajka, Hungary
- Grodzisk Mazowiecki, Poland
- Offenburg, Germany

Wels

- Bistrița, Romania
- Chichigalpa, Nicaragua
- Krasnodar, Russia
- Straubing, Germany
- Tábor, Czech Republic

Werfen

- Lengede, Italy

Wernberg

- Wernberg-Köblitz, Germany

Weyregg am Attersee

- Trimmis, Switzerland

Wiener Neustadt

- Desenzano del Garda, Italy
- Harbin, China
- Monheim am Rhein, Germany

Wies

- Zeulenroda-Triebes, Germany

Wieselburg

- Einbeck, Germany

Wölbling

- Bischofswiesen, Germany

Wolfern

- Taszár, Hungary

Wolfsberg

- Herzogenaurach, Germany
- Várpalota, Hungary

Wolkersdorf im Weinviertel

- Erbach an der Donau, Germany

Wörgl

- Albrechtice nad Orlicí, Czech Republic
- Suwa, Japan

== Y ==
Ybbs an der Donau

- Bobbio, Italy

Yspertal

- Veselí nad Lužnicí, Czech Republic

== Z ==
Zell

- Škofja Loka, Slovenia

Zell am Pettenfirst

- Perlesreut, Germany

Zell am See

- Vellmar, Germany

Zeltweg

- Enns, Austria
- Gyöngyös, Hungary

Zistersdorf

- Hodonín, Czech Republic
- Nienhagen, Germany
- Zwettl, Austria

Zwettl

- Jindřichův Hradec, Czech Republic
- Plochingen, Germany
- Zistersdorf, Austria
