= Haibach =

Haibach may refer to the following places:

- in Bavaria, Germany:
  - Haibach, Lower Franconia, in the district of Aschaffenburg
  - Haibach, Lower Bavaria, in the district Straubing-Bogen
- in Upper Austria, Austria:
  - Haibach ob der Donau, in the district of Eferding
  - Haibach im Mühlkreis, in the district Urfahr-Umgebung
