= Betsafe Cup =

Football tournament

The Betsafe Cup was a summer football friendly tournament played twice in 2014 and 2015. In 2014 only two teams participated in the competition, which was hosted by German club FC Ingolstadt 04, who played against 1. FC Köln (Germany). The second edition in 2015 took place in Austria with four teams: 1. FC Köln, Kasımpaşa S.K., SC Cambuur and Espanyol Barcelona.

== 2014 ==
=== Match ===
26 July 2014
16:00 CEST

FC Ingolstadt 04 (Germany)	2–0	(Germany) 1. FC Köln
Groß 32'; Hinterseer 55'

Audi Sportpark, Ingolstadt

== 2015 ==
=== Matches ===
21 July 2015	Kasımpaşa S.K.	2-1	SC Cambuur	Gallneukirchen
16:30 CEST (UTC+02:00)		Report

22 July 2015	Espanyol Barcelona	2-0	1. FC Köln	Kufstein
20:00 CEST (UTC+02:00)		Report

24 July 2015	1. FC Köln	2-0	SC Cambuur	Kitzbühel
20:00 CEST (UTC+02:00)		Report

24 July 2015	Espanyol Barcelona	2-1	Kasımpaşa S.K.	Mondsee
19:00 CEST (UTC+02:00)		Report

== Standings ==
Rank	Team	GP	W	D	L	GF	GA	GD	Pts
1	(Spain) Espanyol Barcelona	2	2	0	0	4	1	3	6
2	(Turkey) Kasımpaşa S.K.	2	1	0	1	3	3	0	3
3	(Germany) 1. FC Köln	2	1	0	1	2	2	0	3
4	(Netherlands) SC Cambuur	2	0	0	2	1	4	–3	0
