= Roland Rainer =

Austrian architect (1910–2004)

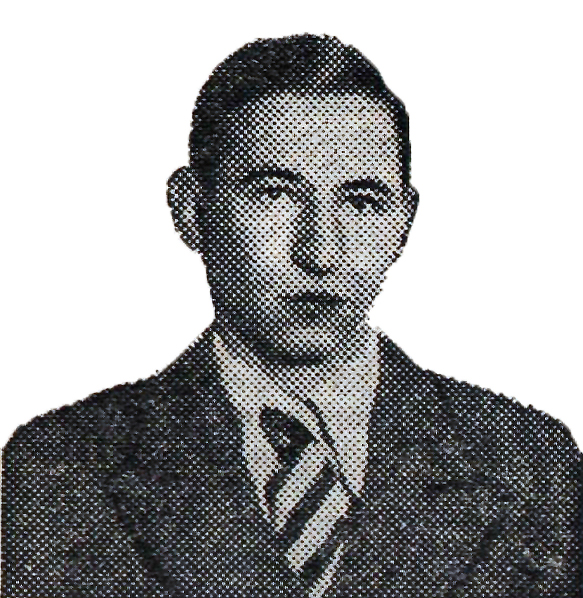
Roland Rainer ca. 1935

Roland Rainer (1 May 1910 – 10 April 2004) was an Austrian architect.

Born in Klagenfurt, Roland Rainer decided to become an architect when he was 18, so he studied at the Technische Hochschule in Vienna (now TU Wien). His thesis was about the Karlsplatz in Vienna. Then, he left Austria to visit the Netherlands and the German Academy for Urban Design in Berlin. He became a member of the ruling Nazi Party and endorsed their policies in his theoretical works. After World War II, he returned to Austria and continued writing, including his most famous work Urban design prose.

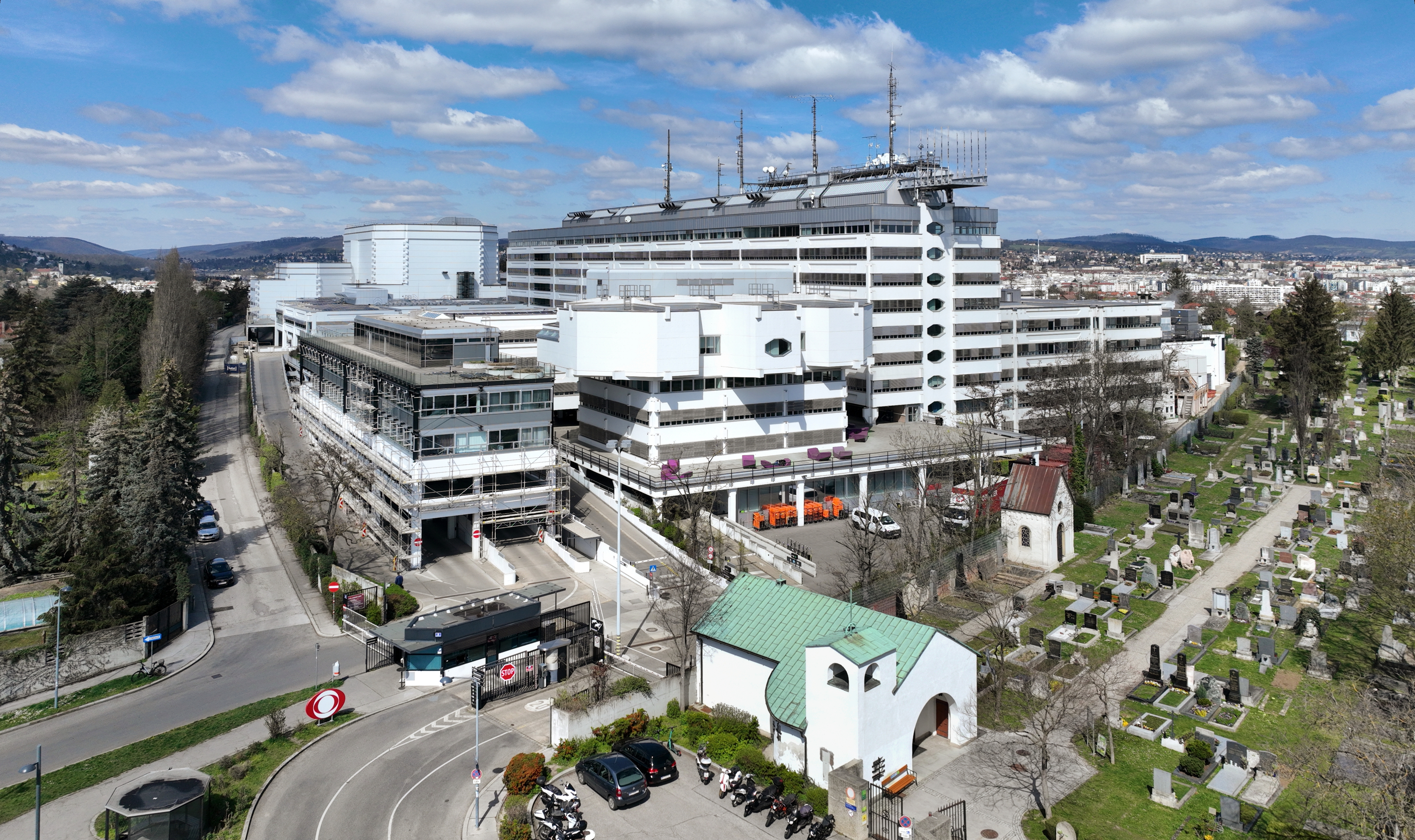
ORF-Zentrum am Küniglberg in Vienna (1968-1975)

He was then called to several institutions: the Technische Hochschulen in Charlottenburg (now Technische Universität Berlin), in Braunschweig (now Technische Universität Braunschweig) and Munich (now Technical University of Munich) as well as the Technion - Israel Institute of Technology. In 1953, Rainer became professor for housing, urban design, and land use planning at the Technische Hochschule Hannover (now Leibniz University Hannover). In 1954, he became professor for structural engineering at the Technische Hochschule Graz (now Graz University of Technology), which forced him to commute between Graz and Hannover. From 1954, Rainer led the Master School for Architecture at the Academy of Fine Arts Vienna.

From 1956 to 1962, one of his most significant works, the Wiener Stadthalle in Vienna, was built. On July 1, 1958, Rainer was commissioned with the development of the zoning plan by the town council of Vienna. From 1987, Rainer was chairman of the curia for art of the Austrian Decoration for Science and Art. He was also a constant critic of environmental destruction and bad constructions. In 1967 he took part in the international competition of urbanist concept for Bratislava-Petrzalka district in Slovakia.

In 2006, the Roland-Rainer-Platz, in front of the Wiener Stadthalle, was named after him.

== Honours and awards ==
- 1954: City of Vienna Prize for Architecture
- 1962: Austrian Cross of Honour for Science and Art
- 1962: Grand Austrian State Prize for Architecture
- 1969: Austrian Bauherrenpreis for "garden village" development at Puchenau, in Linz
- 1973: Honorary Member ("Honorary Fellow") of the American Institute of Architects
- 1979: Austrian Decoration for Science and Art
- 1985: Honorary Ring of the City of Vienna
- 2000: Grand Decoration of Honour in Gold with Star for Services to the Republic of Austria
- 2006: Austrian Bauherrenpreis for the Roland-Rainer-Siedlung garden city development in St. Pölten (posthumously)
