= Altlichtenberg =

Coordinates: 48°21′00″N 014°16′00″E

Altlichtenberg is a populated place in Upper Austria, Austria. It is part (Ortsteil) of Lichtenberg. As of 1 January 2019, population was 1,174.
