= Gusen (river) =

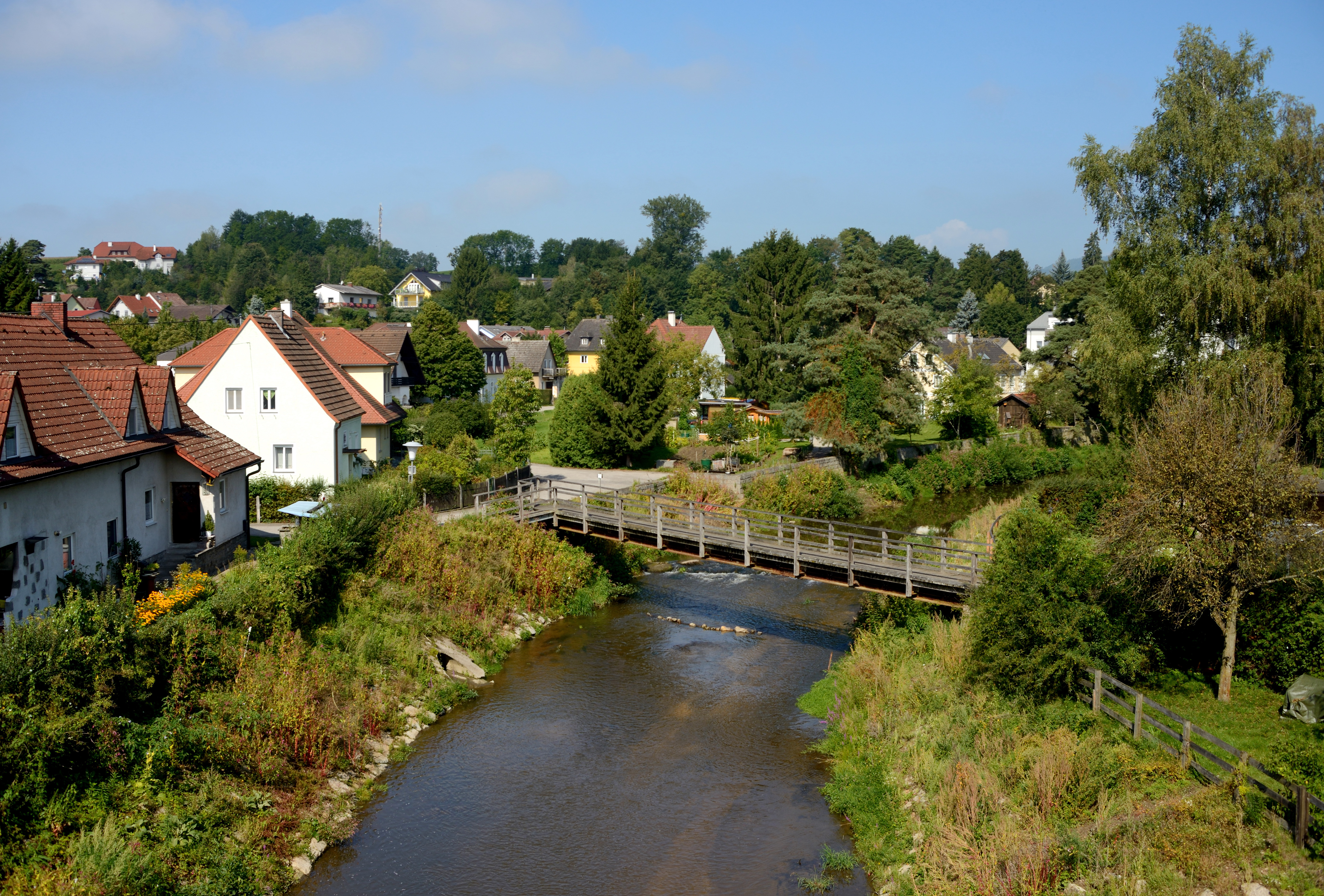
- The Gusen in Sankt Georgen

Location
- Country: Austria
- State: Upper Austria

Physical characteristics
- Mouth
  - location: Danube
  - coordinates: 48.2456°N 14.4989°E
- Length: 39.9 km (24.8 mi)

Basin features
- Progression: Danube→ Black Sea

The Gusen is a small river in Upper Austria.

Including its source river Große Gusen, the Gusen is 39.9 km (24.8 mi) long. The Große Gusen flows through Reichenau im Mühlkreis and Gallneukirchen. It is joined by the Kleine Gusen at Breitenbruck, Katsdorf. The Gusen continues through Sankt Georgen an der Gusen. At Langenstein, near Mauthausen, the Gusen flows into the Danube.
