= Siedlung =

Siedlung, a German word meaning settlement, may refer to several places:

== Austria ==
- Überlendner-Siedlung, a village in Upper Austria

== Germany ==
- Siedlung (Dessau), a quarter of Dessau, Saxony-Anhalt
- Siedlung Neu-Jerusalem, a zone of Berlin

== See also ==
- Stadtrandsiedlung (disambiguation)
