= Tiergarten Walding =

Tiergarten & Reiterhof Walding
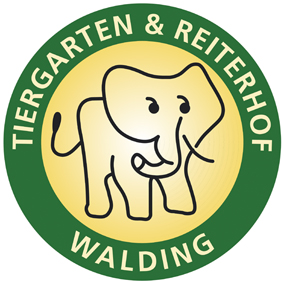
- Interactive map of Tiergarten & Reiterhof Walding
- 48°21′2.17″N 14°08′10.96″E
- Date opened: 1979
- Location: Mursberg, Walding, Austria
- Owner: Angela Mair
- Website: http://www.tiergartenwalding.com

Tiergarten Walding (literally, “Walding Zoo”), is a small zoo located on a hill in the village of Walding, in the district of Urfahr-Umgebung in the Austrian state of Upper Austria.

Founded in 1967 as a smaller Animal shelter at a farm and Gasthaus in Pasching southwest of Linz, the owners moved the animals to a new location in Walding in 1973, and were granted a zoo licence in 1979. The zoo keeps gibbons, leopards, lions, ocelots, zebras, servals, and tigers, amongst other species.
