= Zwettl (disambiguation) =

Zwettl is a town in Lower Austria, Austria.

Zwettl may also refer to:

- SC Zwettl, an Austrian football club playing in Zwettl
- Zwettl Abbey, a Cistercian monastery in Zwettl, in the Diocese of St. Pölten
- Zwettl (district), a district of the state of Lower Austria

== See also ==
- Zwettl an der Rodl, a municipality in the district of Urfahr-Umgebung, Upper Austria
