= Oberneukirchen, Austria =

Oberneukirchen
- Municipality
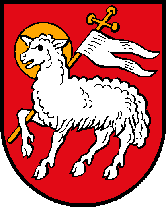
- Coat of arms

- Location within Austria
- Coordinates: 48°27′53″N 14°13′38″E
- Country: Austria
- State: Upper Austria
- District: Urfahr-Umgebung

Government
  - Mayor: Josef Rathgeb (ÖVP)

Area
  - Total: 34.55 km^{2} (13.34 sq mi)
- Elevation: 774 m (2,539 ft)

Population (2018-01-01)
  - Total: 3,202
  - Density: 92.68/km^{2} (240.0/sq mi)
- Time zone: UTC+1 (CET)
  - Summer (DST): UTC+2 (CEST)
- Postal code: 4181
- Area code: 0 72 12
- Vehicle registration: UU
- Website: www.oberneukirchen. ooe.gv.at

Oberneukirchen is a municipality in the district of Urfahr-Umgebung in the Austrian state of Upper Austria.

== Population ==
Historical population
Year	Pop.	±%
1991	2,946	—
2001	3,009	+2.1%
