= Feldkirchen an der Donau =

- Municipality
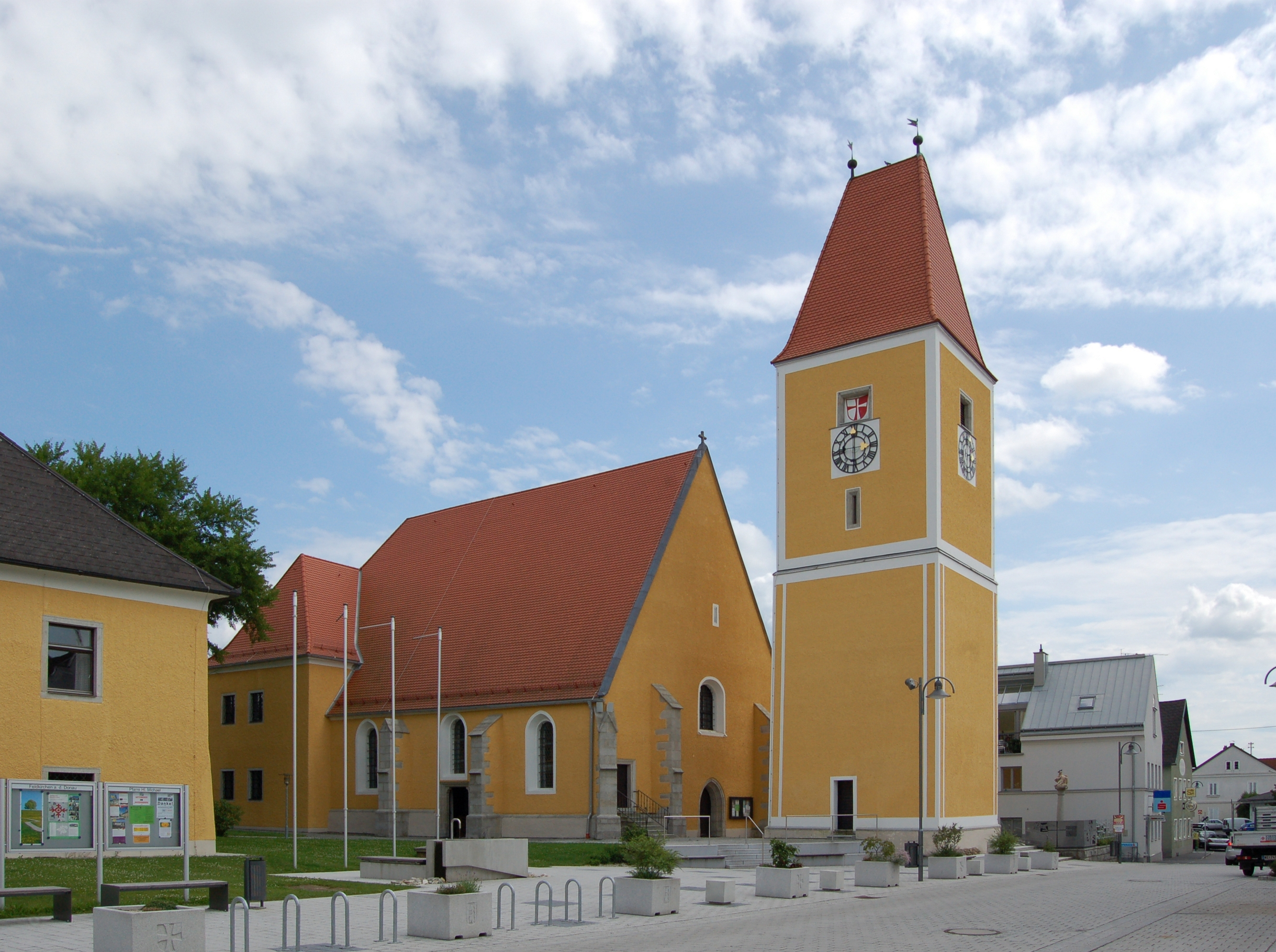

- Coat of arms

- Location within Austria
- Coordinates: 48°20′44″N 14°03′01″E
- Country: Austria
- State: Upper Austria
- District: Urfahr-Umgebung

Government
  - Mayor: David Allerstorfer (SPÖ)

Area
  - Total: 39.35 km^{2} (15.19 sq mi)
- Elevation: 268 m (879 ft)

Population (2018-01-01)
  - Total: 5,361
  - Density: 136.2/km^{2} (352.9/sq mi)
- Time zone: UTC+1 (CET)
  - Summer (DST): UTC+2 (CEST)
- Postal code: 4101
- Area code: 07233
- Vehicle registration: UU
- Website: www.feldkirchen-donau.at

Feldkirchen an der Donau is a municipality in the district of Urfahr-Umgebung in the Austrian state of Upper Austria. A group of five lakes called the Feldkirchner Badeseen (Feldkirchen Bathing Lakes) is located in the municipality.

Feldkirchen was the birthplace of the conductor and composer Hans Schläger (1820–1885).

== Population ==
Historical population
Year	Pop.	±%
1991	4,634	—
2001	5,066	+9.3%
