= Feldkirchner Badeseen =

Lakes in Upper Austria

Coordinates: 48.326°N 14.069°E

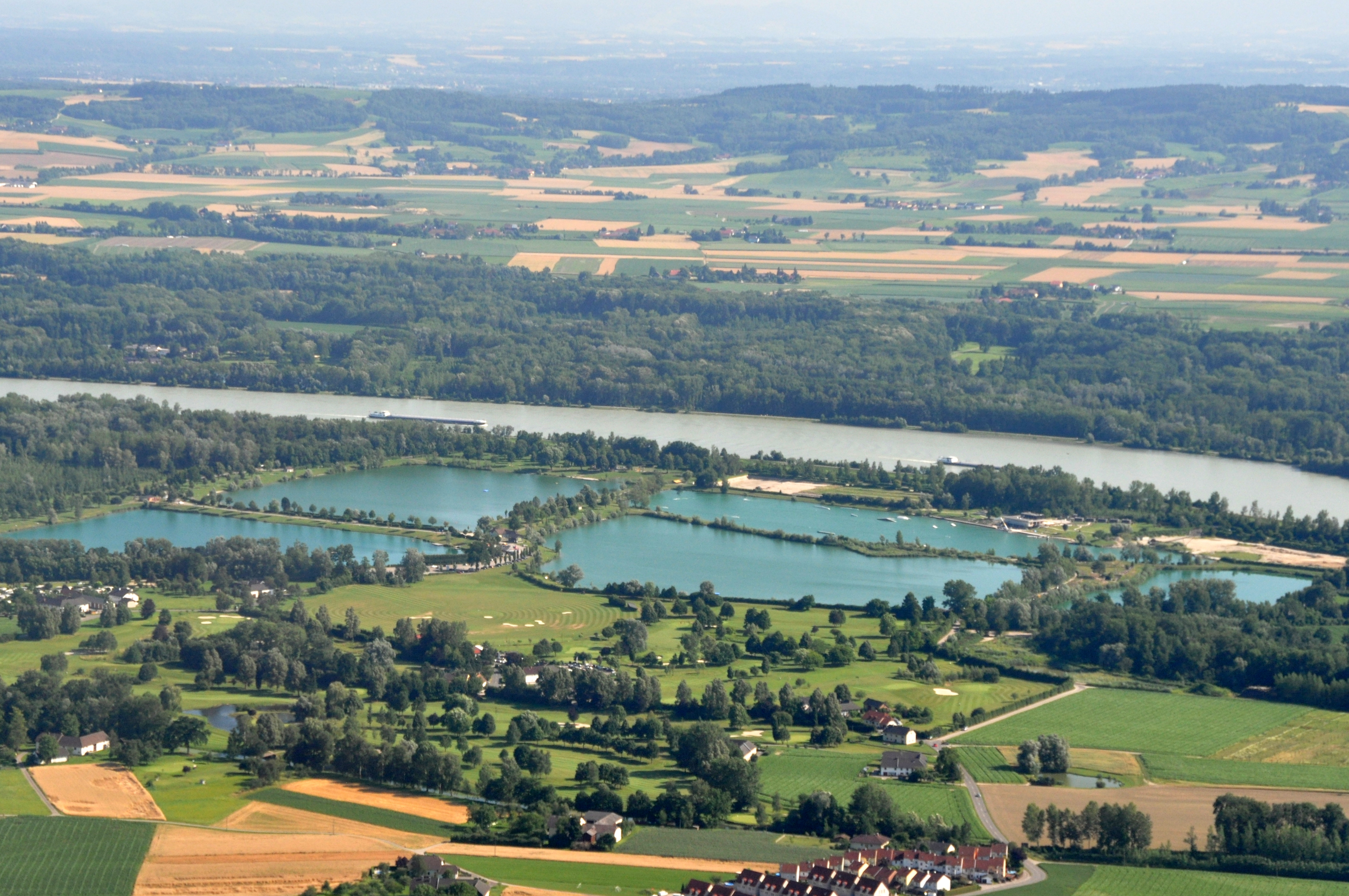
The Feldkirchner Badeseen in 2015

The Feldkirchner Badeseen are a group of five lakes in the municipality of Feldkirchen an der Donau, Upper Austria.
