= Stadtrandsiedlung =

Stadtrandsiedlung is a German word meaning "suburban settlement". It may refer to several places in Germany:

- Stadtrandsiedlung, a quarter in downtown Greifswald
- Stadtrandsiedlung (Am Stadtrand), a neighbourhood in Potsdam
- Stadtrandsiedlung Blankenfelde, a neighbourhood in Blankenfelde, in the Berliner borough of Pankow
- Stadtrandsiedlung Buch, a neighbourhood in Karow, in the Berliner borough of Pankow
- Stadtrandsiedlung Malchow, a locality in the Berliner borough of Pankow

== See also ==
- Siedlung (disambiguation)
