= Ulrichsberg =

- Municipality
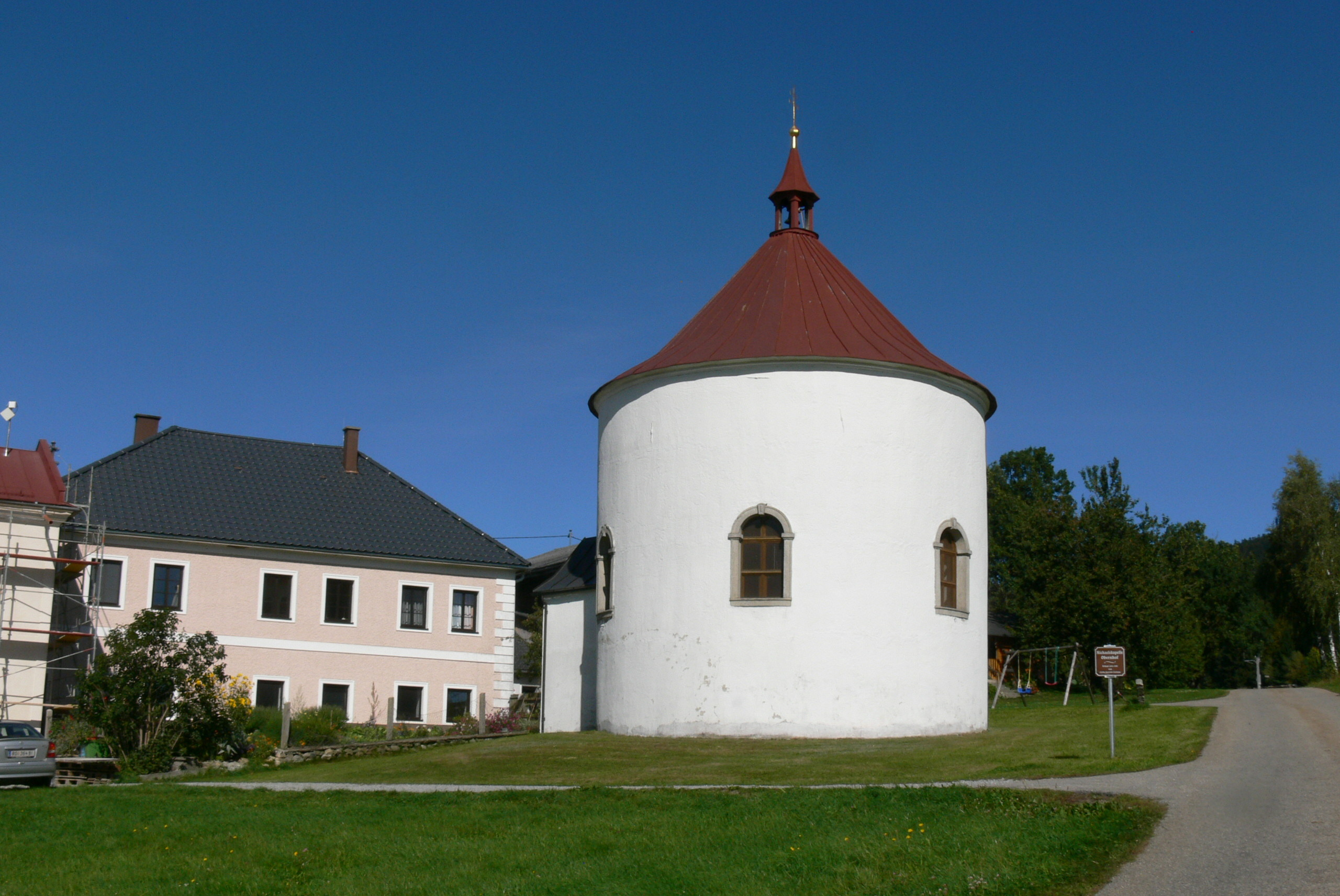

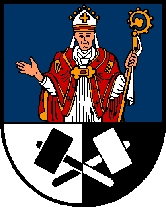
- Coat of arms

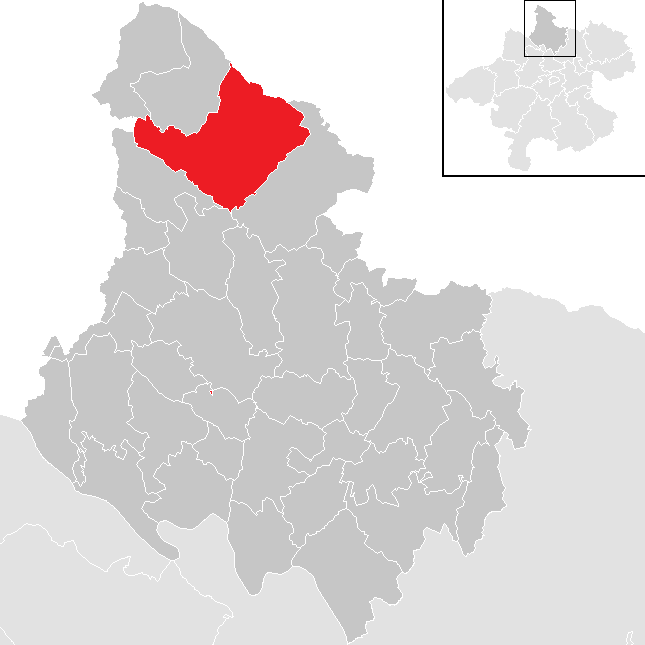
- Location in the district

- Location within Austria
- Coordinates: 48°40′32″N 13°54′44″E
- Country: Austria
- State: Upper Austria
- District: Rohrbach

Government
  - Mayor: Wilfried Kellermann (ÖVP)

Area
  - Total: 56.91 km^{2} (21.97 sq mi)
- Elevation: 626 m (2,054 ft)

Population (2018-01-01)
  - Total: 2,843
  - Density: 49.96/km^{2} (129.4/sq mi)
- Time zone: UTC+1 (CET)
  - Summer (DST): UTC+2 (CEST)
- Postal code: 4161
- Area code: 07288
- Vehicle registration: RO
- Website: www.ulrichsberg.at

Ulrichsberg (Ulrich´s Mountain) is a municipality in the district of Rohrbach in the Austrian state of Upper Austria.

== Geography ==
Ulrichsberg lies in Mühlviertel in Upper Austria near the Bohemian Forest and along the Große Mühl river (north of the Danube). It covers an area of 12.2 km north to south and 10.3 km east to west for a total area of 57 km^{2}. 51.8% of the area is forested and 44.7% of the area is in agricultural use.

Nearby Gemeinden (municipalities) are: Berdetschlag, Breitenstein, Dietrichschlag, Erlet, Fuchslug, Hintenberg, Kandlschlag, Lichtenberg, Mühlwald, Ödenkirchen, Salnau, Schindlau, Seitelschlag, Sonnenwald, Stangl, Stollnberg, Ulrichsberg, and Zaglau. North of Lichtenberg, in Schöneben, is a small border crossing to the Czech Republic.

== History ==
Ulrichsberg was first mentioned in a document in 1325.
