= Engerwitzdorf =

- Municipality
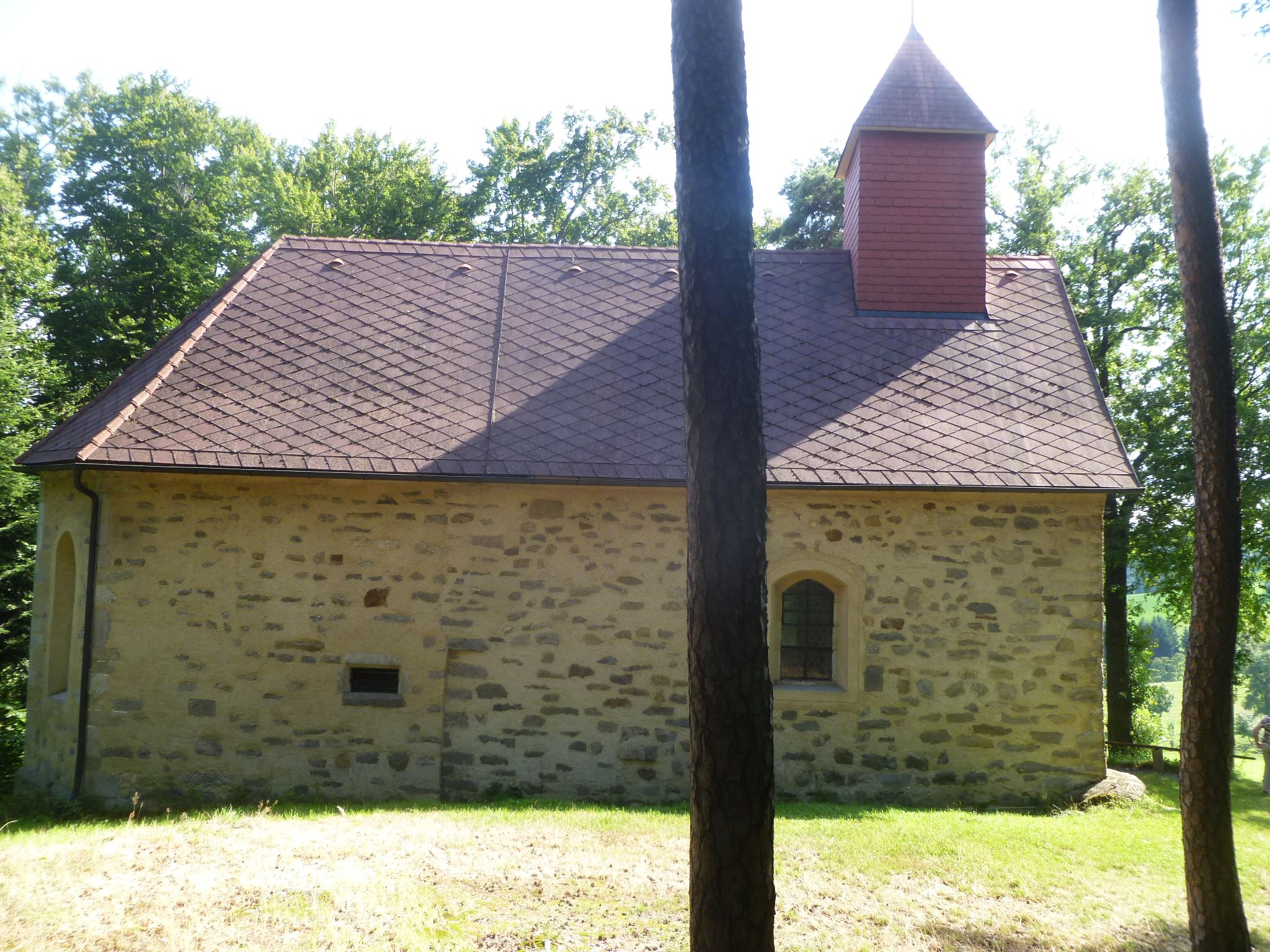

- Coat of arms

- Location within Austria
- Coordinates: 48°20′23″N 14°25′32″E
- Country: Austria
- State: Upper Austria
- District: Urfahr-Umgebung

Government
  - Mayor: Herbert Fürst (ÖVP)

Area
  - Total: 41.09 km^{2} (15.86 sq mi)
- Elevation: 333 m (1,093 ft)

Population (2018-01-01)
  - Total: 8,790
  - Density: 214/km^{2} (554/sq mi)
- Time zone: UTC+1 (CET)
  - Summer (DST): UTC+2 (CEST)
- Postal code: 4209
- Area code: 0 72 35
- Vehicle registration: UU
- Website: www.engerwitzdorf.at

Engerwitzdorf is a municipality in the district of Urfahr-Umgebung in the Austrian state of Upper Austria. It is one of the largest municipalities in Upper Austria although it only has about 8000 inhabitants.

== Geography ==
Engerwitzdorf is located near Upper Austria's capital city Linz and even nearer to the little but very popular city of Gallneukirchen.

== Population ==
Historical population
Year	Pop.	±%
1869	2,431	—
1880	2,435	+0.2%
1890	2,439	+0.2%
1900	2,430	−0.4%
1910	2,612	+7.5%
1923	2,528	−3.2%
1934	2,557	+1.1%
1939	2,405	−5.9%
1951	2,581	+7.3%
1961	2,924	+13.3%
1971	4,128	+41.2%
1981	5,246	+27.1%
1991	6,014	+14.6%
2001	7,516	+25.0%
2011	8,528	+13.5%
