= Ottenschlag im Mühlkreis =

- Municipality
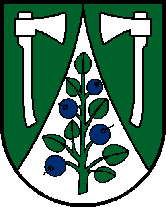
- Coat of arms

- Location within Austria
- Coordinates: 48°28′00″N 14°23′01″E
- Country: Austria
- State: Upper Austria
- District: Urfahr-Umgebung

Government
  - Mayor: Franz Beirl (ÖVP)

Area
  - Total: 13.18 km^{2} (5.09 sq mi)
- Elevation: 806 m (2,644 ft)

Population (2018-01-01)
  - Total: 539
  - Density: 40.9/km^{2} (106/sq mi)
- Time zone: UTC+1 (CET)
  - Summer (DST): UTC+2 (CEST)
- Postal code: 4204
- Area code: 07211
- Vehicle registration: UU
- Website: www.ottenschlag.at

Ottenschlag im Mühlkreis is a municipality in the district of Urfahr-Umgebung in the Austrian state of Upper Austria.

== Population ==
Historical population
Year	Pop.	±%
1991	477	—
2001	479	+0.4%
