= Sonnberg im Mühlkreis =

- Municipality
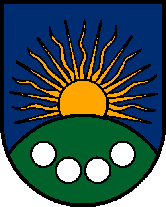
- Coat of arms

- Location within Austria
- Coordinates: 48°27′34″N 14°17′27″E
- Country: Austria
- State: Upper Austria
- District: Urfahr-Umgebung

Government
  - Mayor: Leopold Eder (ÖVP)

Area
  - Total: 12.55 km^{2} (4.85 sq mi)
- Elevation: 740 m (2,430 ft)

Population (2018-01-01)
  - Total: 966
  - Density: 77.0/km^{2} (199/sq mi)
- Time zone: UTC+1 (CET)
  - Summer (DST): UTC+2 (CEST)
- Postal code: 4180
- Area code: 07212
- Vehicle registration: UU
- Website: www.sonnberg.ooe.gv.at

Sonnberg im Mühlkreis is a municipality in the district of Urfahr-Umgebung in the Austrian state of Upper Austria.

== Population ==
Historical population
Year	Pop.	±%
1991	716	—
2001	794	+10.9%
