= Eidenberg =

- Municipality
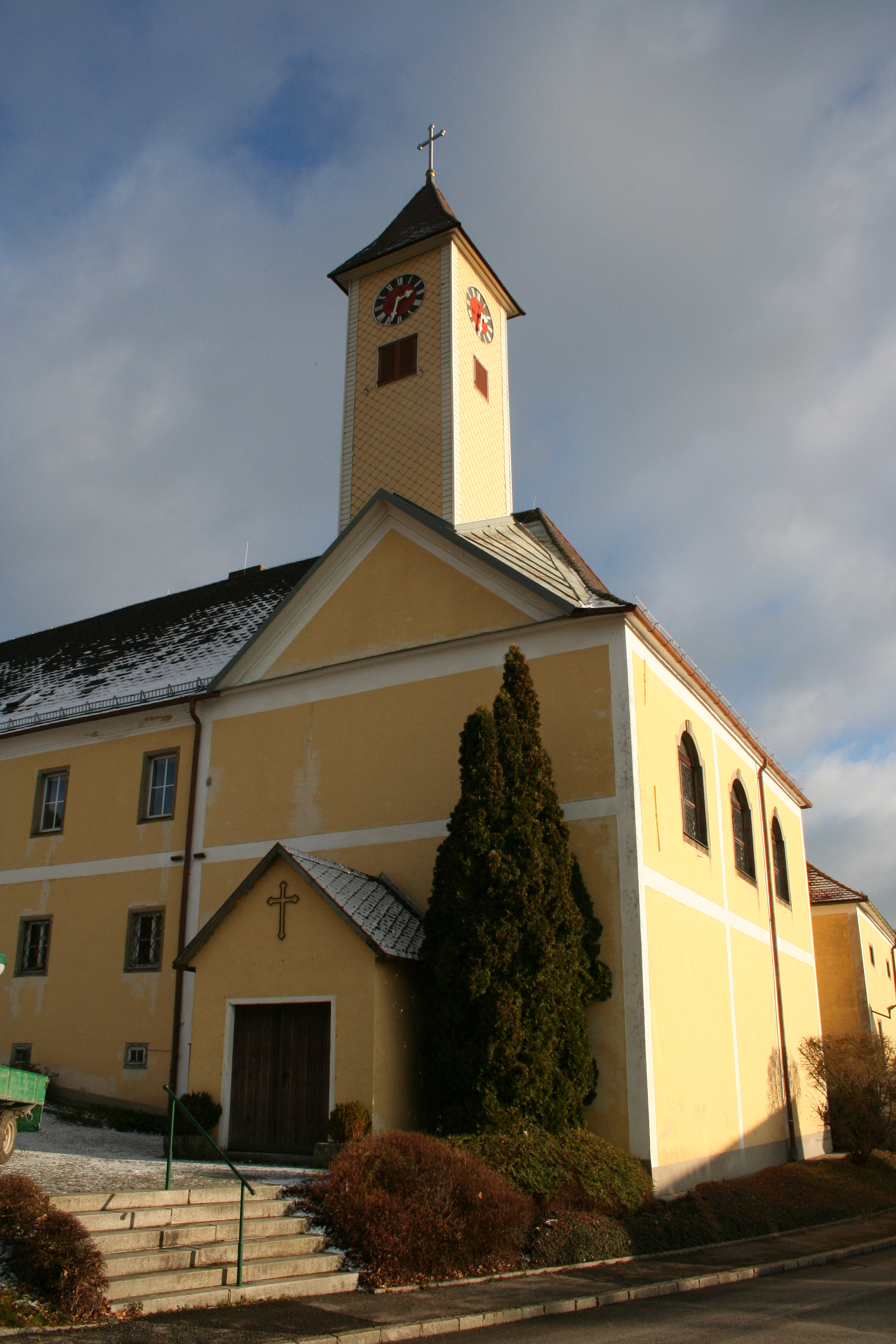
- New castle

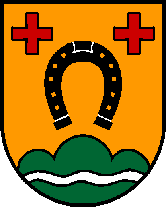
- Coat of arms

- Location within Austria
- Coordinates: 48°23′42″N 14°13′51″E
- Country: Austria
- State: Upper Austria
- District: Urfahr-Umgebung

Government
  - Mayor: Adolf Hinterhölzl (ÖVP)

Area
  - Total: 29.28 km^{2} (11.31 sq mi)
- Elevation: 685 m (2,247 ft)

Population (2018-01-01)
  - Total: 2,105
  - Density: 71.89/km^{2} (186.2/sq mi)
- Time zone: UTC+1 (CET)
  - Summer (DST): UTC+2 (CEST)
- Postal code: 4201
- Area code: 07239
- Vehicle registration: UU
- Website: www.eidenberg.at

Eidenberg is a municipality in the district of Urfahr-Umgebung in the Austrian state of Upper Austria, with 2105 inhabitants (as of 1 January 2018). The community is located in the judicial district Urfahr.

== Population ==
Historical population
Year	Pop.	±%
1991	1,646	—
2001	1,812	+10.1%
2008	1,988	+9.7%
