= Walding =

- Municipality
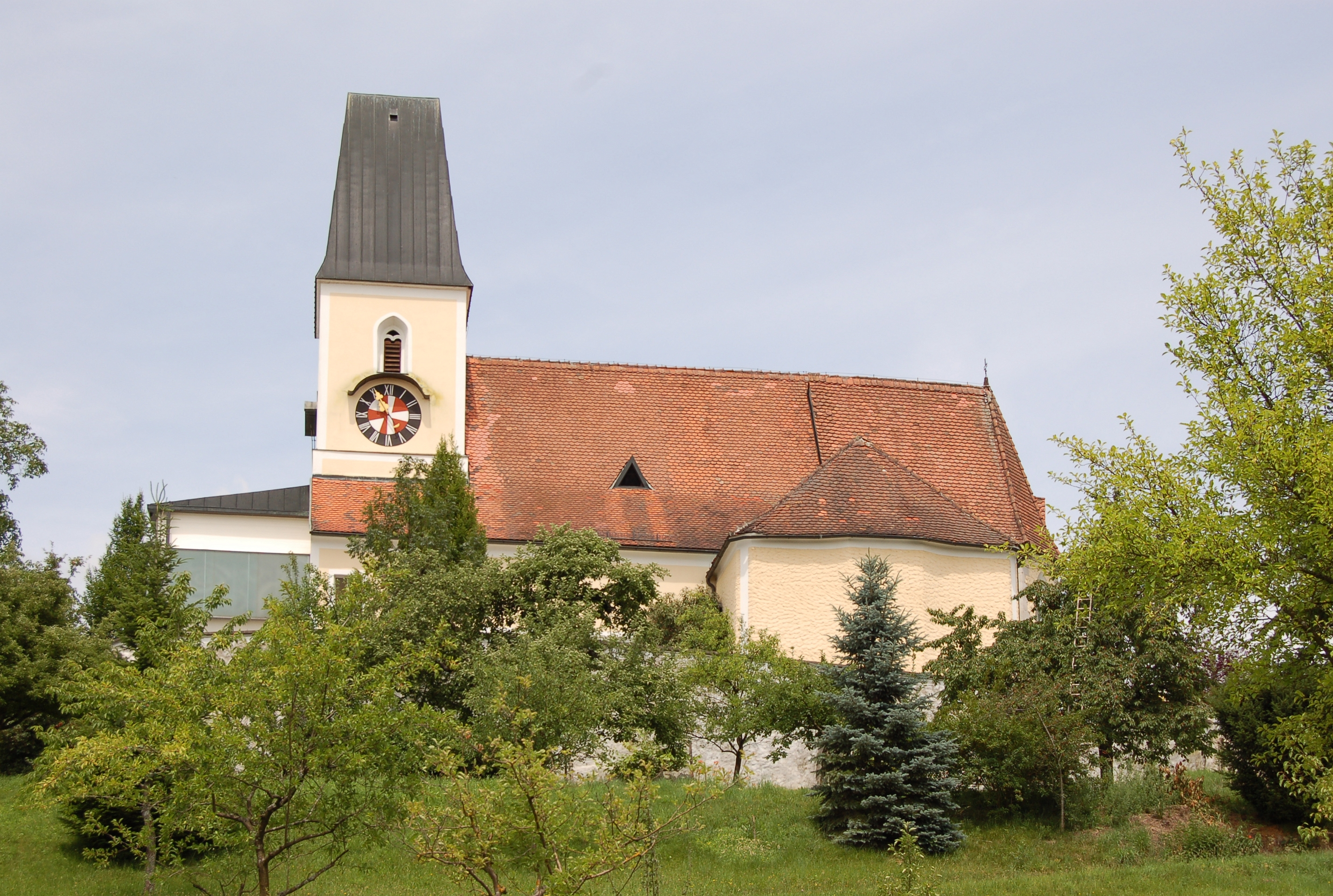

- Coat of arms

- Location within Austria
- Coordinates: 48°21′01″N 14°09′44″E
- Country: Austria
- State: Upper Austria
- District: Urfahr-Umgebung

Government
  - Mayor: Johann Plakolm (ÖVP)

Area
  - Total: 15.32 km^{2} (5.92 sq mi)
- Elevation: 303 m (994 ft)

Population (2018-01-01)
  - Total: 4,095
  - Density: 267.3/km^{2} (692.3/sq mi)
- Time zone: UTC+1 (CET)
  - Summer (DST): UTC+2 (CEST)
- Postal code: 4111
- Area code: 07234
- Vehicle registration: UU
- Website: www.walding.at

Walding is a municipality in the district of Urfahr-Umgebung in the Austrian state of Upper Austria.

== History ==
Prehistoric settlement traces can be found at the Burgstall Schwarzgrub.

In the Middle Ages, Walding was located in the eastern part of the Duchy of Bavaria. In the present-day municipality of Walding was from late 8. Century a now descended place Raotula (Rotala), like certificates from the 10. Century showing that dates back to the years 777, 789 or Around 906, the inhabitants of the Rodltal are mentioned in the Raffelstetten Customs Regulations. The Waltenstein Castle Stall also dates back to about this time. Since the 12. The municipality of Walding belonged to the Duchy of Austria for a century. The village of Lindham was named around 1150, and Purwörth in 1273. The place Walding itself is only mentioned in a document for the first time in 1317, whereby the place name should go back to the Old High German person name Walto. Since 1490, Walding has been attributed to the Principality of Austria ob der Enns.

In the 18. For a century, Walding as a place of pilgrimage (“Maria Walding”) had supra-regional significance, but lost this status on the intervention of the gentlemen of the Pöstlingberg, who shunned the competition. During the Napoleonic Wars, the area was occupied several times; since then, it has been part of Upper Austria again.

From 1766, the mining of alum and lignite on the Mursberg is attested. Coal extraction at the villages of Schwarzgrub and Mursberg was repeatedly interrupted and was last recorded at short notice in 1946

After the annexation of Austria to the German Reich on 13. In March 1938, Upper Austria became the Gau Oberdonau. After 1945, the restoration of Upper Austria took place.

== Population ==
Historical population
| Year | Pop. | ±% |
|---|---|---|
| 1991 | 3,245 | — |
| 2001 | 3,768 | +16.1% |

== See also ==
- Überlendner-Siedlung
- Walding Zoo
