= Herzogsdorf =

- Municipality
- Coat of arms

- Location within Austria
- Coordinates: 48°25′52″N 14°06′49″E
- Country: Austria
- State: Upper Austria
- District: Urfahr-Umgebung

Government
  - Mayor: Alois Erlinger (ÖVP)

Area
  - Total: 35.39 km^{2} (13.66 sq mi)
- Elevation: 591 m (1,939 ft)

Population (2018-01-01)
  - Total: 2,506
  - Density: 70.81/km^{2} (183.4/sq mi)
- Time zone: UTC+1 (CET)
  - Summer (DST): UTC+2 (CEST)
- Postal code: 4175
- Area code: 07231
- Vehicle registration: UU
- Website: www.herzogsdorf.at

Herzogsdorf is a municipality in the district of Urfahr-Umgebung in the Austrian state of Upper Austria.

== Population ==
Historical population
Year	Pop.	±%
1991	2,131	—
2001	2,362	+10.8%
