= Reichenthal =

- Municipality
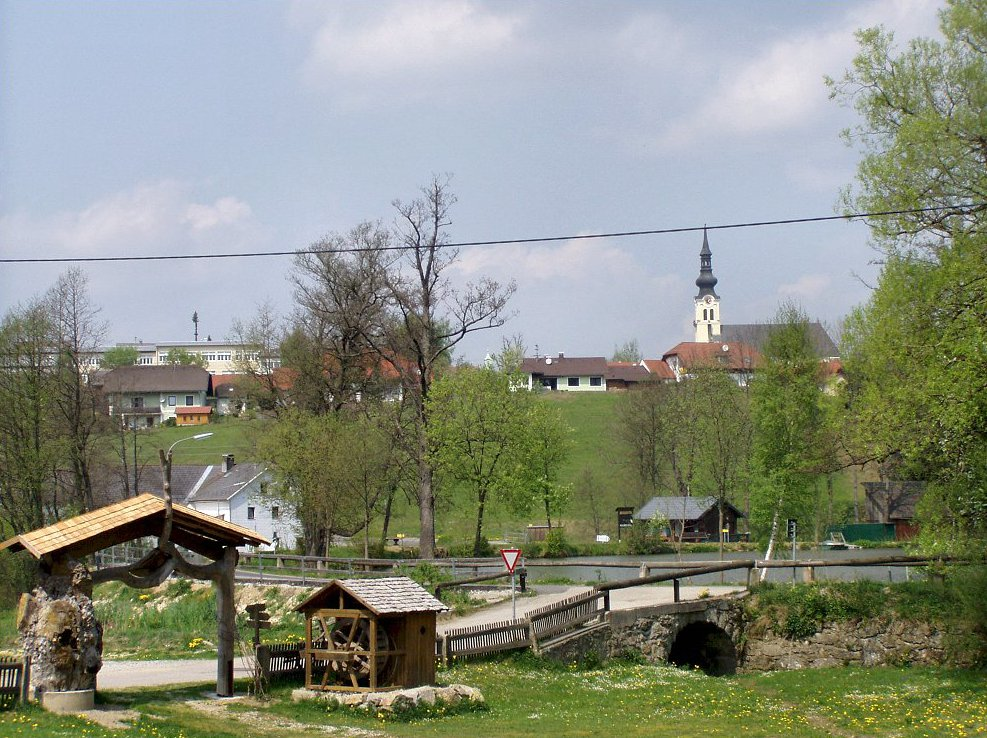

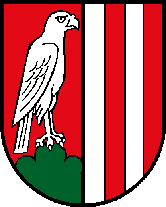
- Coat of arms

- Location within Austria
- Coordinates: 48°32′47″N 14°23′01″E
- Country: Austria
- State: Upper Austria
- District: Urfahr-Umgebung

Government
  - Mayor: Karl Jaksch (ÖVP)

Area
  - Total: 18.85 km^{2} (7.28 sq mi)
- Elevation: 683 m (2,241 ft)

Population (2018-01-01)
  - Total: 1,513
  - Density: 80.27/km^{2} (207.9/sq mi)
- Time zone: UTC+1 (CET)
  - Summer (DST): UTC+2 (CEST)
- Postal code: 4193
- Area code: 0 72 14
- Vehicle registration: UU
- Website: www.reichenthal.at

Reichenthal is a municipality in the district of Urfahr-Umgebung in the Austrian state of Upper Austria.

== Population ==
Historical population
Year	Pop.	±%
1991	1,264	—
2001	1,386	+9.7%
