= Goldwörth =

- Municipality
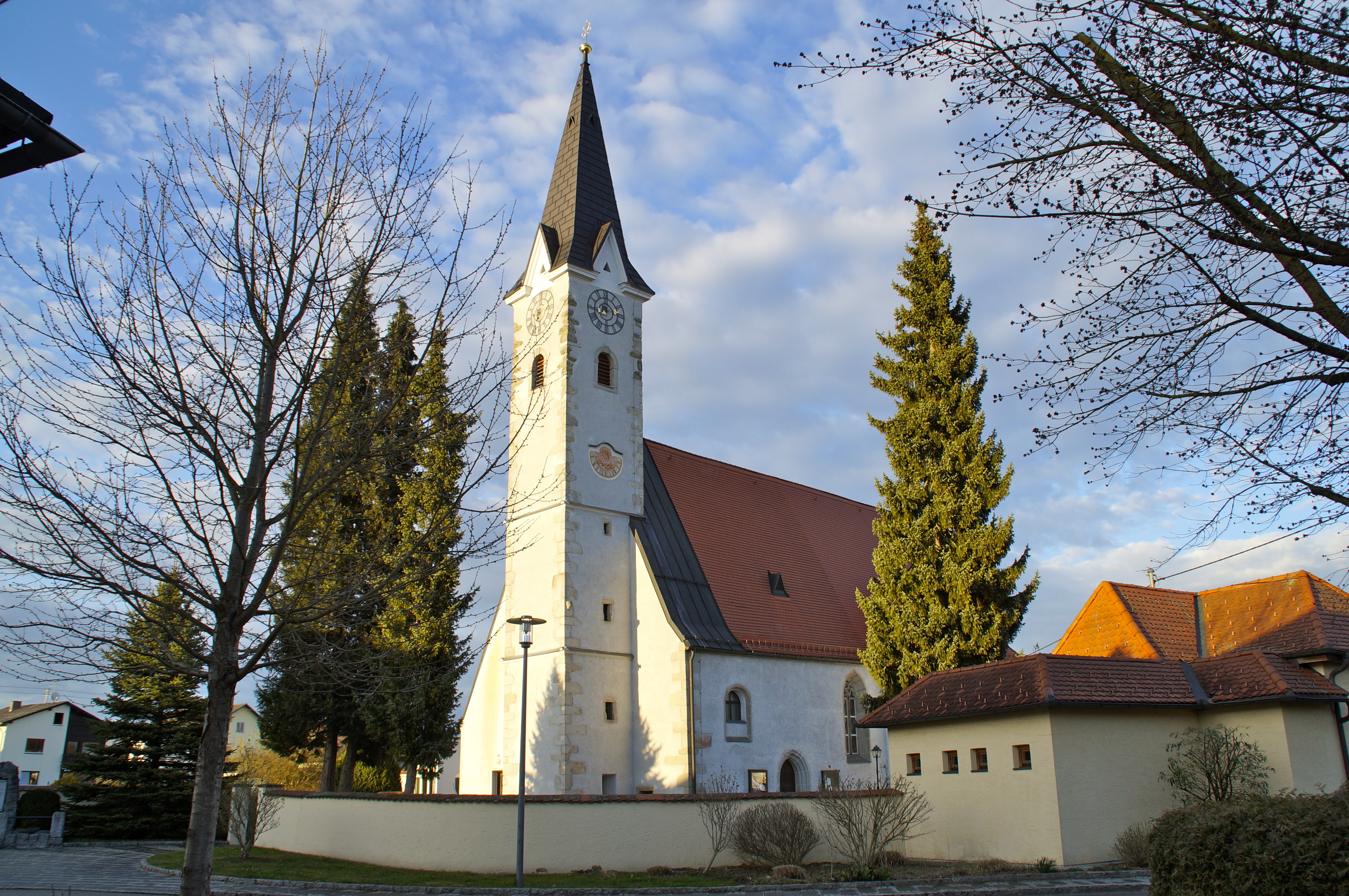

- Coat of arms

- Location within Austria
- Coordinates: 48°20′39″N 14°06′00″E
- Country: Austria
- State: Upper Austria
- District: Urfahr-Umgebung

Government
  - Mayor: Johann Müllner (ÖVP)

Area
  - Total: 10.83 km^{2} (4.18 sq mi)
- Elevation: 262 m (860 ft)

Population (2018-01-01)
  - Total: 840
  - Density: 78/km^{2} (200/sq mi)
- Time zone: UTC+1 (CET)
  - Summer (DST): UTC+2 (CEST)
- Postal code: 4102
- Area code: 0 72 34
- Vehicle registration: UU
- Website: www.goldwoerth.at

Goldwörth is a municipality in the district of Urfahr-Umgebung in the Austrian state of Upper Austria. The municipality is primarily rural, with much of its area covered by farmland, forests, and small settlements.

== Geography ==
Goldwörth lies in the upper Mühlviertel. It's located near the confluence of the Danube River and its tributaries.
