= Steyregg =

- Municipality
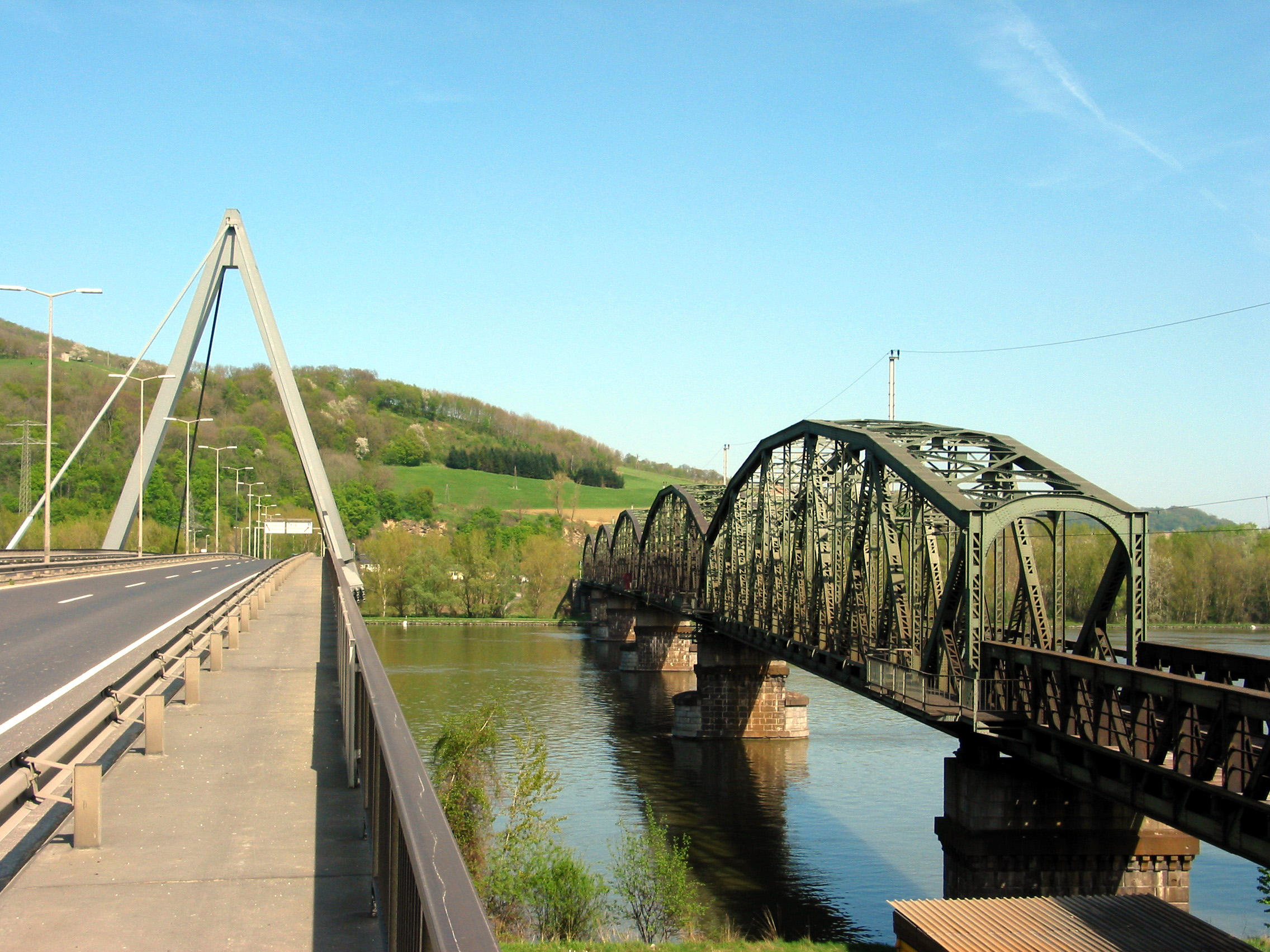

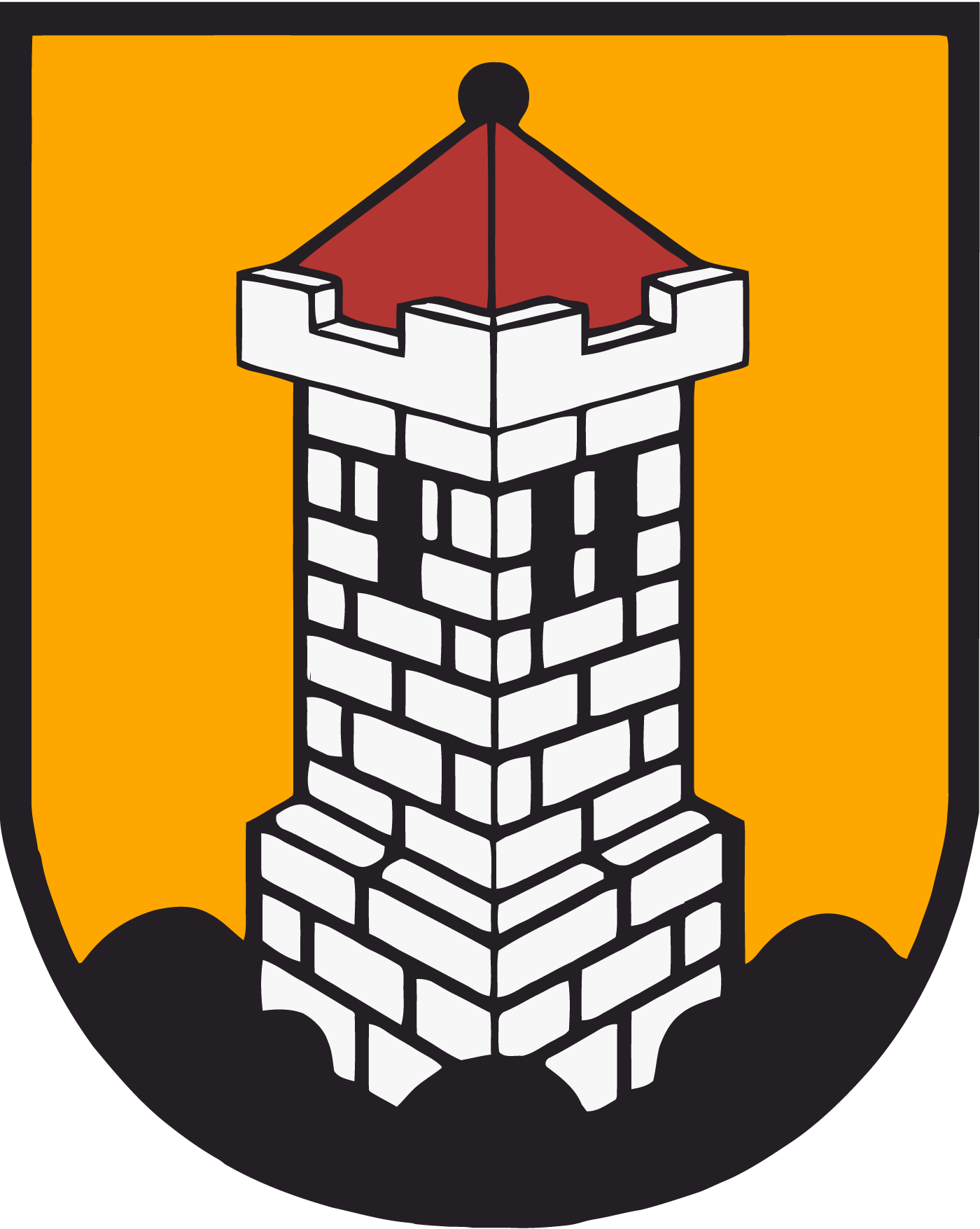
- Coat of arms

- Location within Austria
- Coordinates: 48°17′01″N 14°22′00″E
- Country: Austria
- State: Upper Austria
- District: Urfahr-Umgebung

Government
  - Mayor: Gerhard Hintringer (SPÖ)

Area
  - Total: 33.07 km^{2} (12.77 sq mi)
- Elevation: 259 m (850 ft)

Population (2018-01-01)
  - Total: 4,889
  - Density: 147.8/km^{2} (382.9/sq mi)
- Time zone: UTC+1 (CET)
  - Summer (DST): UTC+2 (CEST)
- Postal code: 4221
- Area code: 0732
- Vehicle registration: UU
- Website: www.steyregg.at

Steyregg is a municipality in the district of Urfahr-Umgebung in the Austrian state of Upper Austria.

== History ==
The first settlements in the Steyregg area were established during the Neolithic period, as evidenced by archaeological excavations. A settlement in Windegg, dating back to around 6000 BC, was an important cultural and trade center along the Danube. Another significant site from around 3500 BC is located near the Pulgarn monastery.

Tafersheim

During the early Middle Ages, several villages emerged in strategically advantageous locations along the Danube, serving as key transshipment points for salt trade between the south and north. The name Taberesheim first appeared in 885, later evolving into variations like Tafersheim and Tabersheim. Initially, the Tafersheim area encompassed settlements on both sides of the Danube, including St. Peter and Zizlau. A church in Tafersheim, dated to 1111, is regarded as the predecessor of the current parish church in Steyregg. By the 17th century, the name Tafersheim became less common and eventually referred to the Steyregg hospital in the 19th century. After the hospital's demolition in 1936, the name Tafersheim faded from use.

Steyregg

Construction of a castle in Steyregg likely began around 1150, with the town's name first linked to the castrum Steyrheke. The castle was expanded over time and changed hands frequently. Steyregg gained market status in the 13th century and city rights in 1482, but remained overshadowed by Linz and influenced by nearby agricultural communities.

In the late 19th century, the Summerauer railway and a bridge over the Danube spurred modest growth. During World War II, the town's population faced hardships due to the nearby Hermann Göring works in Linz, which were bombed by the Allies. In recent decades, Steyregg became known for its environmental activism against heavy industry emissions. In the early 21st century, Schloss Steyregg was renovated after being vacant for 200 years. In 2007, the town hosted the Water Ski World Championships.

== Population ==
Historical population
Year	Pop.	±%
1869	1,705	—
1880	1,708	+0.2%
1890	1,765	+3.3%
1900	1,709	−3.2%
1910	1,773	+3.7%
1923	1,864	+5.1%
1934	1,986	+6.5%
1939	2,056	+3.5%
1951	2,270	+10.4%
1961	2,825	+24.4%
1971	3,805	+34.7%
1981	4,394	+15.5%
1991	4,536	+3.2%
2001	4,749	+4.7%
2011	4,764	+0.3%
