= Gallneukirchen =

Gallneukirchen Goineikircha
- Municipality
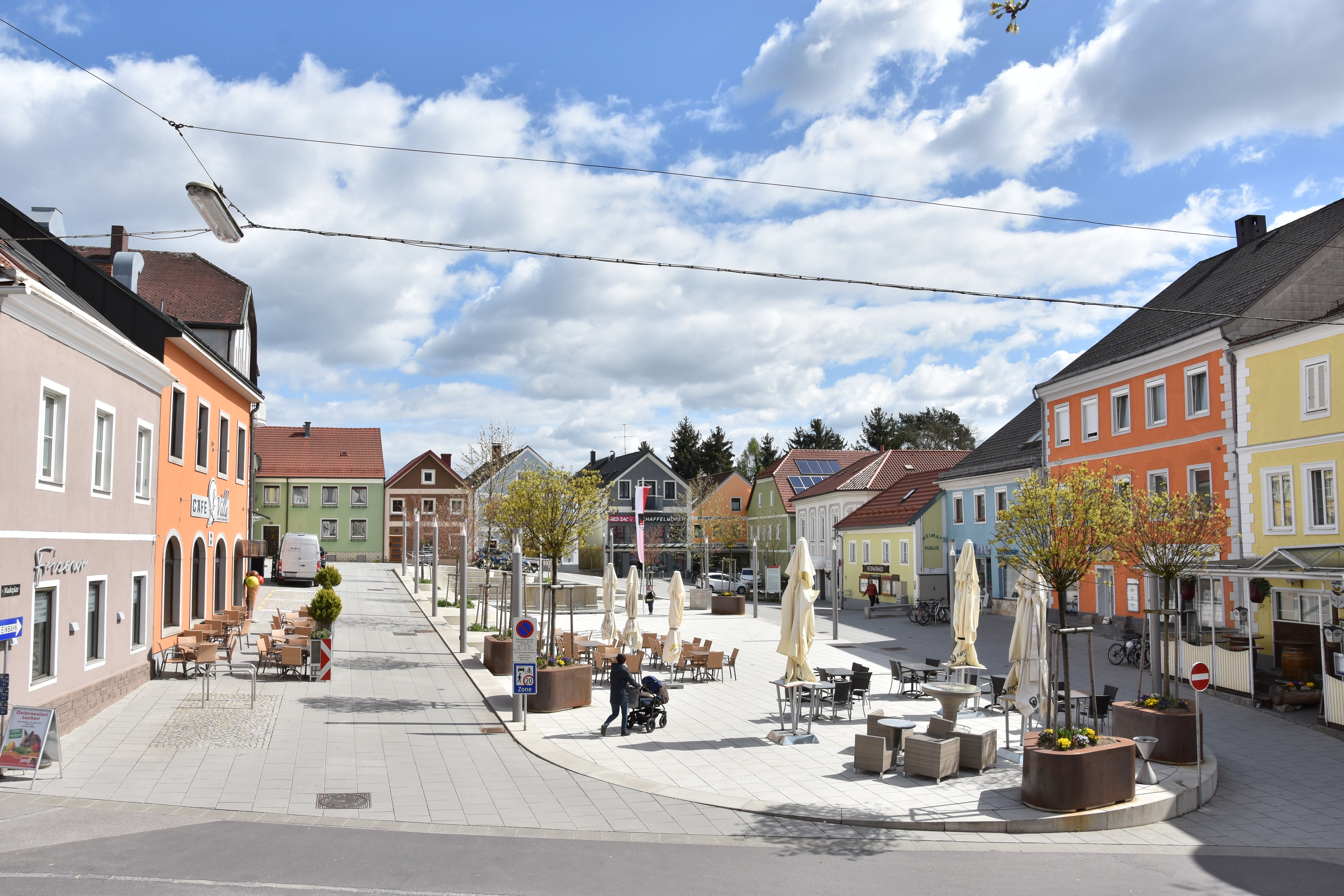
- Market Square in Gallneukirchen

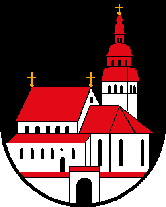
- Coat of arms

- Location within Austria
- Coordinates: 48°21′11.61″N 14°24′58.57″E
- Country: Austria
- State: Upper Austria
- District: Urfahr-Umgebung

Government
  - Mayor: Josef Wall-Strasser (SPÖ)

Area
  - Total: 5.18 km^{2} (2.00 sq mi)
- Elevation: 337 m (1,106 ft)

Population (2018-01-01)
  - Total: 6,492
  - Density: 1,250/km^{2} (3,250/sq mi)
- Time zone: UTC+1 (CET)
  - Summer (DST): UTC+2 (CEST)
- Postal code: 4210
- Area code: 07235
- Vehicle registration: UU
- Website: www.gallneukirchen.at

Gallneukirchen (Central Bavarian: Goineikircha) is a small town in the Austrian state of Upper Austria and is part of the district Urfahr-Umgebung.

== Motto ==
Experience the city, enjoy the land – "Stadt erleben Land genießen (original)"

== History ==
In the year 1125, it was mentioned for the first time in a documentary as "Novenkirchen". At that time Gallneukirchen was just a market. Originally lying in the East part of the duchy of Bavaria (Germany), in the 12th century it belonged to the duchy "Austria", and in the year 1211, the market was included in the diocese of Passau for the next 200 years. In 1411, the brothers Caspar and Gundakar bought it from the Starhemberg family. Since 1490, it has belonged to the principality of "Österreich ob der Enns".
During the Napoleonic Wars it was occupied several times, and now belongs to Upper Austria.
From 1832 to 1872 the Horse railway transported Goods and persons through Gallneukirchen.
In 1985 Gallneukirchen became a European municipality and 1992 Gallneukirchen incurred a partnership with Northeim in Lower Saxony.
The last large change was when Gallneukirchen became a city on 5 March 2001.

== Population ==
Historical population
Year	Pop.	±%
1869	1,509	—
1880	1,586	+5.1%
1890	1,546	−2.5%
1900	1,666	+7.8%
1910	1,780	+6.8%
1923	1,854	+4.2%
1934	2,105	+13.5%
1939	2,207	+4.8%
1951	2,549	+15.5%
1961	2,742	+7.6%
1971	3,661	+33.5%
1981	4,398	+20.1%
1991	5,114	+16.3%
2001	5,915	+15.7%
2011	6,244	+5.6%

== Geography ==
Gallneukirchen is at a height of 337 m at the lower part of the Mühlviertel. The dimension from north to south are 2.9 km and from west to east are 3 km.

=== Neighbours ===
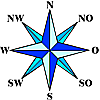
Altenberg bei Linz	Alberndorf in der Riedmark	Unterweitersdorf
		Wartberg ob der Aist
Linz		Engerwitzdorf

=== Rivers ===
The river Gusen flows through Gallneukirchen.

== Politics ==
=== Constitution of the town council ===
Election results of 28 September 2003

eligible to vote: 4609 +597, valid votes: 3480 +397, invalid: 110 −20, voter turnout: 77,9% −0,2%

Party	%		votes		Mandate	
ÖVP	38,0%	−4,3%	1324	+21	12	−2
SPÖ	36,8%	+6,7%	1281	+354	12	+2
Grüne	20,5%	+6,2%	715	+354	6	+2
FPÖ	4,6%	−7,3%	160	−207	1	−2
KPÖ	0,0%	−1,4%	0	−44	0	±0

=== City partnership ===
- Northeim in German.

== Environment and infrastructure ==
=== Traffic ===
- motorway A7 Mühlkreis Autobahn
- Busline

=== Public facilities ===
- big open air swimming pool with red slide
- Senior living and care center
- Youth center
- Fitness studio "Feel Well"

=== Accumulation ===
- Kindergarten
- Schools

== Schools ==
There are eight schools in the Gallneukirchen:

- one primary school,
- one elementary school,
- two middle schools (HS1, NMS2),
- one polytechnic (located in Riedegg 2 km away from Gallneukirchen),
- one high school with focus on training for people who take care of people with disabilities (LHB),
- one school for people with disabilities (Martin Boos Schule)
- and one music school, although a new music school is being built close by which will cause heavy traffic problems because there is no parking space in its surrounding.

== Kindergarten ==
There are two kindergartens. One is located at the top of the "Linzerberg"

== Personalities ==
=== Honorary citizens ===
- Walter Hanl, Goldmedal Judoka

== Sport ==
- SVG: With almost 2,000 members in 15 sections, the sports club Gallneukirchen (SVG) is the largest of the "Urfahr Umgebung" district. It consists of the sections soccer, tennis, skiing, judo, chess, disabled sports, stick sports, triathlon, women's gymnastics, handball, athletics, swimming, table tennis and some more.
  The association was founded in 1948. Nationally known soccer players like Karl Irndorfer and Michael Mehlem are from Gallneukirchens SVG.
- There are also options to join a climbing club with a climbing hall in the Tennis Center of Gallneukirchen
