= Haibach im Mühlkreis =

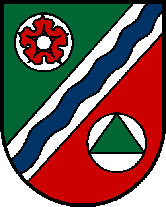
- Coat of arms

- Location within Austria
- Coordinates: 48°26′41″N 14°21′32″E
- Country: Austria
- State: Upper Austria
- District: Urfahr-Umgebung

Government
  - Mayor: Josef Reingruber (ÖVP)

Area
  - Total: 14.48 km^{2} (5.59 sq mi)
- Elevation: 780 m (2,560 ft)

Population (2018-01-01)
  - Total: 904
  - Density: 62.4/km^{2} (162/sq mi)
- Time zone: UTC+1 (CET)
  - Summer (DST): UTC+2 (CEST)
- Postal code: 4204
- Area code: 07211
- Vehicle registration: UU
- Website: www.iris.at/ gemeinde/haibach

Haibach im Mühlkreis is a municipality in the district of Urfahr-Umgebung in the Austrian state of Upper Austria.

== Population ==
Historical population
Year	Pop.	±%
1991	668	—
2001	783	+17.2%
