= Zwettl an der Rodl =

- Municipality
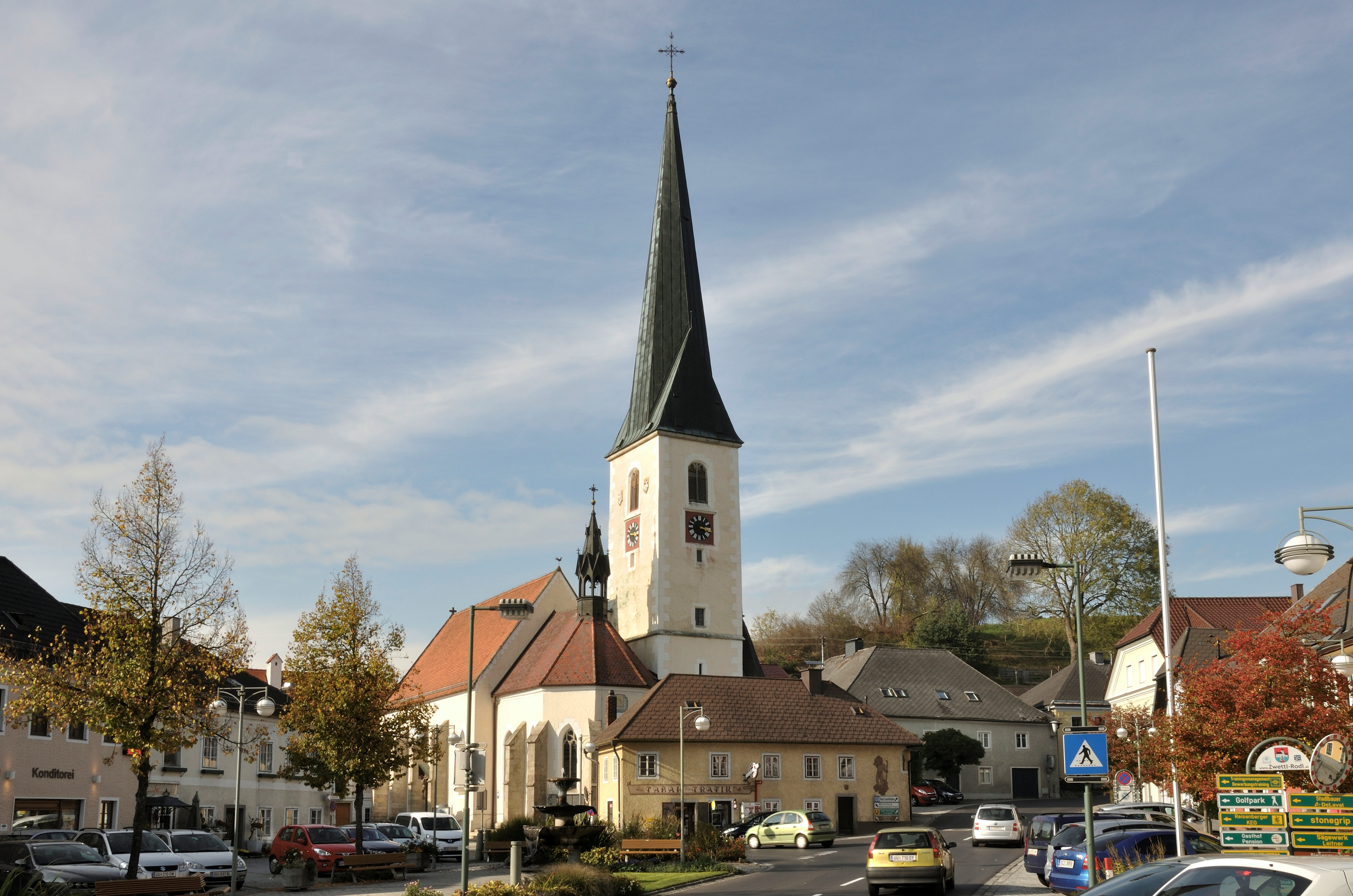

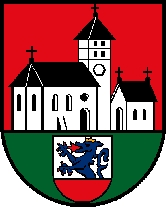
- Coat of arms

- Location within Austria
- Coordinates: 48°28′00″N 14°16′02″E
- Country: Austria
- State: Upper Austria
- District: Urfahr-Umgebung

Government
  - Mayor: Arnold Weixelbaumer (ÖVP)

Area
  - Total: 15.36 km^{2} (5.93 sq mi)
- Elevation: 616 m (2,021 ft)

Population (2018-01-01)
  - Total: 1,752
  - Density: 114.1/km^{2} (295.4/sq mi)
- Time zone: UTC+1 (CET)
  - Summer (DST): UTC+2 (CEST)
- Postal code: 4180
- Area code: 0 72 12
- Vehicle registration: UU
- Website: www.zwettl-rodl.ooe.gv.at

Zwettl an der Rodl (Central Bavarian: Zwe'l aun da Ro'l) is a municipality in the district of Urfahr-Umgebung in the Austrian state of Upper Austria.

== Population ==
Historical population
Year	Pop.	±%
1991	1,630	—
2001	1,783	+9.4%
2012	1,725	−3.3%
