= Schenkenfelden =

- Municipality
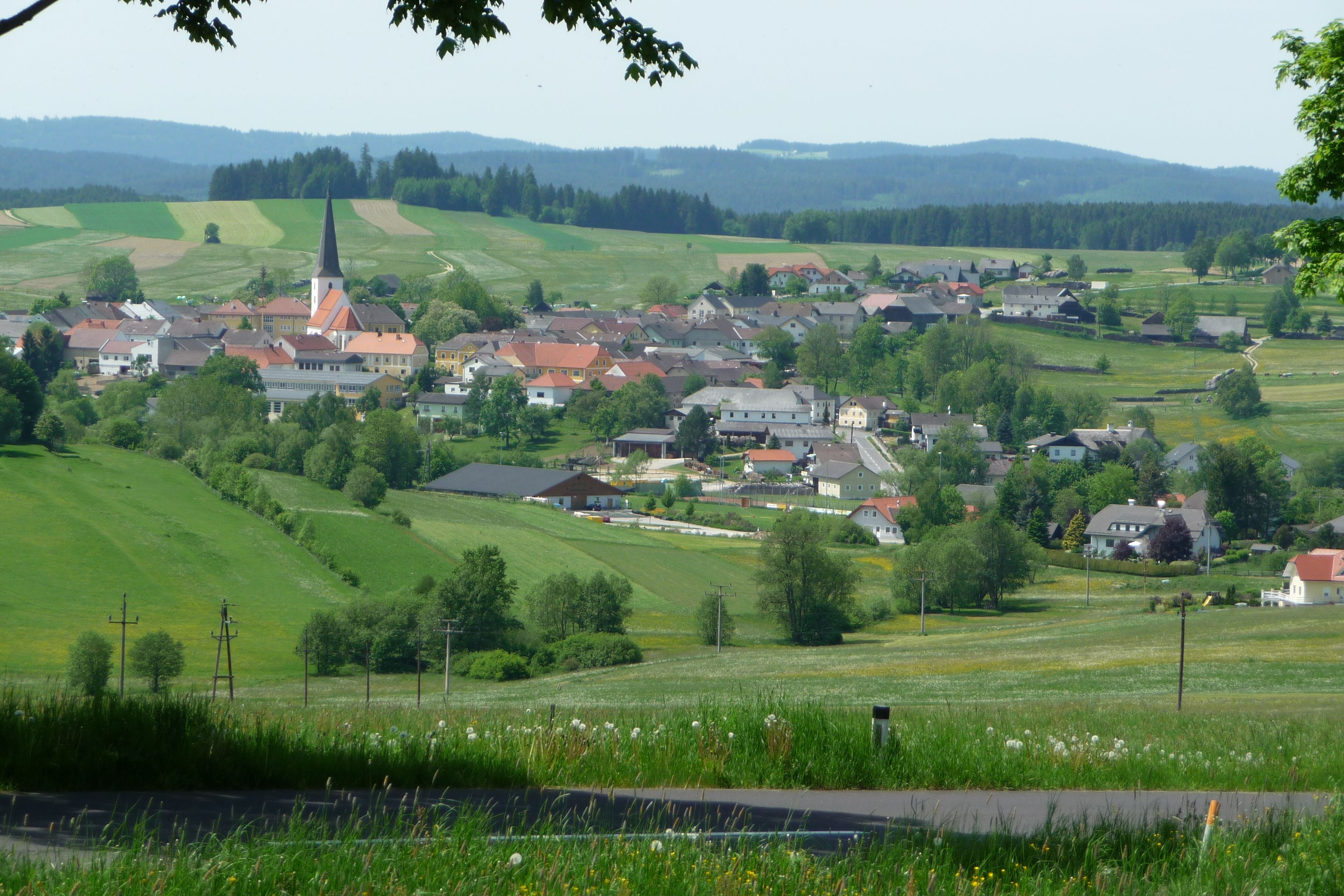

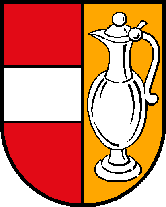
- Coat of arms

- Location within Austria
- Coordinates: 48°30′01″N 14°21′46″E
- Country: Austria
- State: Upper Austria
- District: Urfahr-Umgebung

Government
  - Mayor: Doris Leitner (ÖVP)

Area
  - Total: 25.65 km^{2} (9.90 sq mi)
- Elevation: 734 m (2,408 ft)

Population (2018-01-01)
  - Total: 1,569
  - Density: 61.17/km^{2} (158.4/sq mi)
- Time zone: UTC+1 (CET)
  - Summer (DST): UTC+2 (CEST)
- Postal code: 4192
- Area code: 07214
- Vehicle registration: UU
- Website: www.schenkenfelden.at

Schenkenfelden is a municipality in the district of Urfahr-Umgebung in the Austrian state of Upper Austria.

== Population ==
Historical population
Year	Pop.	±%
1991	1,343	—
2001	1,507	+12.2%
2012	1,535	+1.9%
