= Überlendner-Siedlung =

Coordinates: 48°21′05″N 14°10′24″E

The Überlendner-Siedlung is a village in Upper Austria, Austria. Part of the municipality of Gramastetten, it is located a few kilometres from Walding.
