= Blatnička =

- Municipality
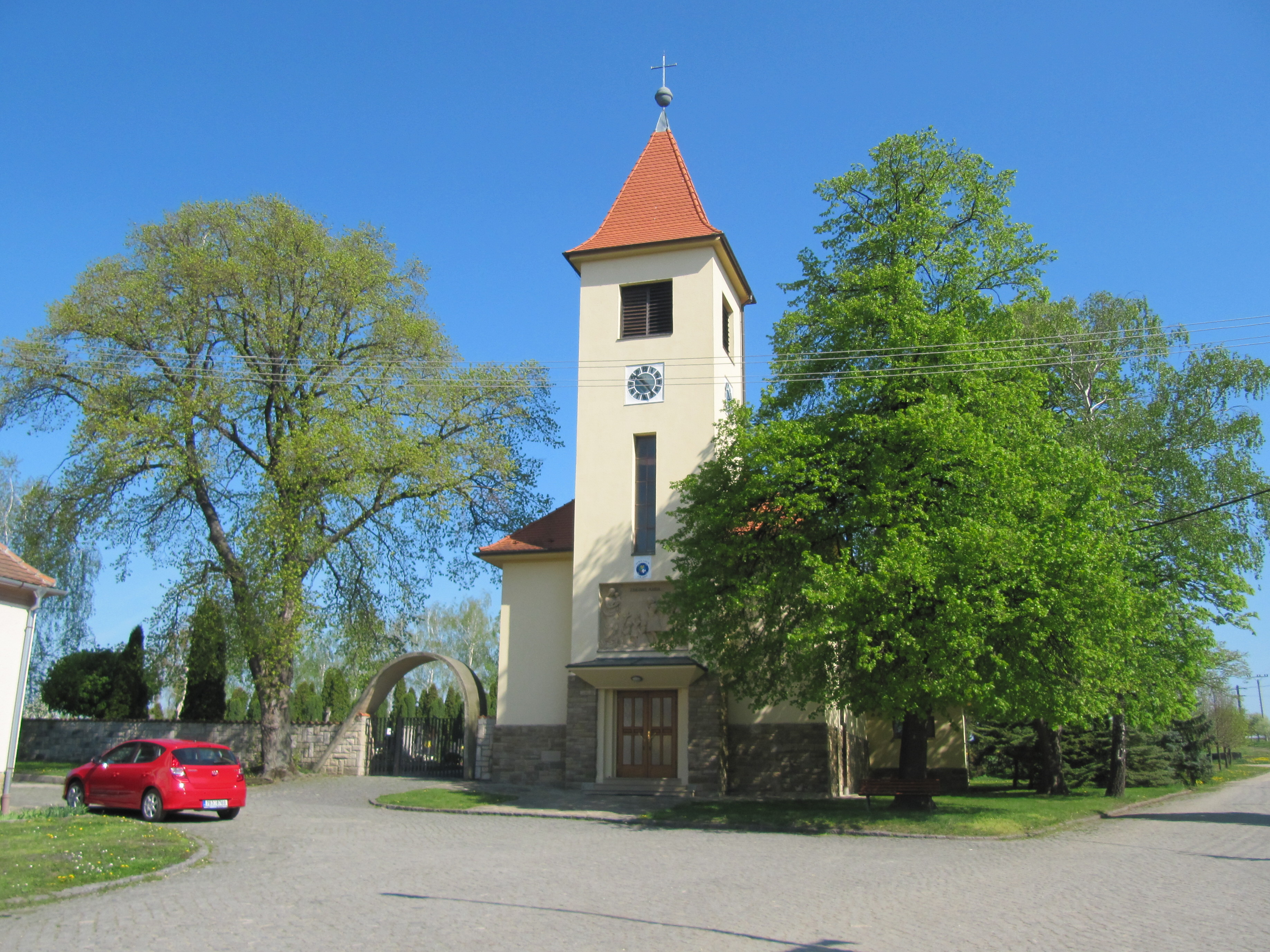
- Church of the Assumption of the Virgin Mary

- Flag Coat of arms

- Location in the Czech Republic
- Coordinates: 48°56′8″N 17°31′48″E
- Country: Czech Republic
- Region: South Moravian
- District: Hodonín
- First mentioned: 1362

Area
  - Total: 8.82 km^{2} (3.41 sq mi)
- Elevation: 263 m (863 ft)

Population (2026-01-01)
  - Total: 440
  - Density: 50/km^{2} (130/sq mi)
- Time zone: UTC+1 (CET)
  - Summer (DST): UTC+2 (CEST)
- Postal code: 696 71
- Website: www.obecblatnicka.cz

Blatnička is a municipality and village in Hodonín District in the South Moravian Region of the Czech Republic. It has about 400 inhabitants.

== Demographics ==
Historical population
Year	Pop.	±%
1869	386	—
1880	410	+6.2%
1890	435	+6.1%
1900	468	+7.6%
1910	518	+10.7%
1921	492	−5.0%
1930	539	+9.6%
1950	494	−8.3%
1961	529	+7.1%
1970	538	+1.7%
1980	542	+0.7%
1991	498	−8.1%
2001	449	−9.8%
2011	428	−4.7%
2021	397	−7.2%
Source: Censuses

== Economy ==
Blatnička is known for viticulture and wine production. The municipality lies in the Slovácká wine subregion.

== Twin towns – sister cities ==
Blatnička is twinned with:

- Falkenstein, Austria
