= Yspertal =

- Municipality
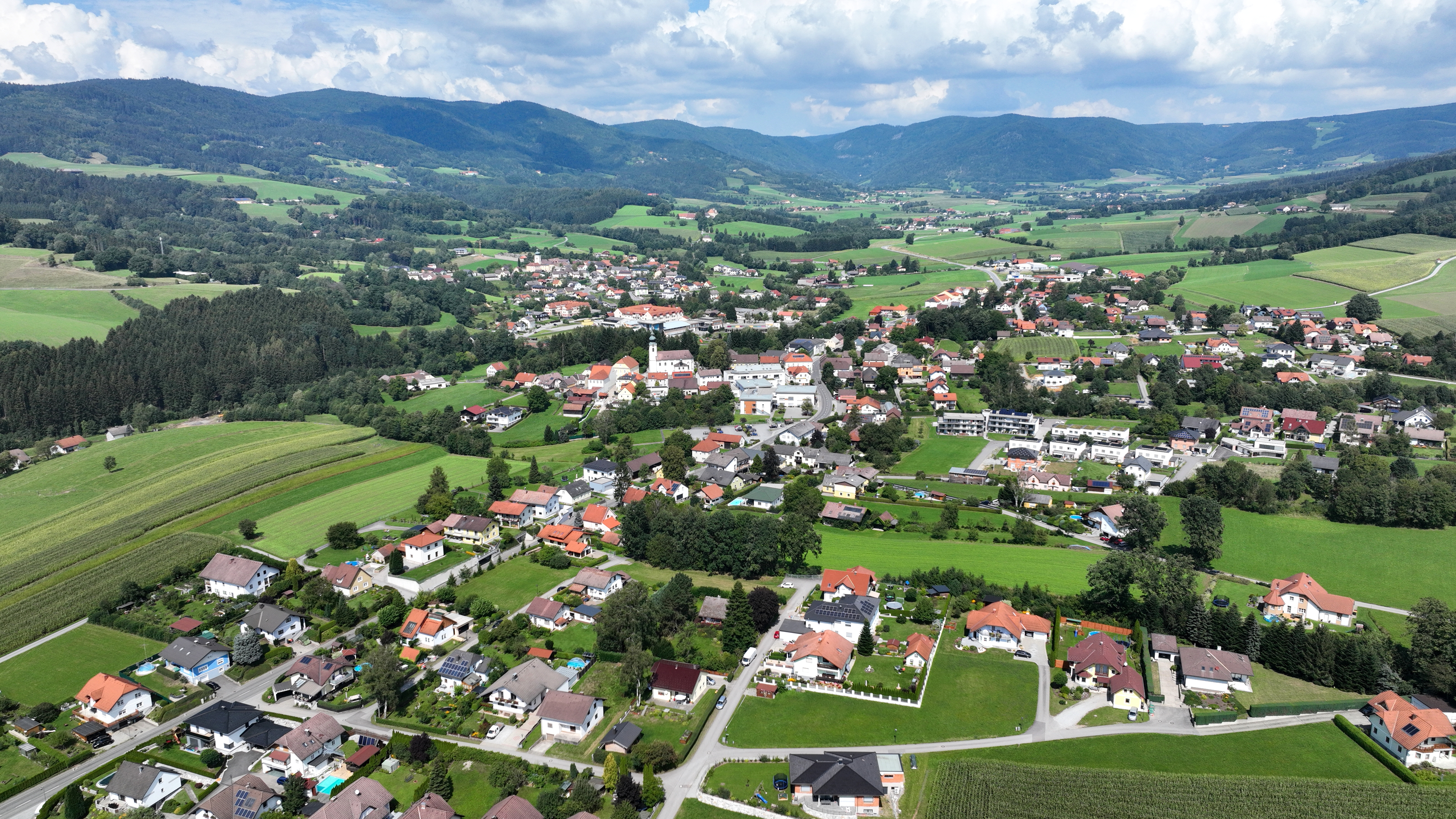
- South view of Yspertal in Lower Austria

- Coat of arms

- Location within Austria
- Coordinates: 48°17′N 15°4′E
- Country: Austria
- State: Lower Austria
- District: Melk

Government
  - Mayor: Veronika Schroll (ÖVP)

Area
  - Total: 47.67 km^{2} (18.41 sq mi)
- Elevation: 498 m (1,634 ft)

Population (2018-01-01)
  - Total: 2,007
  - Density: 42.10/km^{2} (109.0/sq mi)
- Time zone: UTC+1 (CET)
  - Summer (DST): UTC+2 (CEST)
- Postal code: 3683
- Area code: 07415
- Website: www.yspertal.gv.at

Yspertal is a town in the district of Melk in the Austrian state of Lower Austria.

== Population ==
Historical population
Year	Pop.	±%
1971	1,933	—
1981	1,995	+3.2%
1991	1,834	−8.1%
2001	1,900	+3.6%
