= Reichenau im Mühlkreis =

- Municipality
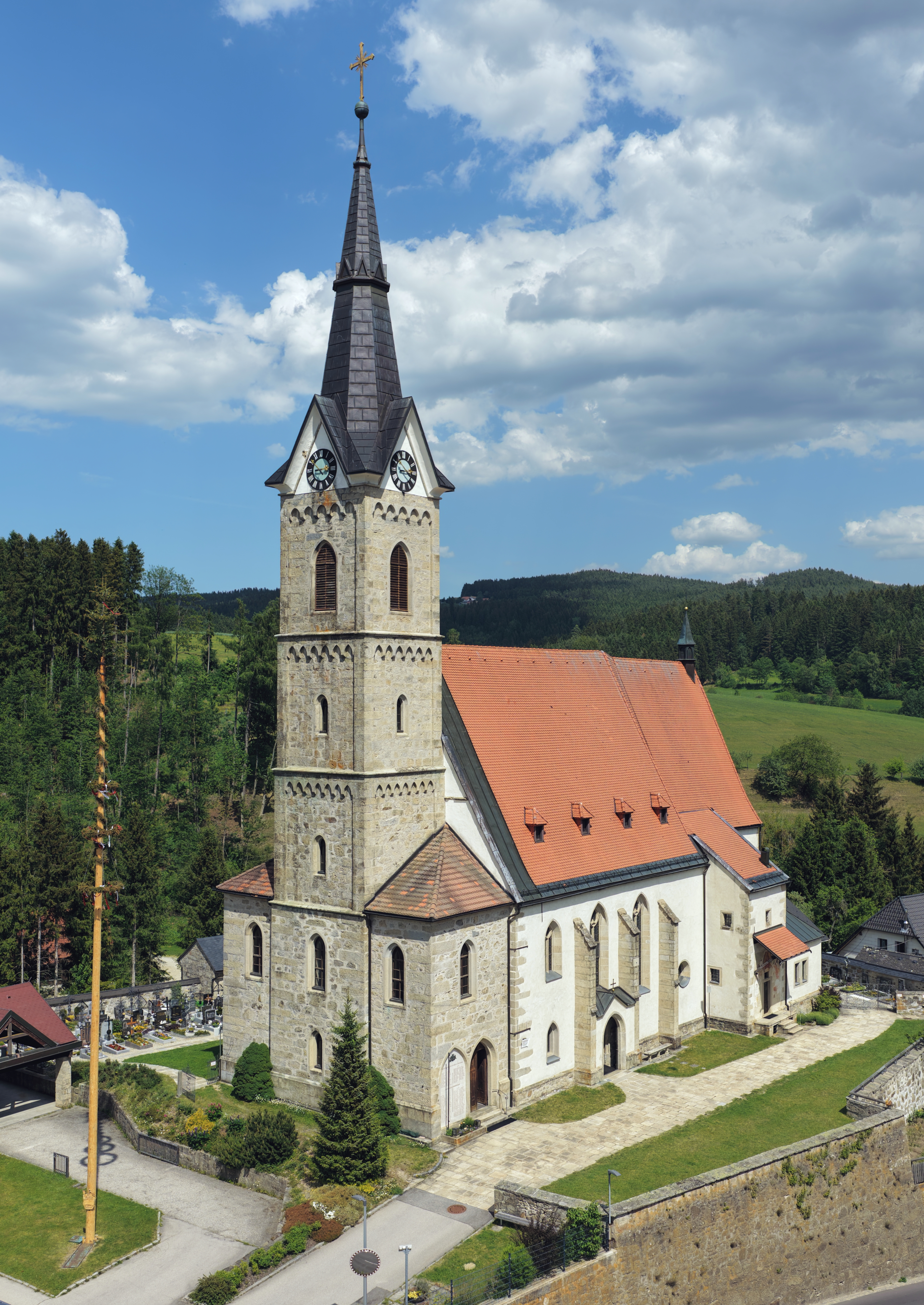
- Church of Saint John the Baptist

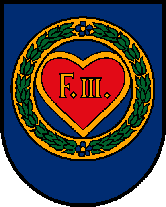
- Coat of arms

- Location within Austria
- Coordinates: 48°27′23″N 14°21′01″E
- Country: Austria
- State: Upper Austria
- District: Urfahr-Umgebung

Government
  - Mayor: Hermann Reingruber (ÖVP)

Area
  - Total: 9.54 km^{2} (3.68 sq mi)
- Elevation: 667 m (2,188 ft)

Population (2018-01-01)
  - Total: 1,329
  - Density: 139/km^{2} (361/sq mi)
- Time zone: UTC+1 (CET)
  - Summer (DST): UTC+2 (CEST)
- Postal code: 4204
- Area code: 07211
- Vehicle registration: UU
- Website: http://www.reichenau-ooe.at/

Reichenau im Mühlkreis is a municipality in the district of Urfahr-Umgebung in the Austrian state of Upper Austria.

== Population ==
Historical population
| Year | Pop. | ±% |
|---|---|---|
| 1991 | 904 | — |
| 2001 | 1,162 | +28.5% |
