= Urfahr-Umgebung District =

District in Upper Austria

Coordinates: 48.407°N 14.278°E

Urfahr-Umgebung District Urfahr-Umgebung
- District
- Country: Austria
- State: Upper Austria
- Number of municipalities: 27
- Administrative seat: Linz

Government
  - District Governor: Paul Gruber

Area
  - Total: 649.3 km^{2} (250.7 sq mi)

Population (2001)
  - Total: 77,742
  - Density: 119.7/km^{2} (310.1/sq mi)
- Time zone: UTC+01:00 (CET)
  - Summer (DST): UTC+02:00 (CEST)
- Vehicle registration: UU

Urfahr-Umgebung (German pronunciation: [bəˈtsɪʁk ˌuːɐ̯faːɐ̯ʔʊmˈɡeːbʊŋ]) is a district of the state of Upper Austria in Austria. Formerly known as Urfahr, it was a town in its own right, but later became a borough of Linz, Upper Austria's administrative center (Bezirkshauptmannschaft).

== Municipalities ==
Towns (Städte) are indicated in boldface; market towns (Marktgemeinden) in italics.

- Alberndorf in der Riedmark
- Altenberg bei Linz
- **Bad Leonfelden**
- Eidenberg
- Engerwitzdorf
- Feldkirchen an der Donau
- **Gallneukirchen**
- Goldwörth
- Gramastetten
- Haibach im Mühlkreis
- Hellmonsödt
- Herzogsdorf
- Kirchschlag bei Linz
- Lichtenberg
- Oberneukirchen
- Ottenschlag im Mühlkreis
- Ottensheim
- Puchenau
- Reichenau im Mühlkreis
- Reichenthal
- Schenkenfelden
- Sonnberg im Mühlkreis
- Sankt Gotthard im Mühlkreis
- **Steyregg**
- Vorderweißenbach
- Walding
- Zwettl an der Rodl
