= Lichtenberg, Austria =

Lichtenberg
- Municipality
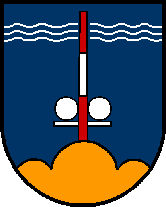
- Coat of arms

- Location within Austria
- Coordinates: 48°21′36″N 14°15′29″E
- Country: Austria
- State: Upper Austria
- District: Urfahr-Umgebung

Government
  - Mayor: Daniela Durstberger (ÖVP)

Area
  - Total: 18.49 km^{2} (7.14 sq mi)
- Elevation: 622 m (2,041 ft)

Population (2018-01-01)
  - Total: 2,637
  - Density: 142.6/km^{2} (369.4/sq mi)
- Time zone: UTC+1 (CET)
  - Summer (DST): UTC+2 (CEST)
- Postal code: 4040
- Area code: 07239
- Vehicle registration: UU
- Website: www.lichtenberg. ooe.gv.at

Lichtenberg (Austrian German pronunciation: [ˈlɪçtn̩bɛrɡ]) is a municipality in the district of Urfahr-Umgebung in the Austrian state of Upper Austria.

== Population ==
Historical population
Year	Pop.	±%
1869	773	—
1880	779	+0.8%
1890	798	+2.4%
1900	807	+1.1%
1910	814	+0.9%
1923	784	−3.7%
1934	796	+1.5%
1939	790	−0.8%
1951	899	+13.8%
1961	1,007	+12.0%
1971	1,206	+19.8%
1981	1,554	+28.9%
1991	2,147	+38.2%
2001	2,389	+11.3%
2011	2,588	+8.3%
