= Alberndorf in der Riedmark =

- Municipality
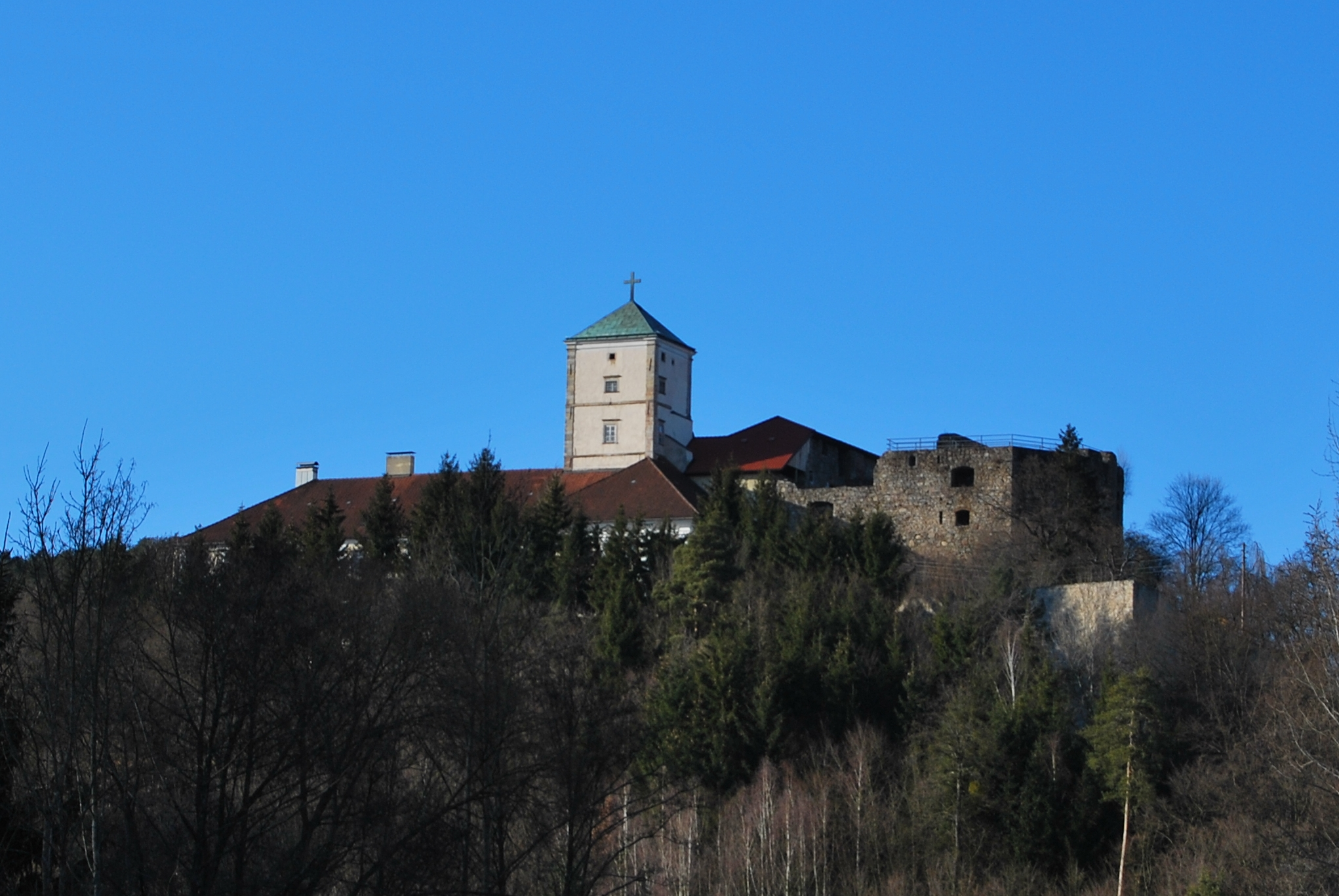
- Riedegg castle

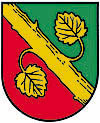
- Coat of arms

- Location within Austria
- Coordinates: 48°24′24″N 14°25′01″E
- Country: Austria
- State: Upper Austria
- District: Urfahr-Umgebung

Government
  - Mayor: Josef Moser (ÖVP)

Area
  - Total: 40.45 km^{2} (15.62 sq mi)
- Elevation: 570 m (1,870 ft)

Population (2018-01-01)
  - Total: 4,083
  - Density: 100.9/km^{2} (261.4/sq mi)
- Time zone: UTC+1 (CET)
  - Summer (DST): UTC+2 (CEST)
- Postal code: 4211
- Area code: 07235
- Vehicle registration: UU
- Website: www.alberndorf.at

Alberndorf in der Riedmark is a municipality in the district of Urfahr-Umgebung in the Austrian state of Upper Austria.

== Population ==
Historical population
Year	Pop.	±%
1991	3,159	—
2001	3,584	+13.5%
