= Puchenau =

- Municipality
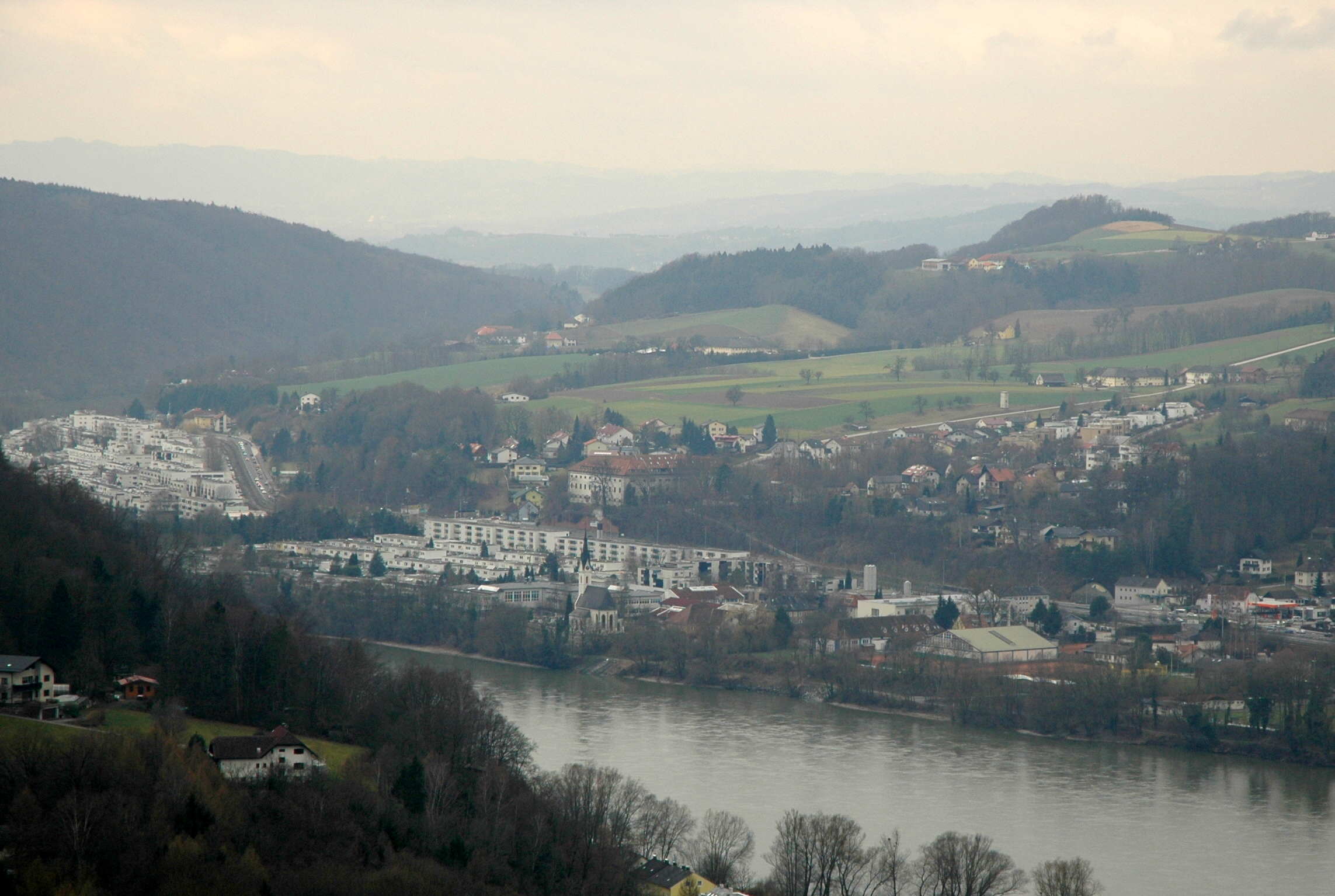

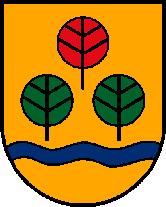
- Coat of arms

- Location within Austria
- Coordinates: 48°18′39″N 14°14′29″E
- Country: Austria
- State: Upper Austria
- District: Urfahr-Umgebung

Government
  - Mayor: Gerald Schimböck (ÖVP)

Area
  - Total: 8.19 km^{2} (3.16 sq mi)
- Elevation: 265 m (869 ft)

Population (2018-01-01)
  - Total: 4,445
  - Density: 543/km^{2} (1,410/sq mi)
- Time zone: UTC+1 (CET)
  - Summer (DST): UTC+2 (CEST)
- Postal code: 4048, 4040
- Area code: 0 732, 0 72 34
- Vehicle registration: UU
- Website: www.puchenau.at

Puchenau is a municipality in the district of Urfahr-Umgebung in the Austrian state of Upper Austria. Until 1893 it was part of the neighbouring town of Ottensheim.

== Population ==
Historical population
Year	Pop.	±%
1981	3,368	—
1991	4,718	+40.1%
2001	4,674	−0.9%

It has a population of around 4400 people.
