= Bad Leonfelden =

- Municipality
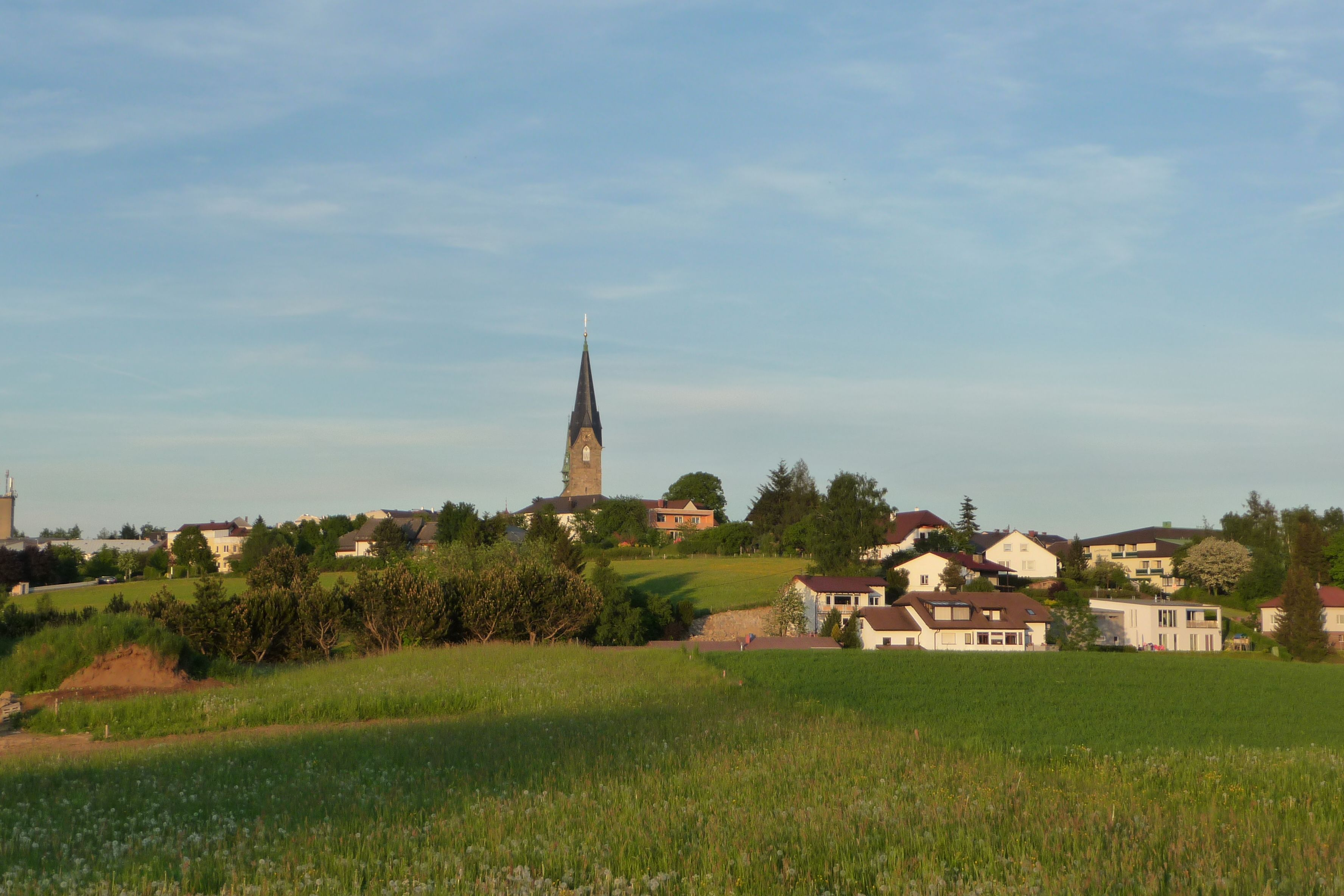

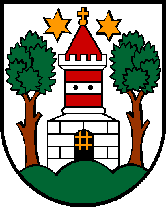
- Coat of arms

- Location within Austria
- Coordinates: 48°31′31″N 14°17′36″E
- Country: Austria
- State: Upper Austria
- District: Urfahr-Umgebung

Government
  - Mayor: Thomas Wolfesberger (ÖVP)

Area
  - Total: 40.33 km^{2} (15.57 sq mi)
- Elevation: 750 m (2,460 ft)

Population (2018-01-01)
  - Total: 4,180
  - Density: 104/km^{2} (268/sq mi)
- Time zone: UTC+1 (CET)
  - Summer (DST): UTC+2 (CEST)
- Postal code: 4190
- Area code: 07213
- Vehicle registration: UU
- Website: www.bad-leonfelden.ooe.gv.at

Bad Leonfelden is a municipality in the district of Urfahr-Umgebung in the Austrian state of Upper Austria. Steven Beller, author of A Concise History of Austria, who has family links to Bad Leonfelden, cites episodes from the town's history from its foundation in 1292 to the 21st century, to demonstrate the impact of historical and political events on the local life in Austria's rural provinces. The Jugendstil mosaicist Leopold Forstner was born there.

== Geography ==
The centre of Bad Leonfelden is 28 kilometres (17 mi) north of the provincial capital Linz and 6 kilometres (3.7 mi) south of the state border with the Czech Republic in the Upper Mühlviertel. The Weigetschlag/Studánky border crossing leads to the town of Vyšší Brod, 13 kilometres (8.1 mi) to the north in the Czech Republic.

The municipal area covers an area of 40.33 square kilometres (15.57 sq mi), at its widest 6.6 kilometres (4.1 mi) east-west and 10.7 kilometres (6.6 mi) north-south.

The highest elevation is on the eastern slope of the Sternstein at around 970 m above sea level near the village of Oberstern and the lowest point at around 675 m above sea level near the border to the village of Schönau in the municipality of Zwettl an der Rodl. The centre of Bad Leonfelden is 750 m above sea level.

Bad Leonfelden stands on the Granite and Gneiss Plateau, the Austrian part of the Bohemian Massif.

== Population ==
Historical population
Year	Pop.	±%
1869	2,805	—
1880	2,790	−0.5%
1890	2,894	+3.7%
1900	2,795	−3.4%
1910	2,698	−3.5%
1923	2,609	−3.3%
1934	2,466	−5.5%
1939	2,730	+10.7%
1951	2,617	−4.1%
1961	2,546	−2.7%
1971	2,712	+6.5%
1981	3,048	+12.4%
1991	3,419	+12.2%
2001	3,847	+12.5%
2011	4,064	+5.6%
