= Strýčice =

- Municipality
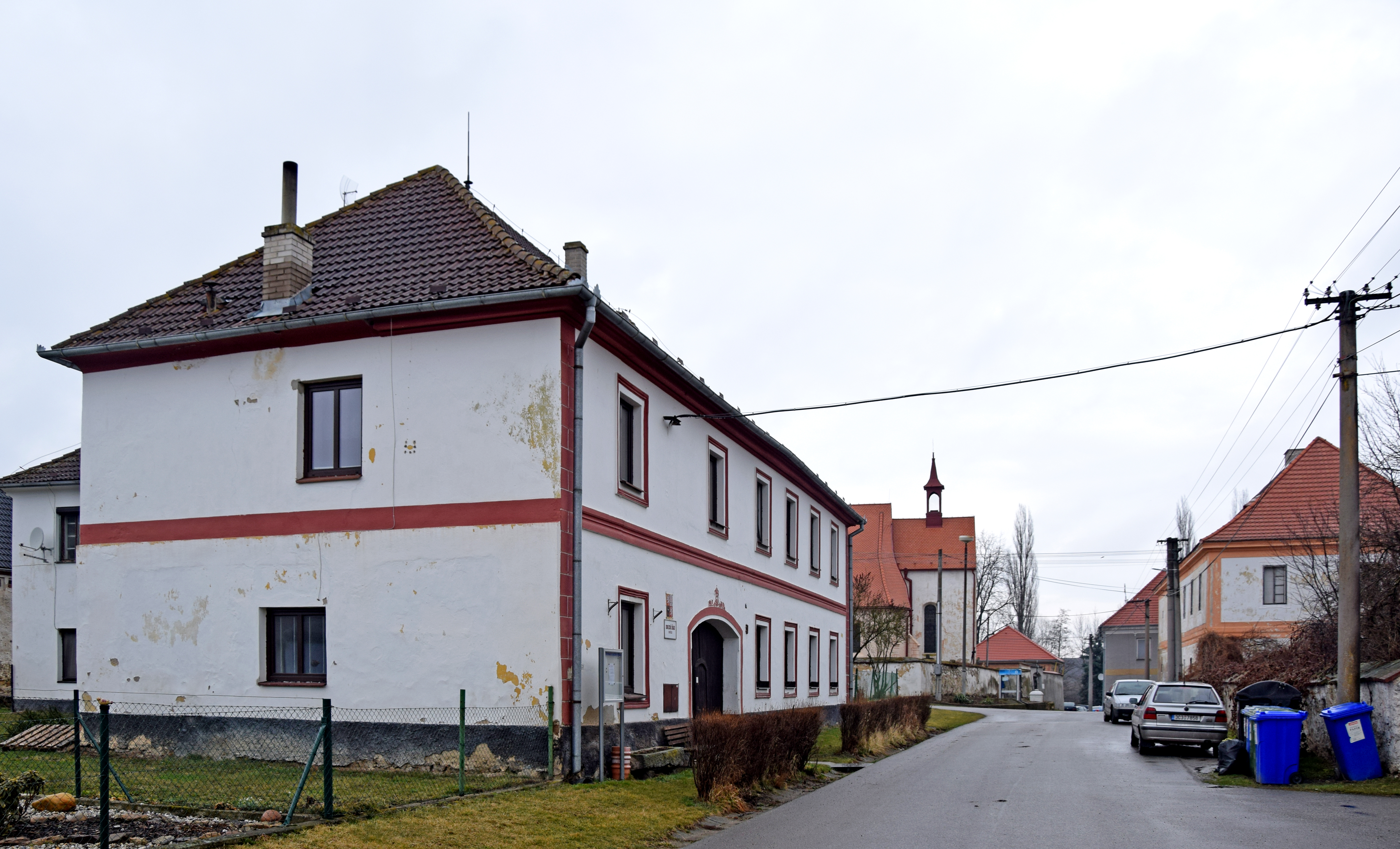
- Municipal office

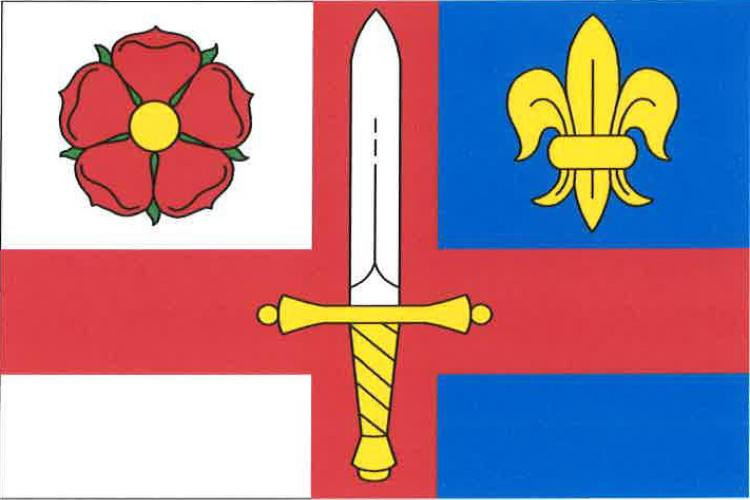
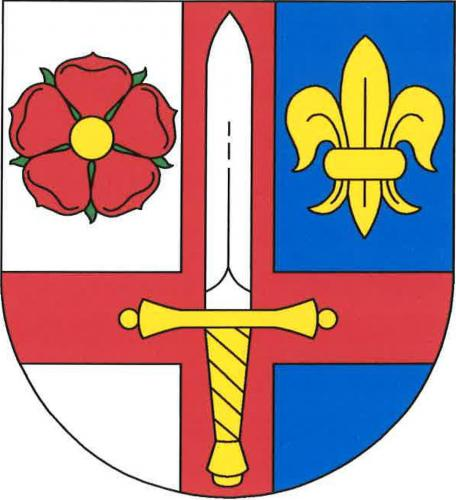
- Flag Coat of arms

- Location in the Czech Republic
- Coordinates: 49°0′43″N 14°15′56″E
- Country: Czech Republic
- Region: South Bohemian
- District: České Budějovice
- First mentioned: 1292

Area
  - Total: 0.64 km^{2} (0.25 sq mi)
- Elevation: 423 m (1,388 ft)

Population (2026-01-01)
  - Total: 48
  - Density: 75/km^{2} (190/sq mi)
- Time zone: UTC+1 (CET)
  - Summer (DST): UTC+2 (CEST)
- Postal code: 373 41
- Website: www.obecstrycice.cz

Strýčice (German: Stritschitz) is a municipality and village in České Budějovice District in the South Bohemian Region of the Czech Republic. It has about 50 inhabitants.

== Geography ==
Strýčice is located about 15 kilometres (9 mi) west of České Budějovice. It lies in a flat agricultural landscape, on the border between the České Budějovice Basin and Bohemian Forest Foothills. The highest point is at 438 m (1,437 ft) above sea level. The area is rich in fishponds.

With an area of 0.64 km^{2} (0.25 sq mi), Strýčice is the third smallest municipality in the country.

== History ==
The first written mention of Strýčice is from 1292, when King Wenceslaus II handed over the village to the Vyšší Brod Monastery in exchange for other properties.

== Demographics ==
Historical population

| Year | Pop. | ±% |
|---|---|---|
| 1869 | 92 | — |
| 1880 | 91 | −1.1% |
| 1890 | 88 | −3.3% |
| 1900 | 78 | −11.4% |
| 1910 | 74 | −5.1% |

| Year | Pop. | ±% |
|---|---|---|
| 1921 | 80 | +8.1% |
| 1930 | 83 | +3.8% |
| 1950 | 64 | −22.9% |
| 1961 | 91 | +42.2% |
| 1970 | 102 | +12.1% |

| Year | Pop. | ±% |
|---|---|---|
| 1980 | 75 | −26.5% |
| 1991 | 59 | −21.3% |
| 2001 | 50 | −15.3% |
| 2011 | 53 | +6.0% |
| 2021 | 55 | +3.8% |

Source: Censuses

== Transport ==
There are no railways or major roads passing through the municipality.

== Sights ==
The main landmark of Strýčice is the Church of Saints Peter and Paul. Originally a Romanesque building, it is as old as the village. It was rebuilt in the late Gothic style and the tower was added in the Baroque era.

A valuable technical monument is the so-called Reitinger Mill. This watermill was built in 1843–1845 and has preserved functional technological equipment.
