= Franciscan Madonna =

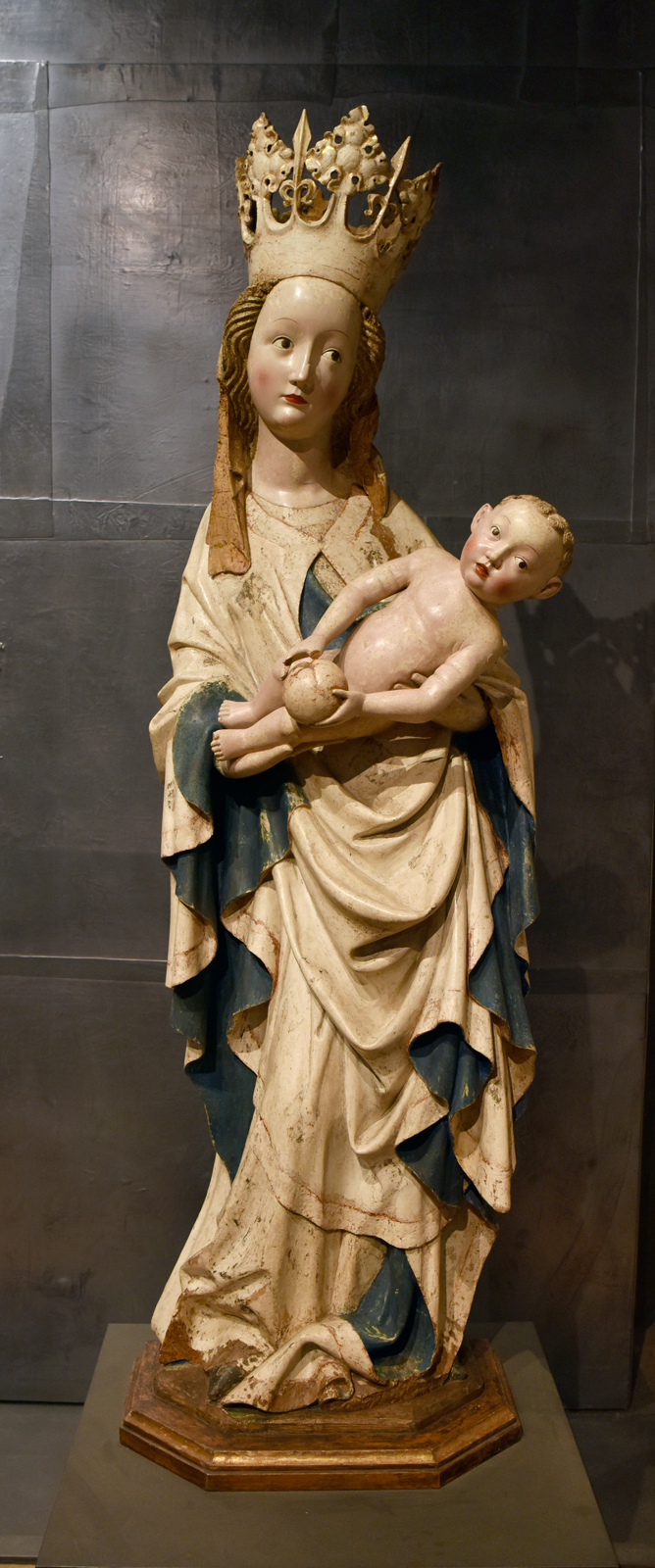
Franciscan Madonna (c. 1415 or 1430), National Gallery in Prague

The Franciscan Madonna (c. 1415 or 1430) is a monumental carving of the late beautiful style, which is compositionally related to the Plzeň Madonna. In some details, it resembles works from the circle of the Master of Týn Calvary. The statue comes from the main altar of the Church of the Assumption of the Virgin Mary of the Franciscan Monastery in Plzeň and is on display in the exposition of medieval art of the National Gallery in Prague.

== Description and classification ==
Slightly larger than life-size, free-standing linden wood statue, worked in the rear, height with base 191 cm. The carving of the wooden block made of six parts is perfect. The polychromy is more recent and probably dates from 1641, when Mathauss Augustin Kacerowski from Doro had a new crown of Mary made, or 1692, when the statue was renovated and Baby Jesus was given a Baroque crown.

The rich drapery, articulated in front by three deep bowl-shaped folds and a transverse apron motif, is flanked by cascades of vertical folds at the sides. It thus retains the formal features of the beautiful style, but is cut with greater severity. A certain eclecticism and stylistic exhaustion, manifested in the mechanical multiplication of details, results in a loss of internal tension." The general register of late beautiful style carvers includes the parabolic cut into the mass of the drapery and the subsequent folded tip of the shawl at the base. In painting, this element appears in the Master of the Třeboň Altarpiece (Epitaph of John of Jeřeně, 1395) and in works close to the period, for example, in the Pietà from Všeměřice (c. 1410), the Madonna from the Minorite Monastery in Český Krumlov (c. 1410) or the Madonna from Svéraz (1420).

The overall tone of the work shows an attempt at a certain creative rethinking of the previous period of the reverberation of the beautiful style, which tended towards a schematic relief flatness. The sculptor returns to a more spatially generous dramatic modelling and a fuller volumetric weight, even a "Baroqueisation" of the form. He articulates the mass with deep herringbone incisions and elongated notches, which he combines with monumentally arched smooth volumes. He sculpts the surface with shallow rounded lines. Advanced features, such as the cascade of folds under the left arm which passes to the front, the tip of the mantle pointing towards the free leg and disturbing the static, or the hint of movement of the drapery already foreshadow the late Gothic. The back of the sculpture is covered by a flat slab, undulating with three shallow vertical folds that break sharply at the plinth. This concept also corresponds more to the style of the second quarter of the 15th century.

Compared to the older Plzeň Madonna, which belongs to the top works of the beautiful style, the sculpture lacks subtle sensuality and tends towards a more "burgher" artistic view. The sculptor accentuates verticality and frontal position, to which he adapted the concept of drapery. Mary is holding the child on her left side over a firm foot, and the counterpoint shows the slight step of the right free leg and the accentuated knee. Baby Jesus has a sensitively sculpted naked body and his hair is combed to the side and styled in snail-like spirals. The pressing of the Madonna's long fingers into the child's body has a eucharistic significance. His hair is combed to the sides and styled in snail-like spirals. The Madonna's typical oval face and hair, worked in parallel shallow incisions, is similar to the Enthroned Madonna of the Týn Temple, which is considered a late work by the Master of Týn Calvary.

The child in the stiff diagonal position lacks the playfulness of the Jesuses of the beautiful style period, and the mother pushes them away from her in a gesture of offering (ostentatio). This is matched by her slightly bowed head and her gaze turned heavenwards. Mary here represents the Church (Ecclesia) and the child offered to the faithful is an invitation to their personal participation in the passion of Christ. The apple symbolizes Christ as both the second Adam and the King. The pathetic expression of the period, in which the intimate relationship between mother and child is transformed into an ideological manifestation of the saving role of Christ, responds to the pre-revolutionary situation in Bohemia. The sculpture is a solitaire that cannot be directly linked to any other work of the same age. It is assumed that it was created in a carving workshop in Plzeň, which was influenced by the Prague environment and adopted some details from the circle of the Master of Týn Calvary.

On the basis of formal features and historical reports, the statue can be placed in the period around 1415, or before 1419, since at that time the monastery was sacked by the radical Hussites led by Václav Koranda. Part of the inventory was saved, as evidenced by another surviving Franciscan Madonna from around 1350. The restoration after 1420 was slow and the monastery was again severely damaged by the Hussites during the last siege of Plzeň in 1433-1434. Jiří Fajt also admits the possibility that the statue was created by a carver who fled from Hussite Prague during the restoration of the plundered Franciscan monastery sometime after 1420. Ottová places the origin of the statue to the time of the introduction of the so-called New Feast after the last siege of Plzeň by Hussite troops in 1434. The style of carving has its closest analogues in Nuremberg and the isolation of the statue in the West Bohemian environment may mean that it is the work of a Nuremberg sculptor or import.

=== Related works ===
- Madonna of Plzeň (1384)
- Pietà from Všeměřice (around 1415)
- Enthroned Madonna from the Týn Cathedral in Prague (1420)
- Madonna from Svéraz (around 1420)
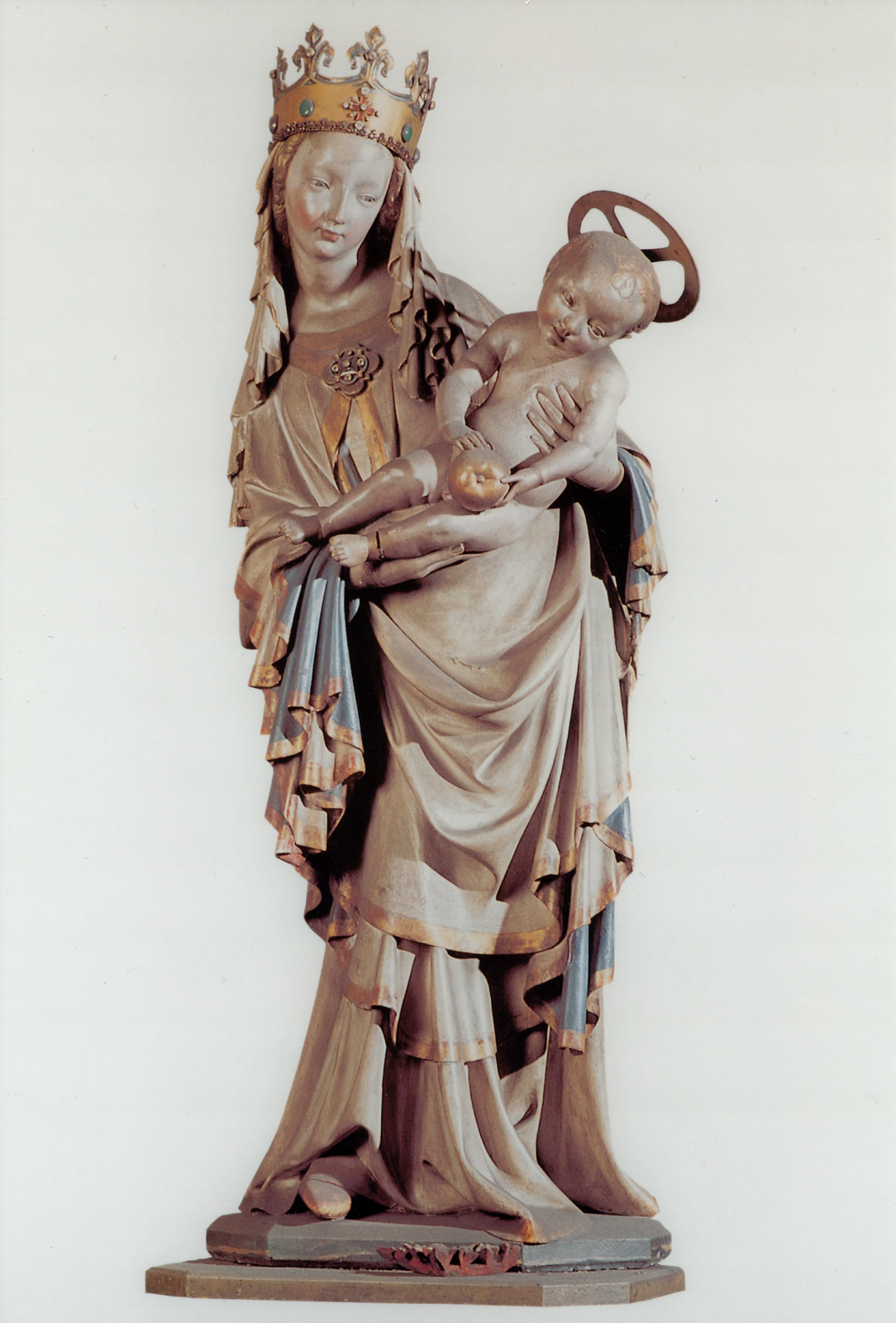
Madonna of Plzeň (1384)

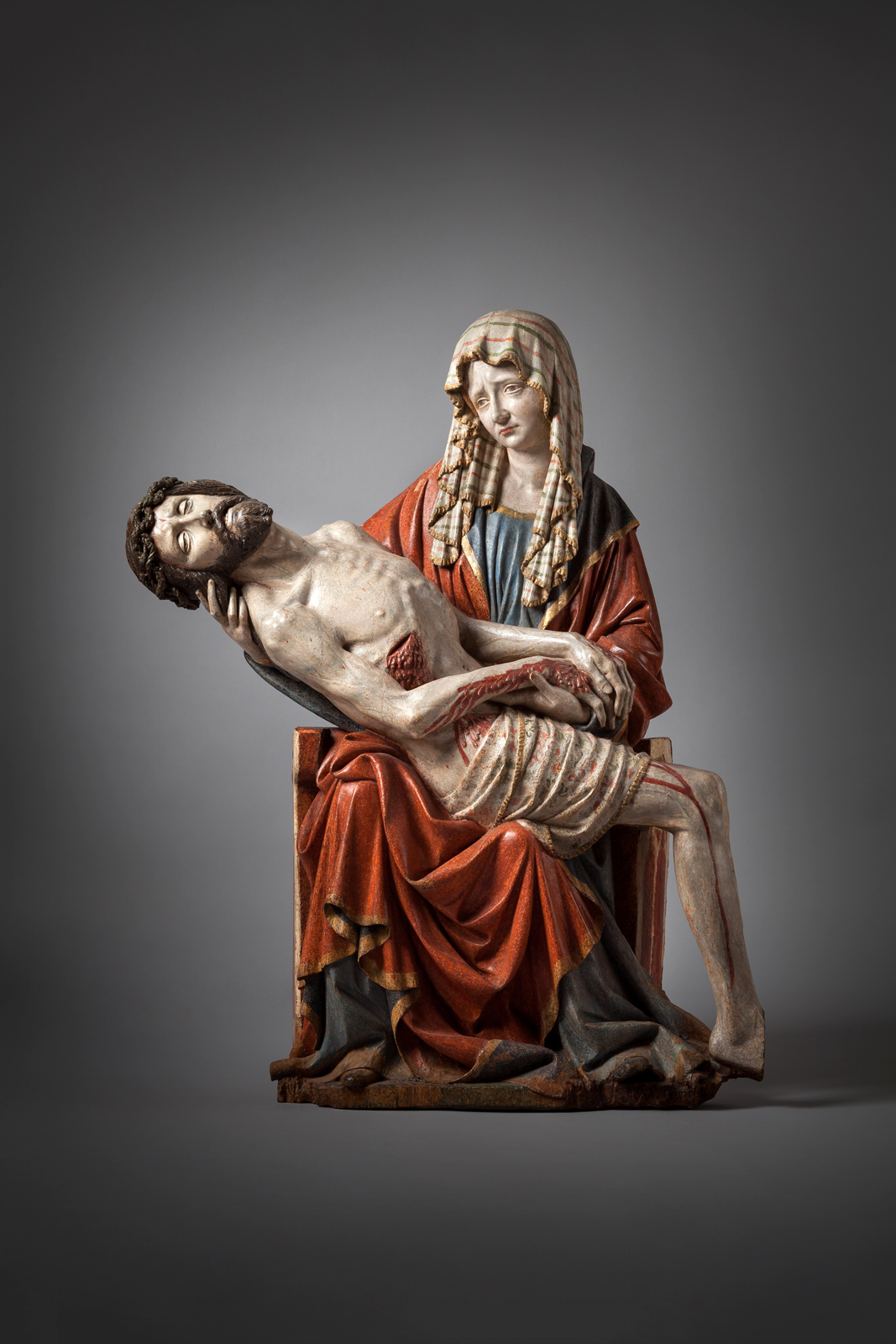
Pietà from Všeměřice (around 1415), Aleš South Bohemian Gallery in Hluboká nad Vltavou

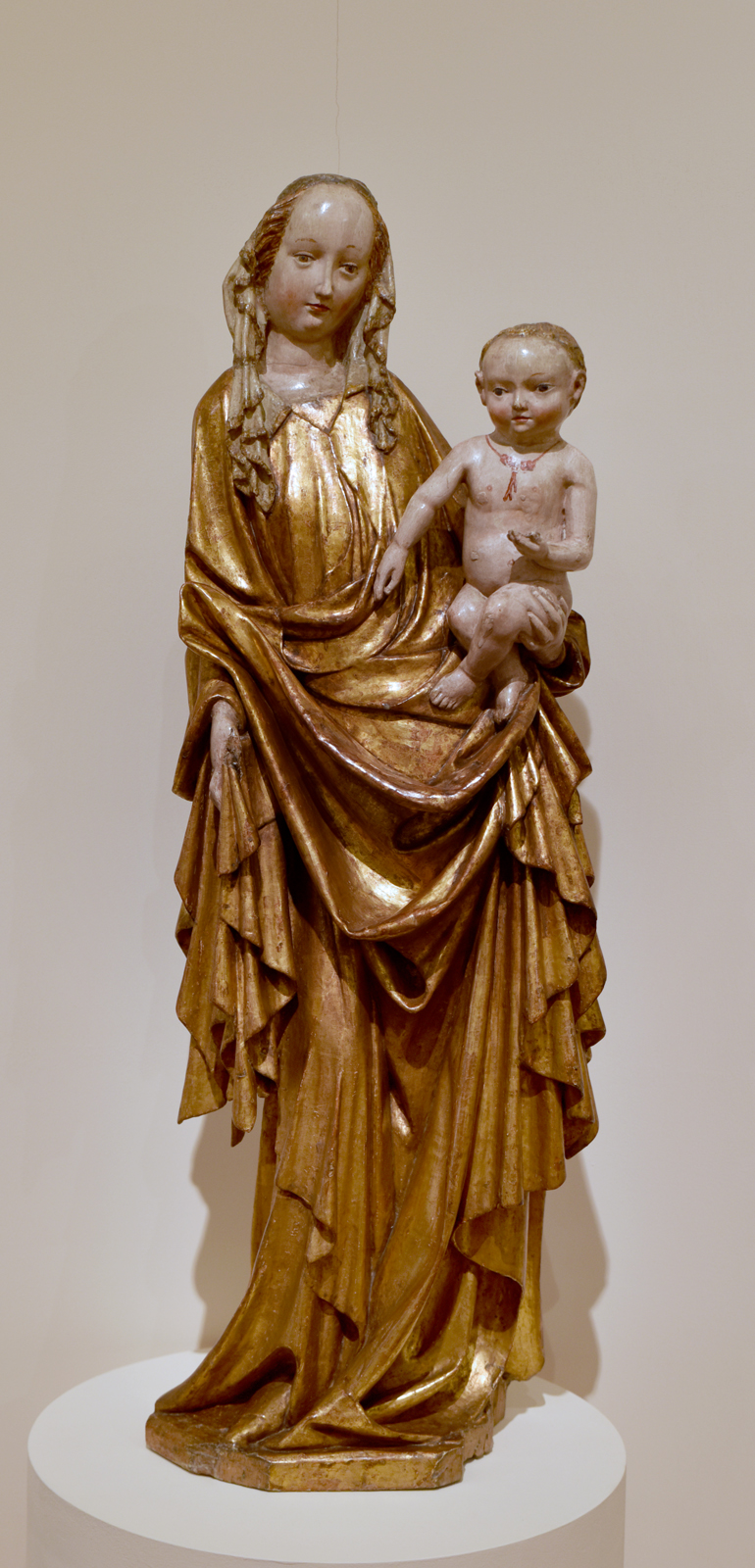
Madonna from Svéráz (around 1420), Aleš South Bohemian Gallery in Hluboká nad Vltavou

== Sources ==
- Petr Jindra, Michaela Ottová (eds.), Above the Sun More Beautiful. Plzeň Madonna and Beautiful Style, exhibition catalogue 96 p., Plzeň 2020, West Bohemian Gallery in Plzeň, ISBN 978-80-88027-41-6, Catholic Theological Faculty of Charles University, ISBN 978-80-87922-27-9
- Fajt Jiří, Chlumská Štěpánka, Bohemia and Central Europe 1200-1550, National Gallery in Prague 2014, ISBN 978-80-7035-569-5
- Jiří Fajt (ed.) Charles IV, Emperor by the Grace of God. Culture and Art during the Reign of the Luxembourgers 1310-1437, Prague 2006
- Homolka Jaromír, Chlíbec Jan, Šteflová Milena, Master of Týn Calvary, catalogue of the National Gallery exhibition, Prague 1990
- Albert Kutal, Gothic Sculpture, in: History of Czech Fine Arts I, Academia, Prague 1984
- Albert Kutal, Sculpture, in: Kavka F (ed.), Czech Gothic Art 1350-1420, Academia, Prague 1970
- Albert Kutal, Czech Gothic Sculpture 1350-1450, SNKLU, Prague, 1962
