= Vyšší Brod Pass =

Coordinates: 48°33′48″N 14°18′59″E

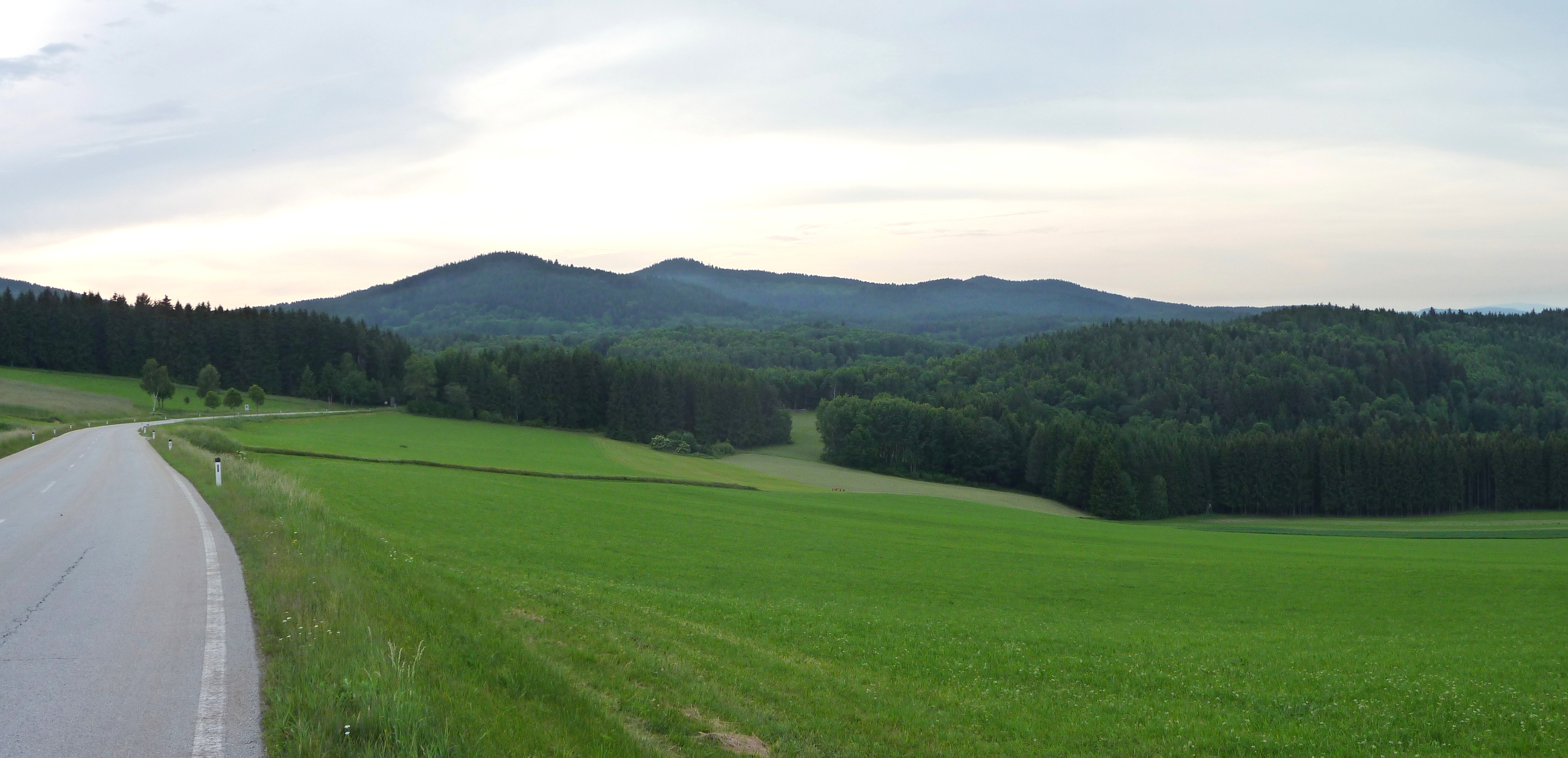
Vyšebrodský Pass as seen from Austria

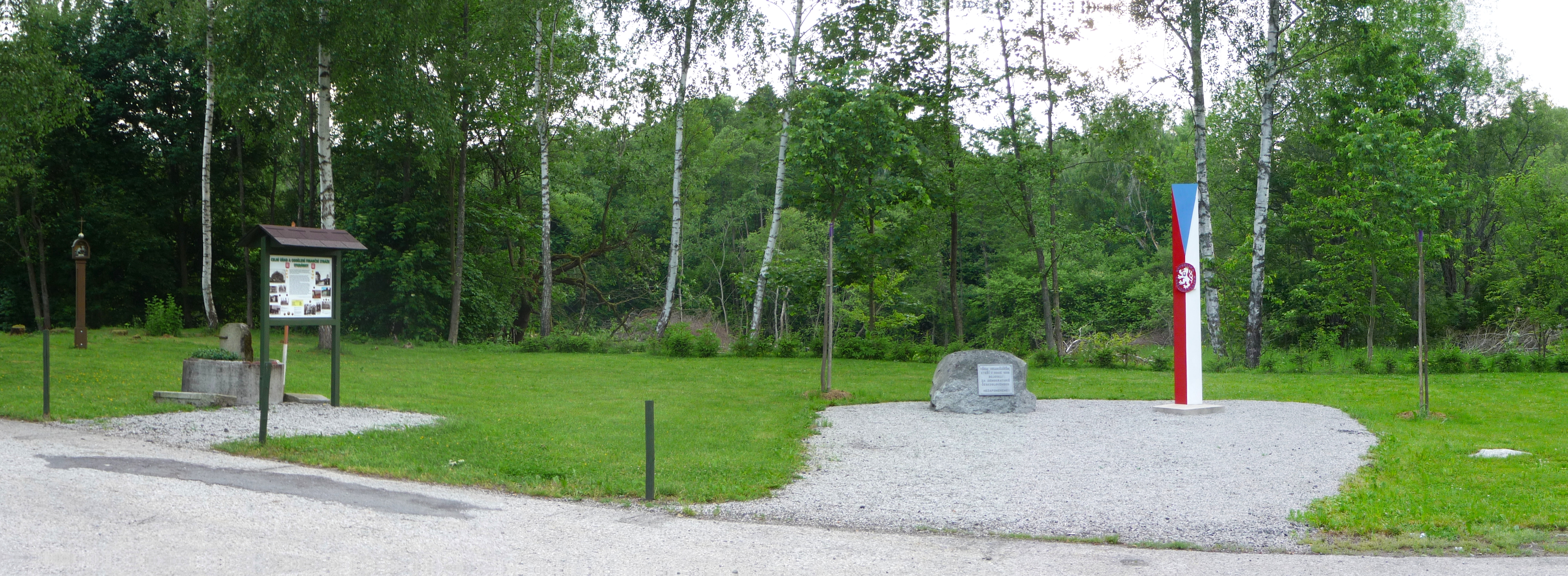
Memorial to Czechoslovak bordermen who fought in the pass with German Freikorps in 1938

The Vyšší Brod Pass (Czech: Vyšebrodský průsmyk, German: Hohenfurther Pass) is a mountain pass separating the Bohemian Forest mountain range and the Granite and Gneiss Plateau.

== Geography ==
The pass is located on the border between the Czech Republic and Austria, between the towns of Vyšší Brod and Bad Leonfelden. It lies at a height of 764 metres (2,507 ft) above sea level and is the southernmost point of the Bohemian Forest. The southernmost point of the Czech Republic is located 1.8 km (1.1 mi) southeast of the pass.

== Transport ==
Since the Roman Empire times a road connecting the Danube with Bohemia went over the pass. The old track was replaced by a motor road in modern times. The road border crossing Studánky / Weigetschlag is located here.
