= Sternstein =

Mountain in Upper Austria, Austria

Coordinates: 48°33′35″N 14°16′3″E

The Sternstein Mountain is situated in the north of Upper Austria, Austria in the districts of Bad Leonfelden and Vorderweißenbach. On its north flank it also reaches into the Czech Republic. As measured by the height above sea level of its summit it is 1125 meters high.

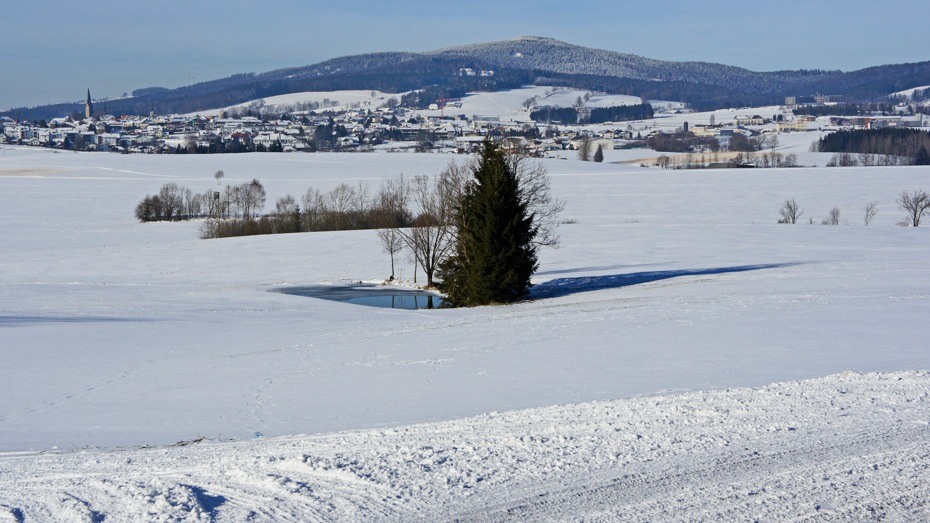

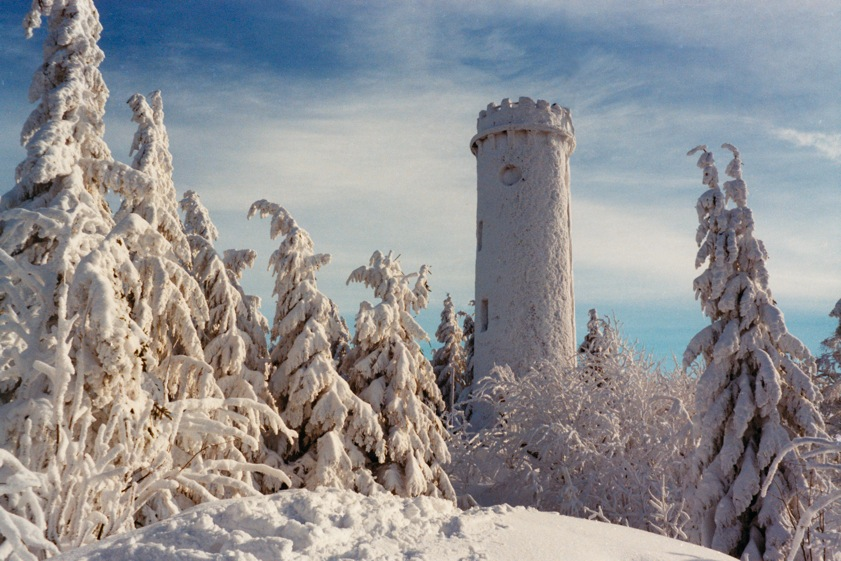

== Geology ==
Geologically it belongs to the Bohemian Massif and is the most eastern part of the Bohemian Forest. As the average temperature in the surroundings of the mountain over the year is less than 6 °C, it is one of the coldest regions of Upper Austria. The municipalities of Vorderweißenbach and Bad Leonfelden get their water supplies from springs arising from lower parts of the mountain.

== Observation Tower ==
In the year 1898 a 20 meter high Observation Tower was built on top of the mountain, in honor to the K.u.K. emperor Franz Joseph I. Today it is still one of the main tourist attractions of the region and can be reached from several hiking paths from all sides of the mountain.

== Sports ==
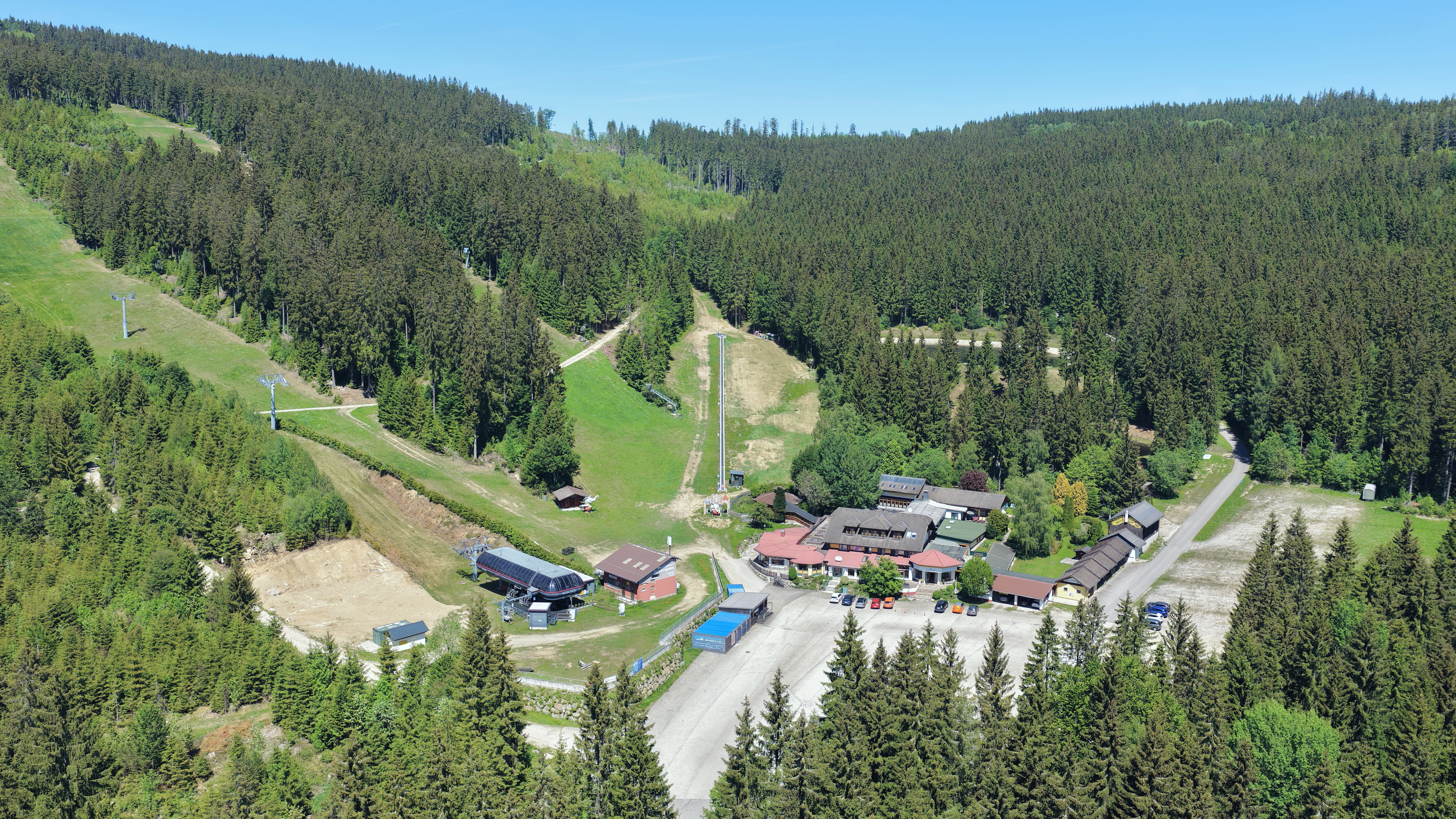
Sternstein ski resort

During the winter the mountain can be used for winter sports. There are four kilometers of slopes on the east flank of the mountain and the Sternstein GmbH operates a combined funicular and chair lift with a capacity of 2850 persons/hour to get to the top of the mountain. Also cross country skiing is very popular in the area of the Sternstein. During the other seasons the mountain is a destination for hikers and mountain bikers. Furthermore, it is situated along a long-distance hiking path, the Nordwaldkammweg.
