= Pietà from Všeměřice =

Gothic Style, Medieval Statue in Czech Republic

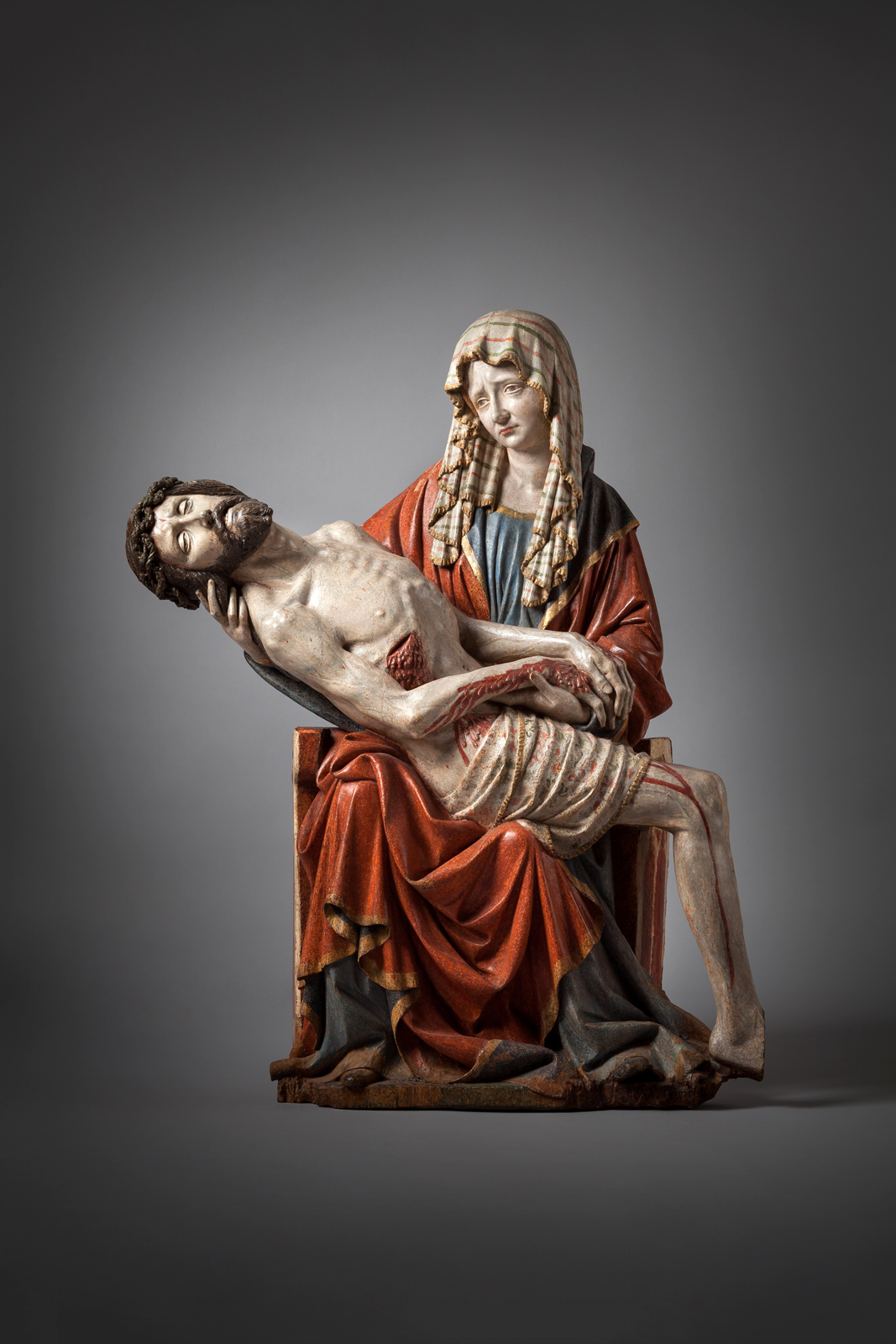
Pietà from Všeměřice, Aleš South Bohemian Gallery in Hluboká nad Vltavou

Pietà from Všeměřice (around 1415) is a medieval statue in the late International Gothic style. The pietà is on display in the Aleš South Bohemian Gallery in Hluboká nad Vltavou, in the Czech Republic.

== History ==
The Pietà was discovered in 1951 in a now defunct village chapel in Všeměřice and acquired for the collections of the District Museum of Local History in Rožmberk. In 1954 it was transferred to the collections of the Aleš South Bohemian Gallery in Hluboká nad Vltavou.

== Description and classification ==
The statue is made of lime wood, excavated at the back, with preserved original polychrome. Height 117 cm. Restored in 1953-54 (L. Slánská), 1956 (B. Slánský and L. Slánská), 2004-2005 (Miroslav Křížek).

The symmetrical diagonal pietà is compositionally based on the Parler tradition, but in its modelling it bears elements of the radical late Beautiful style. Some advanced features place it in the period of increased religious fervor around the Hussite Wars. The Virgin Mary sits on a throne decorated with painted architectural elements. Christ's body and head, which Mary supports with her right hand, are turned forward towards the faithful. Christ's two hands rest on her left palm and forearm. In contrast to the pietàs of the Beautiful Style, which were based on pictorial models, the work is characterized by greater realism and heightened expressiveness. Only the rich modelling of Mary's veil in wavy lines framing her face and Mary's dress, which falls in a cascade of longitudinal and transverse folds and partially suppresses her bodily proportions, remain from the previous period. The incarnation of Christ's pale body, executed with considerable anatomical fidelity, forms a contrast to the deep red of Mary's cloak. The noble head of Christ, which typologically corresponds to works of the Beautiful style, is fringed with beard and long hair and wears a crown of braided ropes.

The mother of Christ, depicted as an elderly woman, has a pained expression on her face and raises Christ's dead body as if to show the faithful his sacrifice. The emphasized verticality is considered an expression of growing gothic tendencies and refers to the Parlerian pietàs. The grandeur of the plastic modelling of Christ's body is exceptional in early 15th century sculpture. The trickles of blood flowing from the wound in the side and on the hand are executed in a sculptural manner like a cluster of beads, and are an expression of the heightened Eucharistic sentiment and the intense cult of the altar sacrament in the period before the outbreak of the Hussite wars.

The Eucharistic significance of Pietà lies in the miracle performed in the rite, in which the mere bread and wine become the body and blood of Christ, which the believer receives in order to attain salvation. The miracle of Christ's sacrifice at the crucifixion is thus repeated in the service. The host is changed into the real body of the Lord and the wine is changed into his blood. The body of Christ on Mary's lap is "analogous to the host elevated by the priest during the service." Mary's lap becomes the altar on which Christ lies as the sacrifice destined to God for the redemption of mankind. The function of the sculpture of the Pietà as an image of grace led, in the spirit of Christian mysticism, to the expansion of the idea of the miraculous power of Christ's wounds.

According to older literature, the Pietà from Všeměřice came from the workshop of the Master of the Týn Calvary, the most important domestic sculptor in the period before the Hussite Wars. The sculpture of Pietà was commissioned before 1410 by the monastery in Vyšší Brod. The Pietà in the monastery church in Vyšší Brod is mentioned in 1411 by Zbyněk Zajíc of Hazmburk, thus specifying the date of the work.

Albert Kutal originally placed the work in the period after the Hussite Wars. According to him, the purpose of the work was no longer the splendour of the form of the Pietàs or the drastic and naturalistic style, but sober factuality and truthfulness: "The art of the time after the Hussite Wars is sombre and joyless. The beautiful, self-contained form and playful line, combined with the tenderness of childlike expression, gave way to a deeply serious mood..." Later he reconsidered the position and attributed the work to the Master of the Týn Calvary and related it to the Calvary of the Chapel of Dumlos (1400).

Some recent works try to prove that the Master of the Týn Calvary was active in Prague after the Hussite Wars and that the Pietà from Všeměřice is a late work of his from around 1430 and was delivered after the sack of the monastery by the Hussites (1422) or comes from the workshop of Hans Multscher and was intended for the convent of the Poor Clares in Český Krumlov. The 2016 catalogue of the Aleš South Bohemian Gallery in Hluboká nad Vltavou collection also states the origin at the Bavarian sculpture workshop and dates the work between 1430 and 1440. This argumentation is convincingly refuted by Ottová and elaborated in her work by Bartuňková.

=== Related works ===
- Pietà in the Church of the Holy Spirit in Prague's Old Town, 1410-1420
- Pietà from the Church of St. Thomas, Brno, stone, c. 1385
- Pietà from Křivák collection, 1390-1400
- Pietà from Marburg, 1380-1390

== Sources ==
- Registration sheet, inv. no. 278, Aleš South Bohemian Gallery in Hluboká nad Vltavou
- Kateřina Bartuňková, Master of Týn Calvary, Bachelor thesis, Faculty of Arts, UDU Prague 2017
- Hynek Látal, Petra Lexová, Martin Vaněk, Meziprůzkumy, AJG Collection 1300–2016, No. 12, AJG Hluboká nad Vltavou 2016, ISBN 978-80-87799-52-9
- Martina Soušková, Pieta z Všeměřic a Oplakávání z Korkusovy Hutě - analysis of the works and transformation of iconography, Bachelor thesis, Faculty of Arts and UDU, University of South Bohemia in České Budějovice 2013
- Jan Mikeš, Pietà from Všeměřice and Pietà from Český Krumlov, On the commissioning policy on the Rozmberk estates in the first half of the 15th century, in: Proceedings of the Faculty of Philosophy, University of Brno, Brno 2009.
- Milena Bartlová, Master of Týn Calvary, Czech sculptor of the Hussite period, Prague 2004
- Homolka Jaromír, Chlíbec Jan, Šteflová Milena: Master of Týn Calvary, catalogue of the NG exhibition, Prague 1990
- Ivo Hlobil, Master of Týn Calvary, Prague Carving Workshop of the Pre-Hussite Period, Prague 1990.
- Hynek Rulíšek, Gothic Art of South Bohemia, Guide, vol. 3, Alšova jihočeská galerie v Hluboká nad Vltavou 1989, ISBN 80-900057-6-4
- Hynek Rulíšek, Gothic Art in South Bohemia, National Gallery in Prague 1989, ISBN 80-7035-013-X
- Albert Kutal, Gothic Sculpture, in: History of Czech Fine Arts I/1, Prague 1984
- Albert Kutal, On the problem of horizontal Pietàs, Umění XI, 1963, p. 349
- Albert Kutal, Czech Gothic Sculpture 1350–1450, SNKLU Prague 1962
- Albert Kutal, On South Bohemian Sculpture of the Pre-Hussite and Hussite Period, in: Proceedings of the Philosophical Faculty of Brno University, Brno 1953, p. 163.
- Albert Kutal, Gothic Sculpture in Bohemia and Moravia, Prague 1940
