= Leopold Wackarž =

The Reverend Lord Leopold Wackarž OCist
- Abbas Generalis Cisterciensis
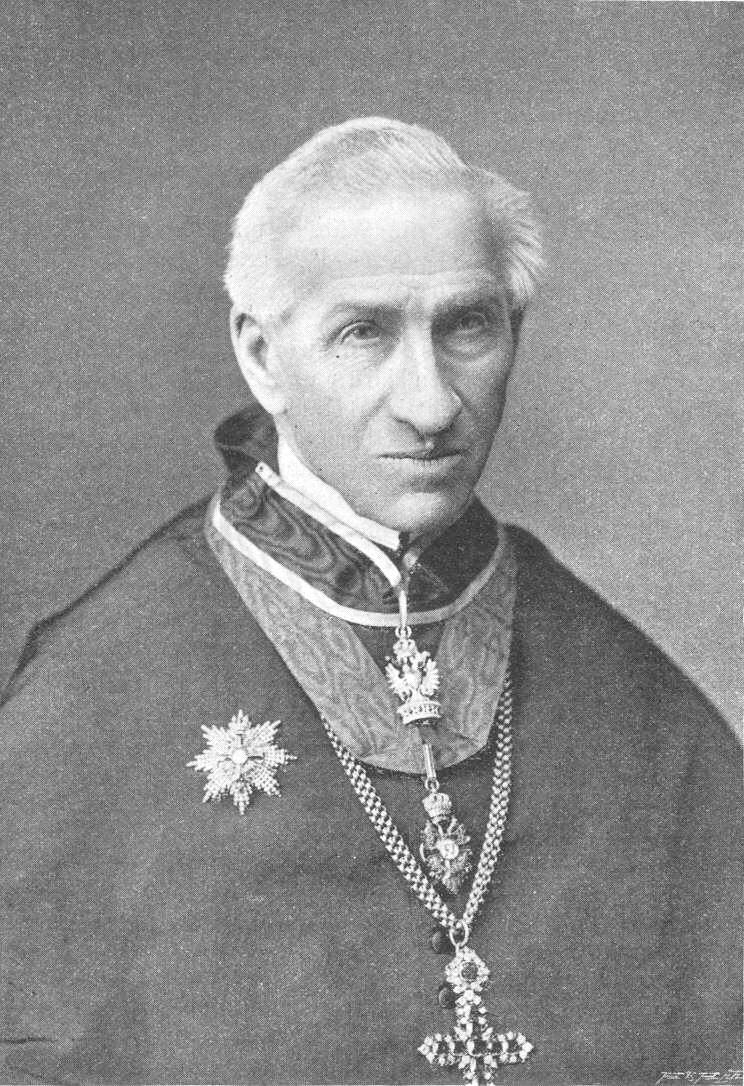
- Leopold Wackarž
- Church: Roman Catholic
- Predecessor: Gregorio Bartolini
- Successor: Amadeus de Bie
- Other posts: Abbot of Vyšší Brod and Vicar General of the Austro-Hungarian Cistercian Congregation

Orders
- Ordination: 1857

Personal details
- Born: Anton Wackarž; 3 May 1810 Horní Planá
- Died: 13 December 1901 (aged 91) Vyšší Brod

Leopold Anton Wackarž, O.Cist (1810–1901) was an Austrian Catholic prelate who served as the 40th abbot of Vyšší Brod Monastery (1857–1901) and the 37th abbot general of the Cistercian Order (1891–1900).
