= Amadeus de Bie =

The Reverend Lord Amadeus de Bie OCist
- Abbas Generalis Cisterciensis
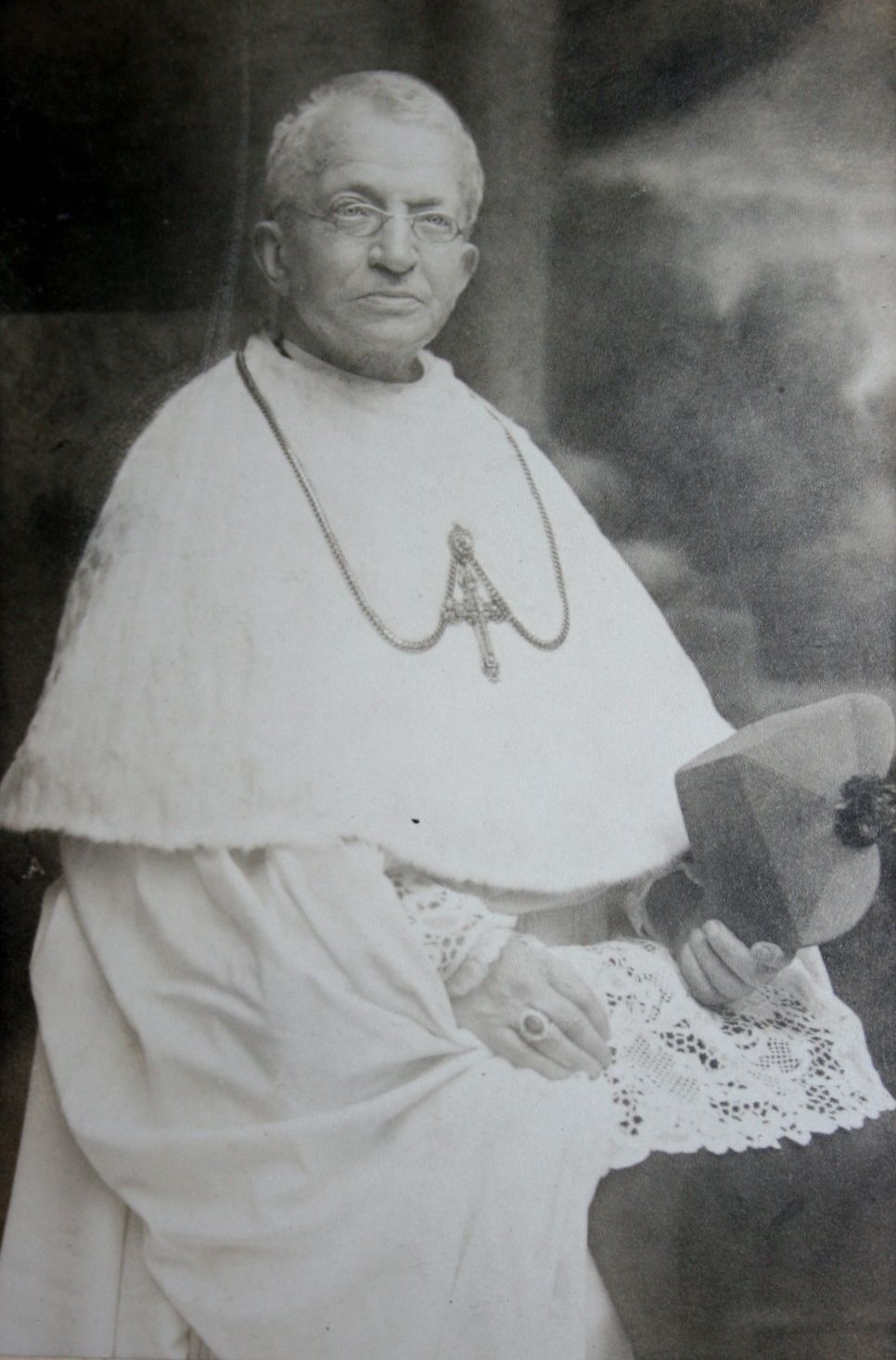
- de Bie in Cappa Magna
- Church: Roman Catholic
- Predecessor: Leopold Wackarž
- Successor: Cassian Haid
- Other post: 2nd Abbot of Bornem Abbey

Orders
- Ordination: 1895 by Cardinal Goossens

Personal details
- Born: Gerardus Franciscus; 16 March 1844
- Died: 25 June 1920 (aged 76)
- Coat of arms

Gerardus Franciscus Amadeus de Bie, O.Cist (16 March 1844 - 25 June 1920) was a Dutch Catholic prelate who served as abbot of Bornem Abbey. He later served as the 74th abbot general of the Cistercian Order.

== Ministry ==
In 1862 he entered Bornem Abbey, and chose his monastic name in honour of Amadeus of Lausanne. In 1895, after the death of Abbot Robertus van Ommeren, de Bie was elected abbot and consecrated by Cardinal Pierre-Lambert Goossens. De Bie served as Abbot of Bornem until 1900, when he was elected abbot general of the Cistercians, succeeding Leopold Wackarž. De Bie's new appointment required that he move to Rome, where he lived in a rented apartment. He was succeeded as Abbot of Bornem by Thomas Schoen. De Bie served as abbot general throughout the First World War. He died in Rome in 1920.
