= Prague Postal Museum =

Coordinates: 50°5′32.06″N 14°25′43.07″E

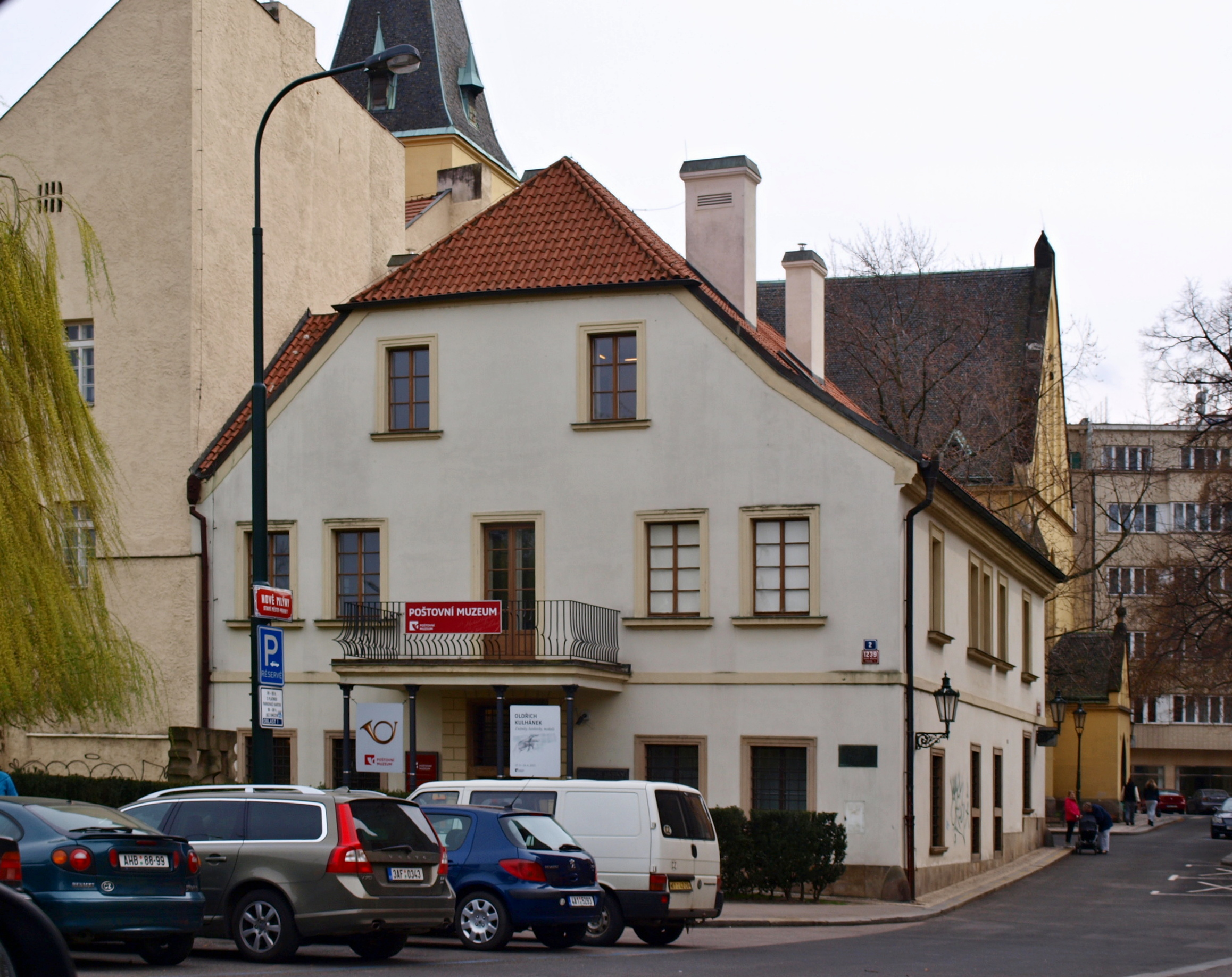
Prague Postal Museum

The Prague Postal Museum (Czech: Poštovní muzeum Praha), Prague, Czech Republic, was established in 1918 by the Czechoslovak Ministry of the Post and Telegraph. The ministry was in charge of the museum until the end of 1992. With the fall of Communism in Czechoslovakia and the subsequent peaceful dissolution of the state the collections of the museum were split into Czech and Slovak parts. The Czech museum belongs to the state-owned company Czech Post. Since 1988 it is housed in the restored building of Vávra's Mill, a Cultural monument of Czech Republic, id number 40042/1-1189.

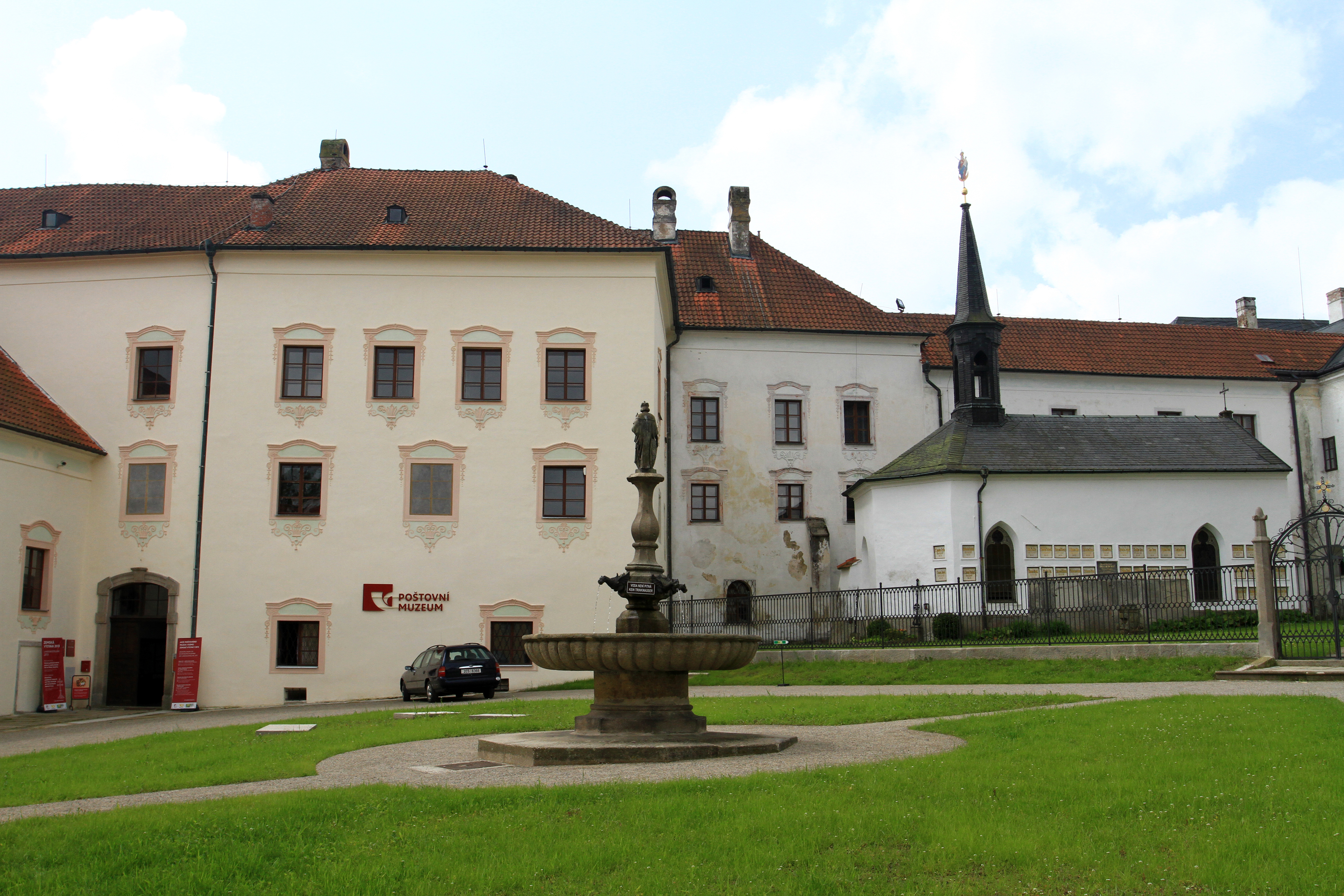
The Vyšší Brod branch

There is a branch of the museum in Vyšší Brod, in the 13th century Cistercian Vyšší Brod Monastery.

== Gallery ==
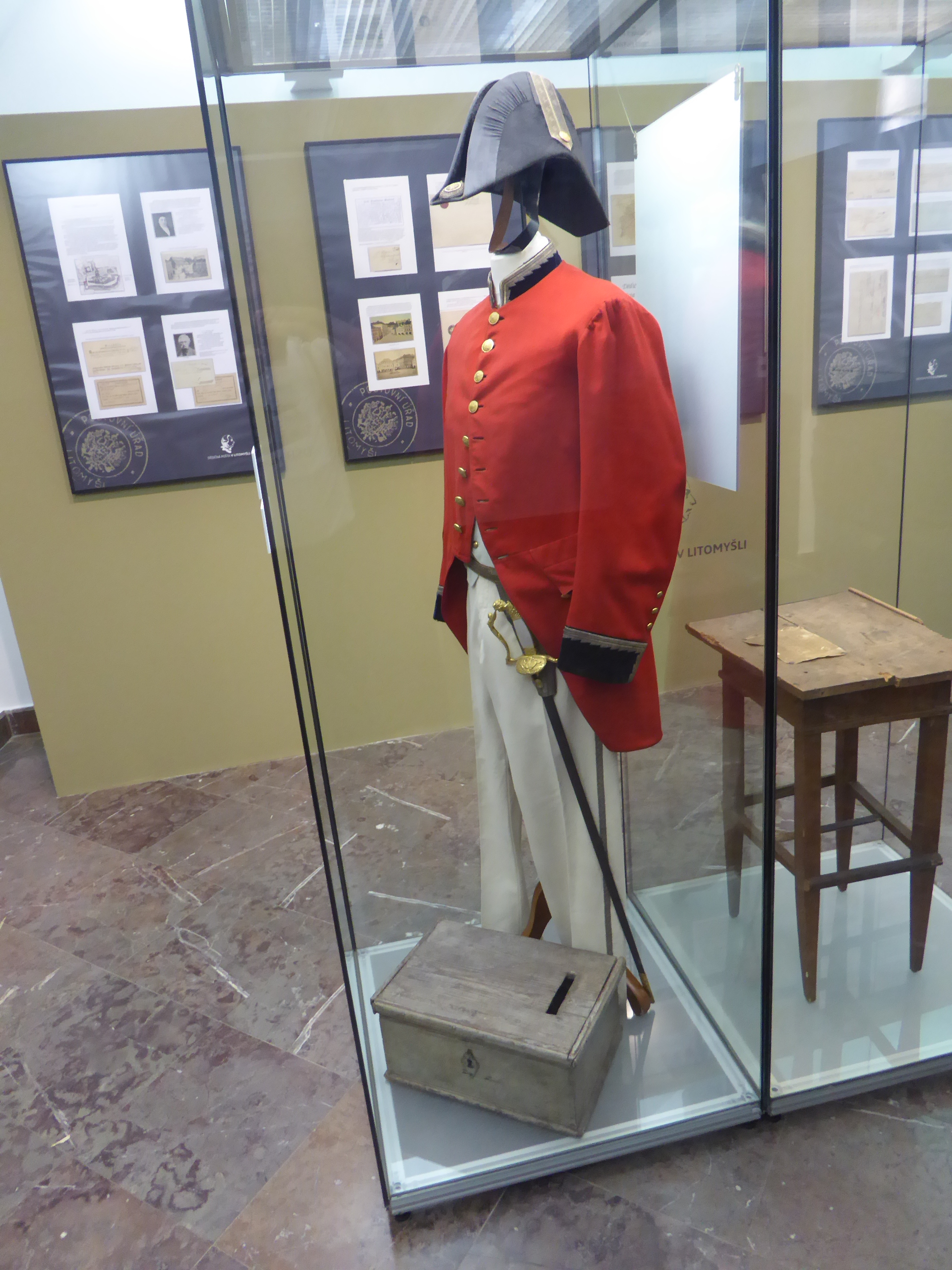

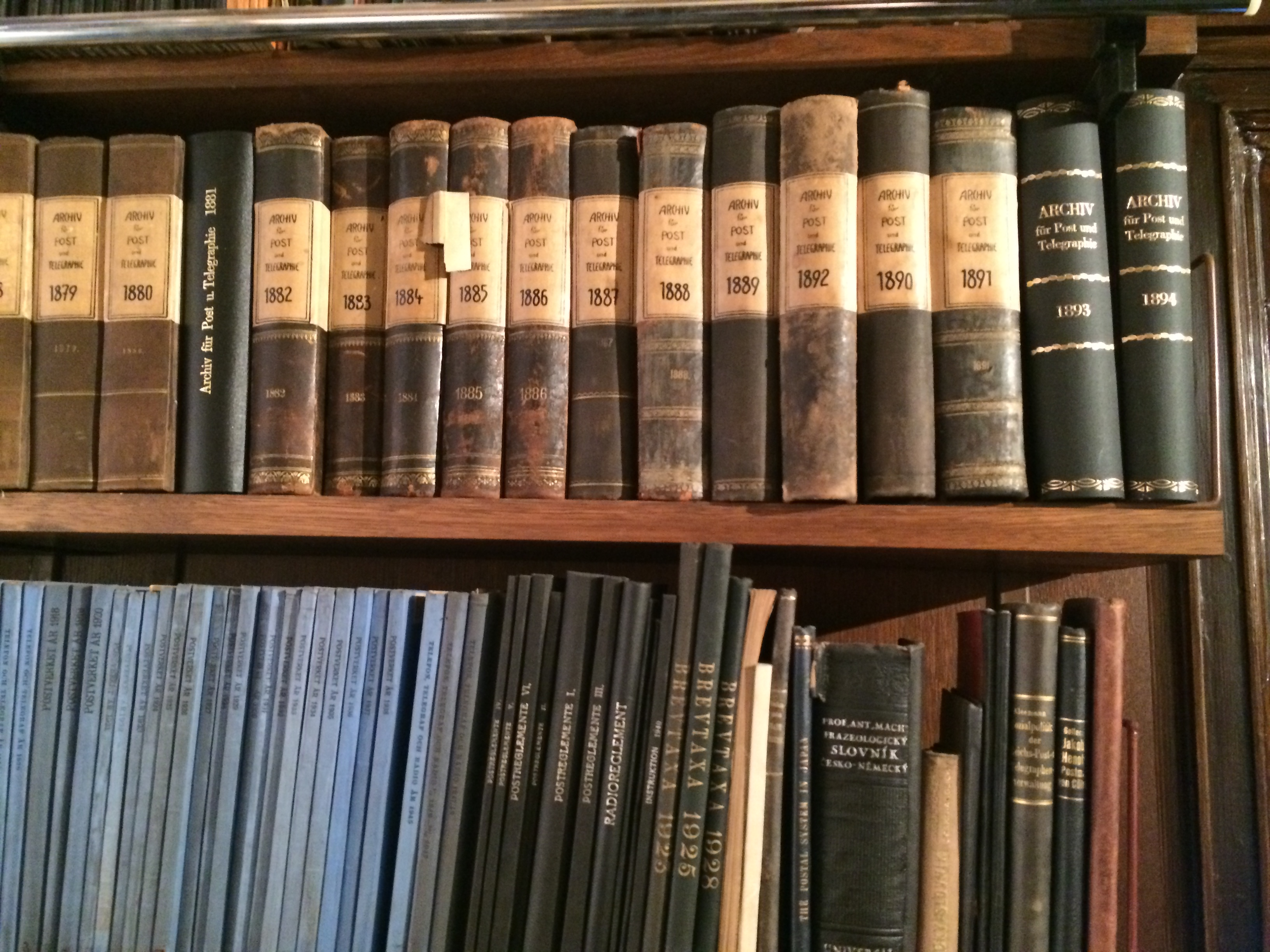

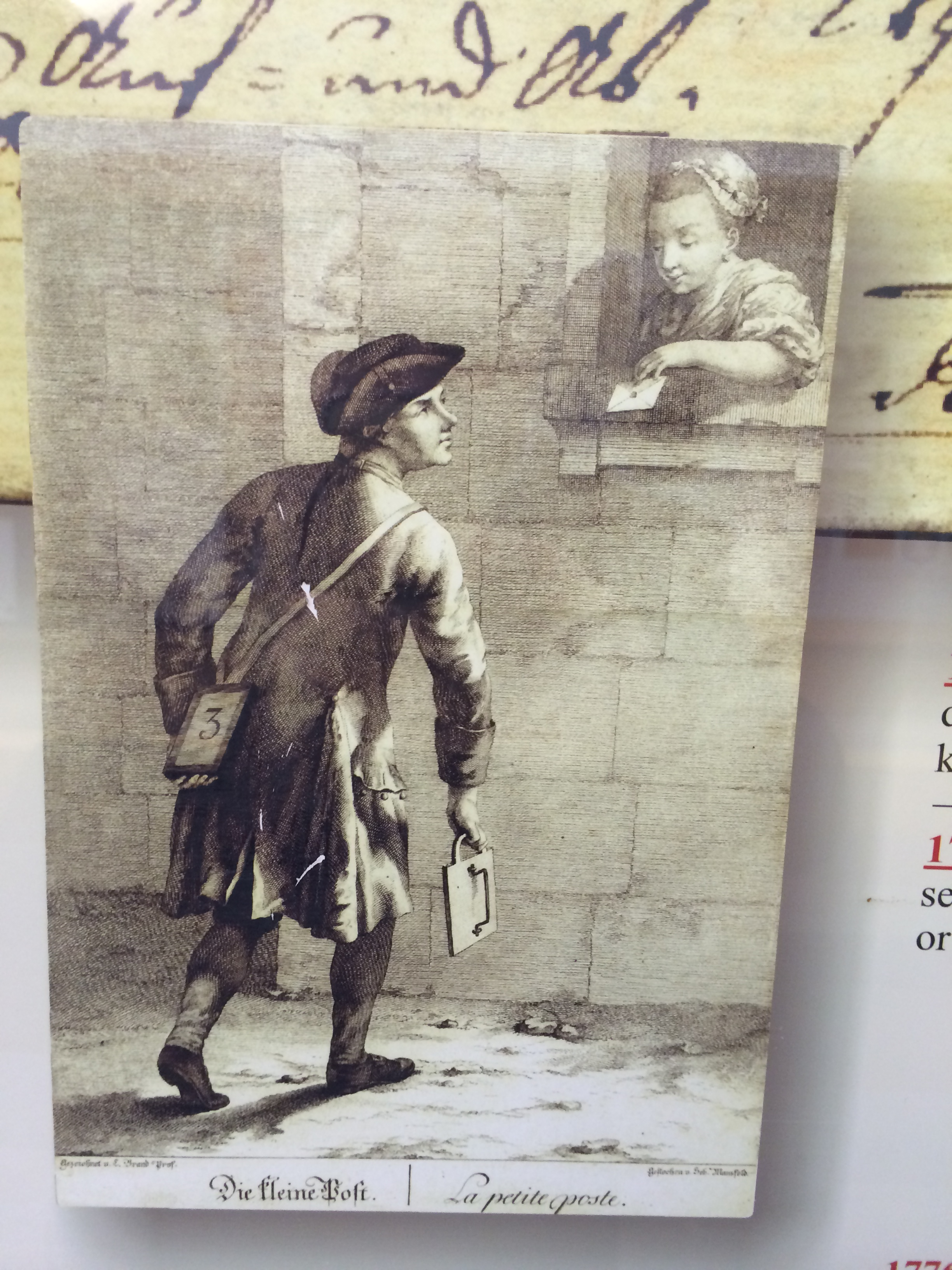

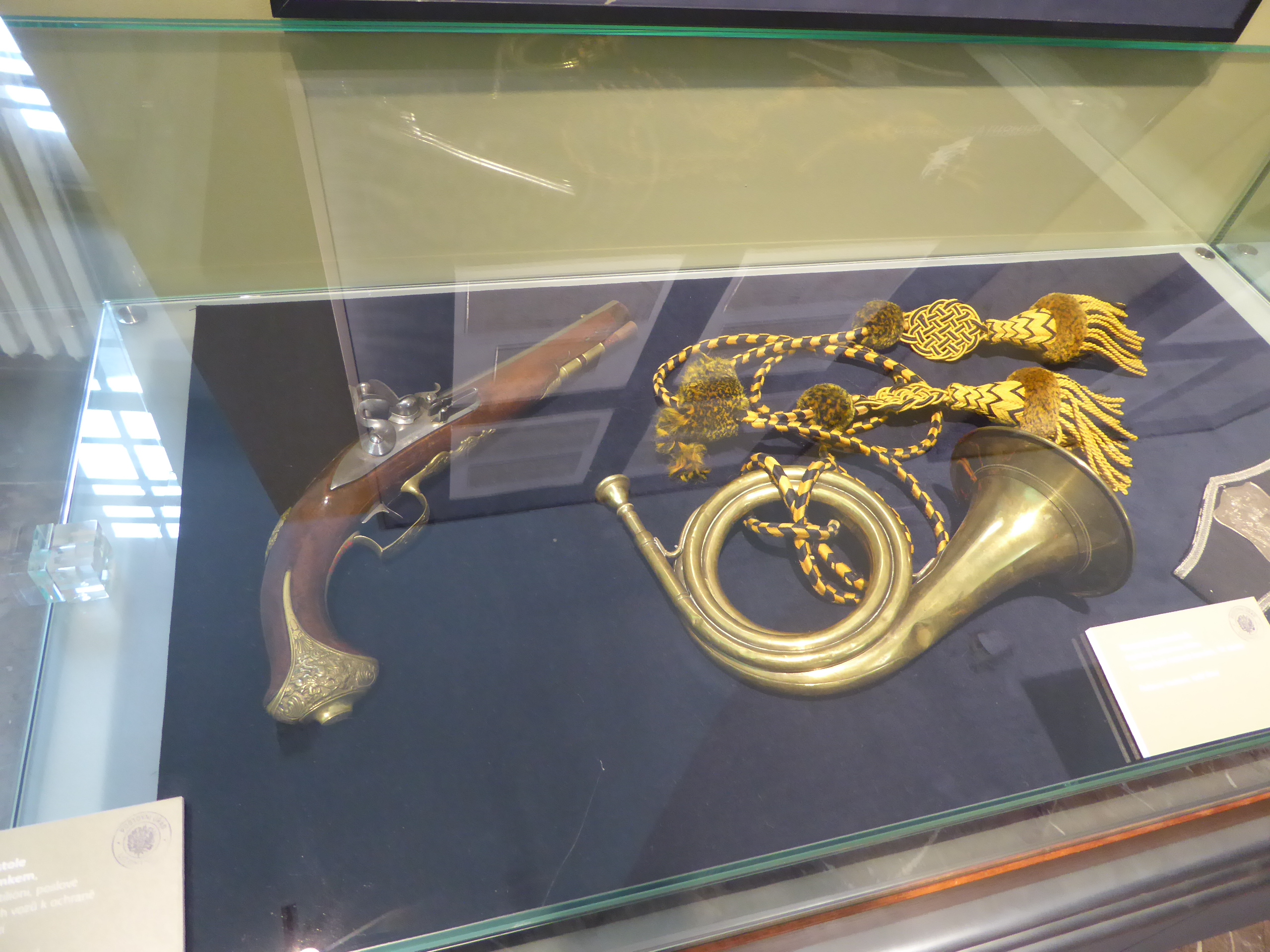
