= Vyšší Brod Monastery =

- Vyšebrodský klášter
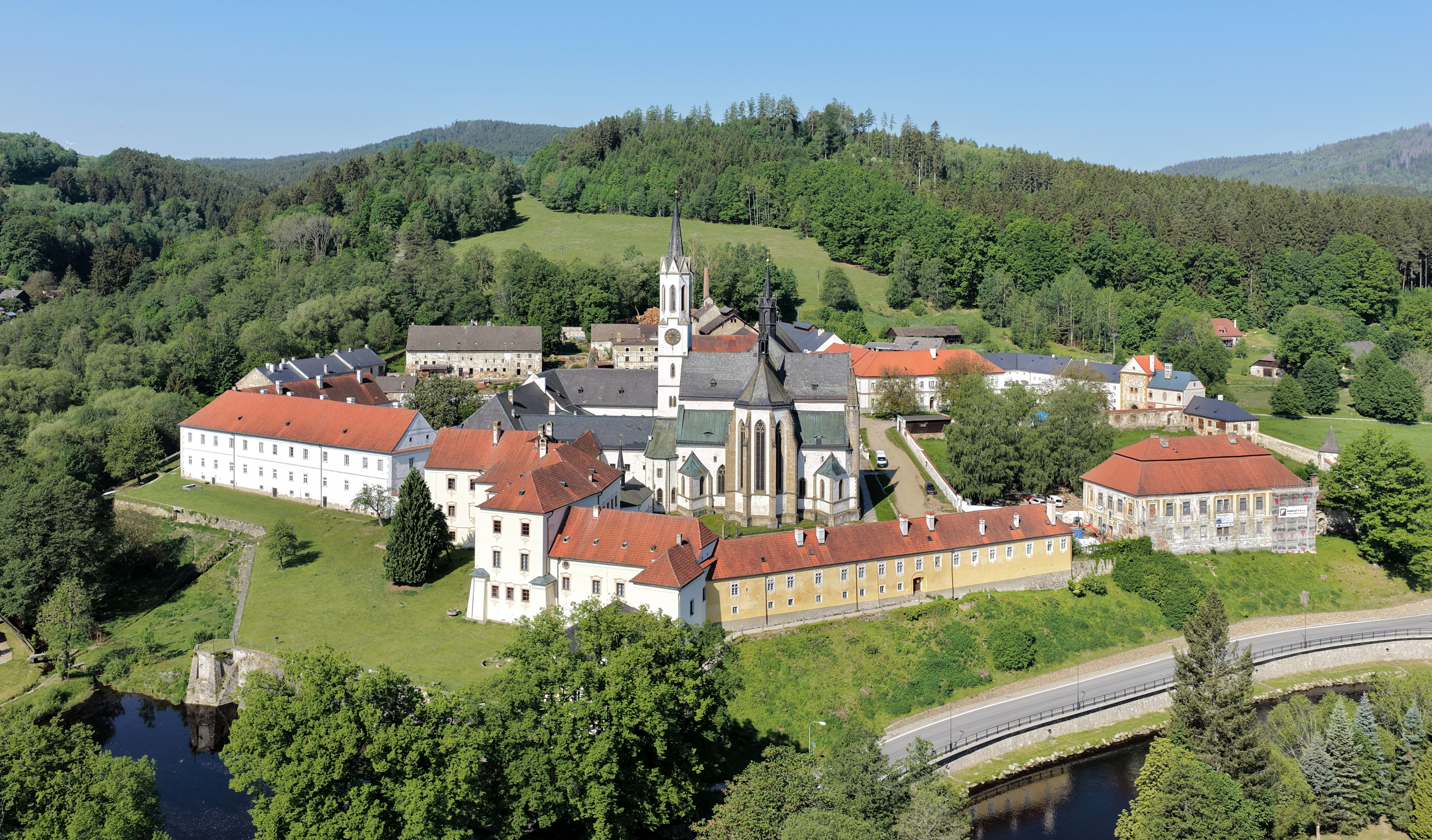
- East view of Vyšší Brod monastery

- Location within Czech Republic

Monastery information
- Order: Cistercians
- Established: 1259; 1945 (reestabilished); 1990 (reestabilished)
- Disestablished: 17 April 1941; 4 May 1950

Architecture
- Heritage designation: Cultural monument
- Style: Gothic

Site
- Location: Vyšší Brod, South Bohemian Region, Czech Republic
- Coordinates: 48°37′14″N 14°18′24″E
- Website: http://www.klastervyssibrod.cz

Vyšší Brod Monastery (IPA: [ˈvɪʃiː ˈbrot]; Czech: Vyšebrodský klášter) or Hohenfurth Abbey (German: Abtei Hohenfurth) is a Catholic monastery in the Czech Republic.

== Description ==
As one of the most important historical landmarks of South Bohemia, the monastery is recognized as a cultural monument by the Ministry of Culture.

The Cistercian monastery is located on the right bank of the river Vltava, in the south-west part of the town of Vyšší Brod. It was founded in 1259. Leopold Wackarž was formerly the abbot.

The Mass is celebrated exclusively according to the 1962 edition of the Roman Missal (Traditional Latin Mass) with Cistercian propers.

It also houses a branch of the Prague Postal Museum.

== Gallery ==
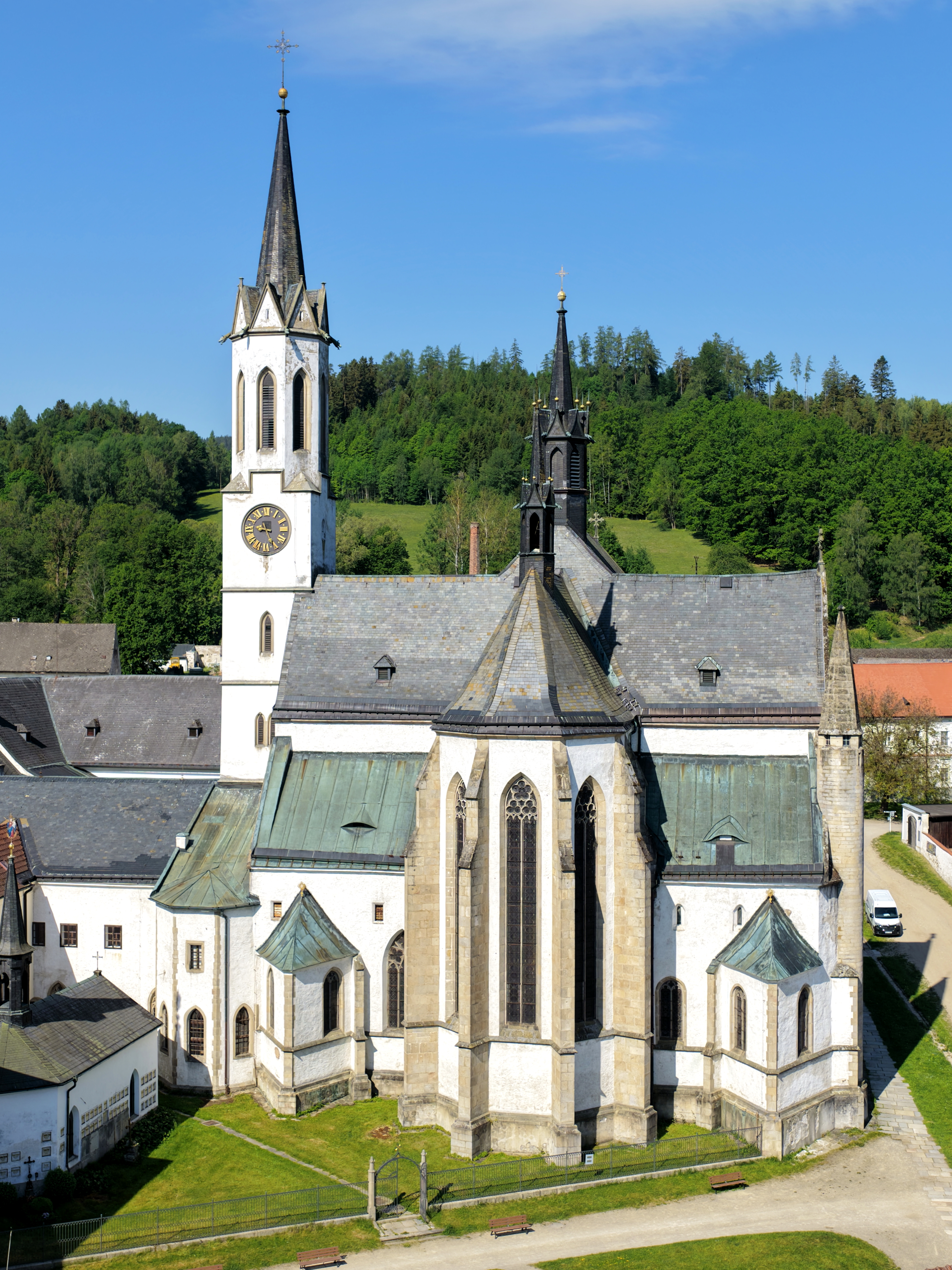
Church of the Assumption of the Virgin Mary

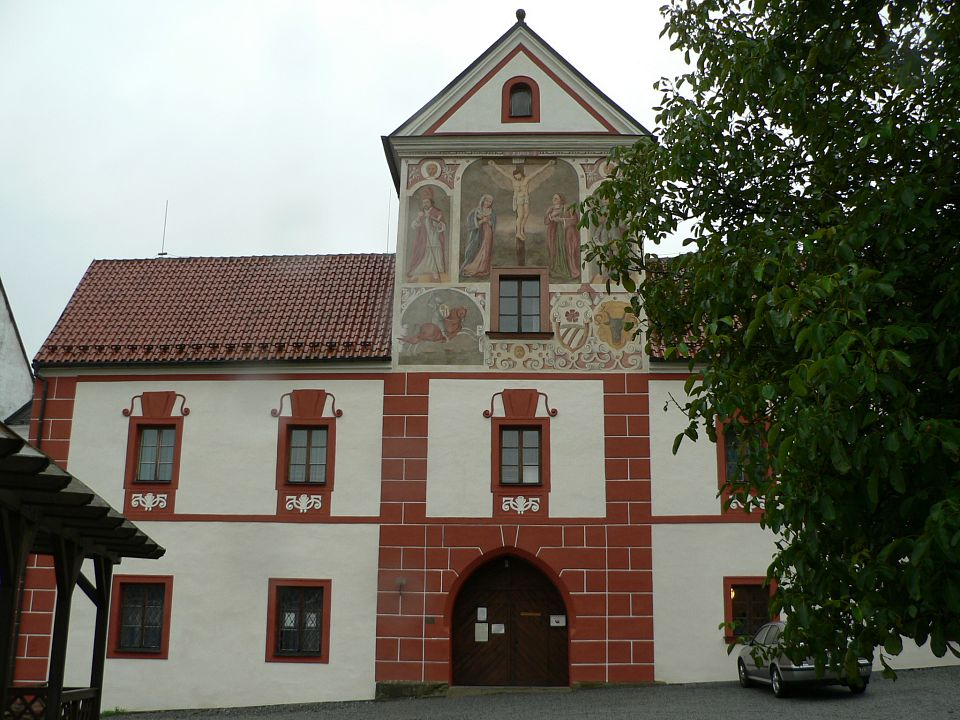
Gate house

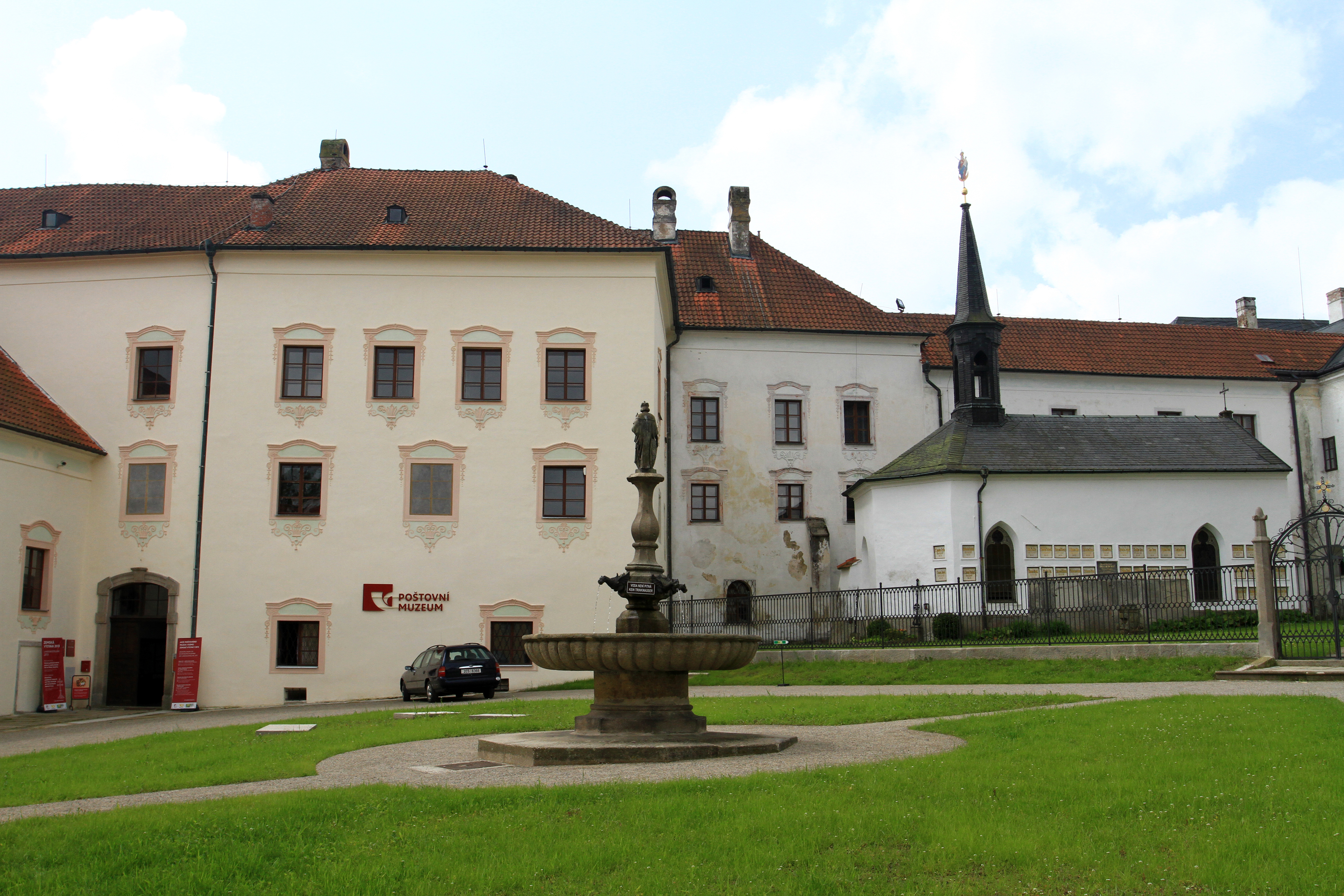
Prague Postal Museum branch

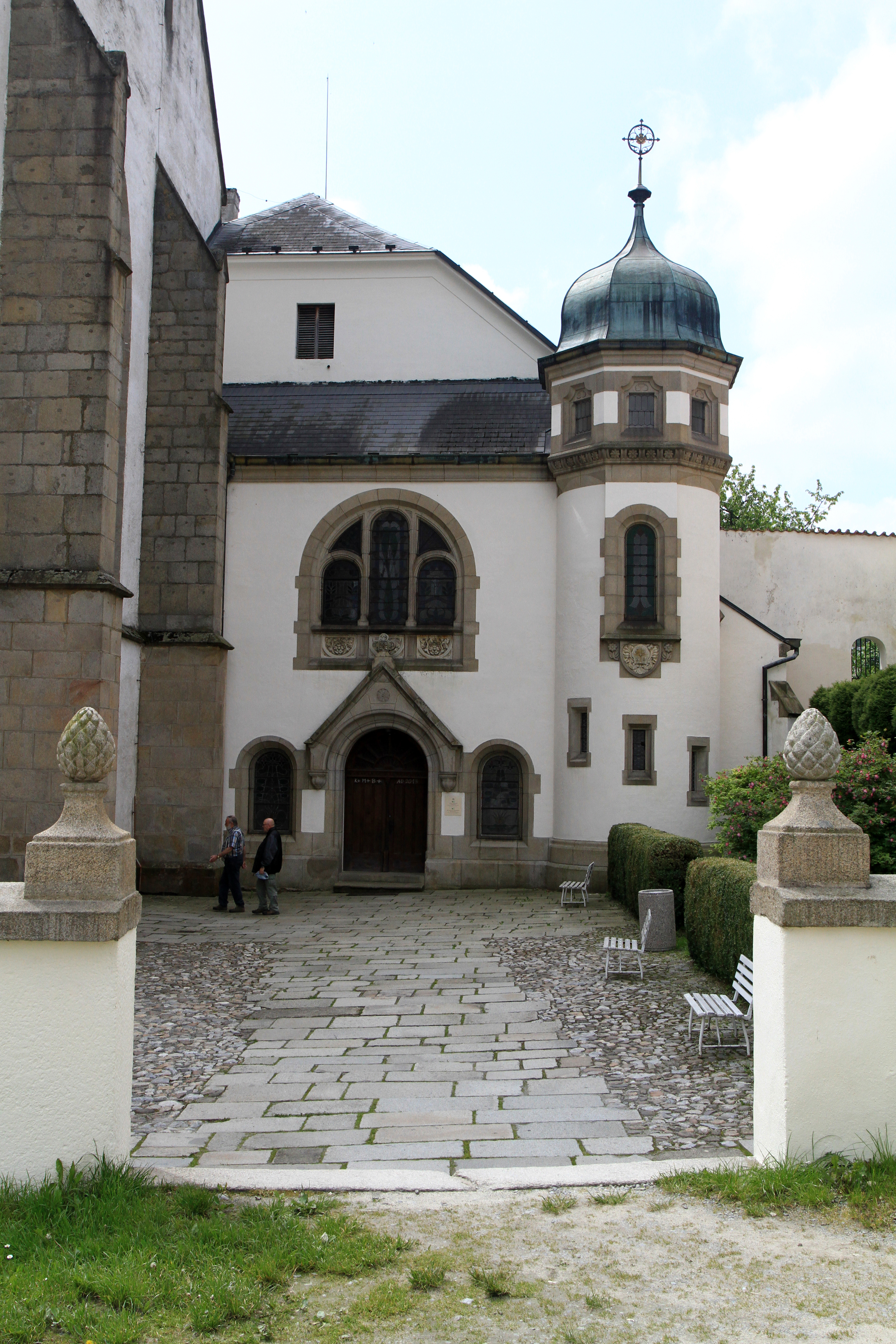

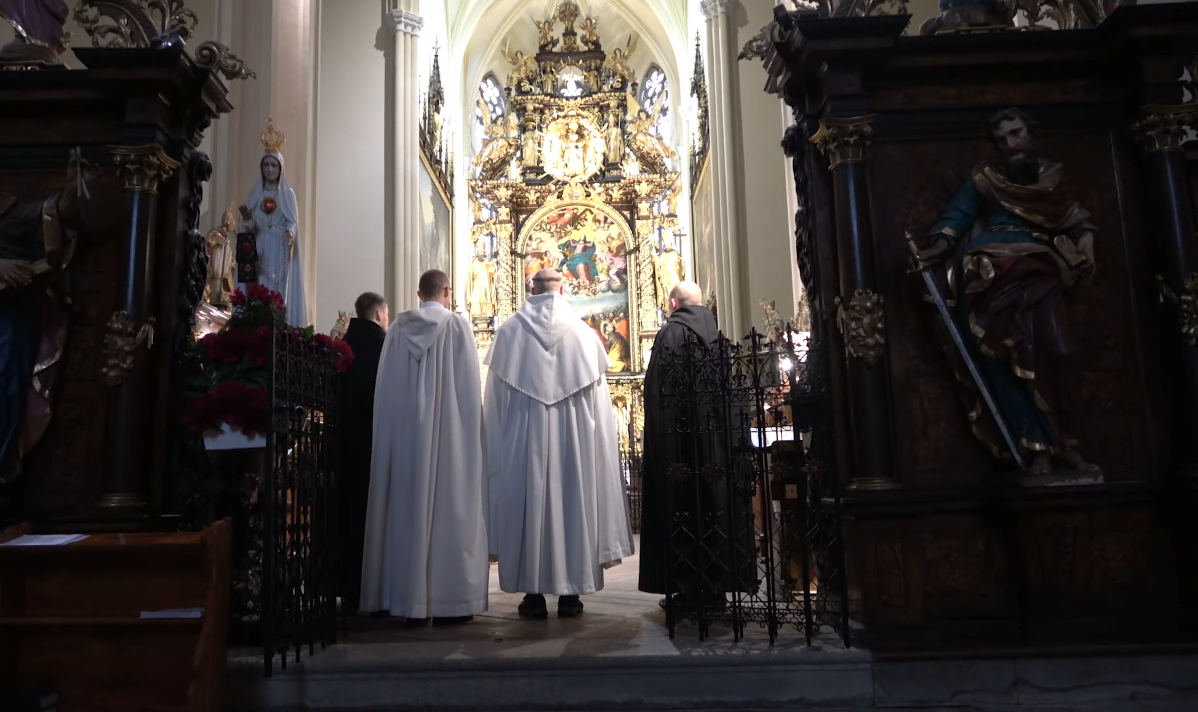
Monks in the church

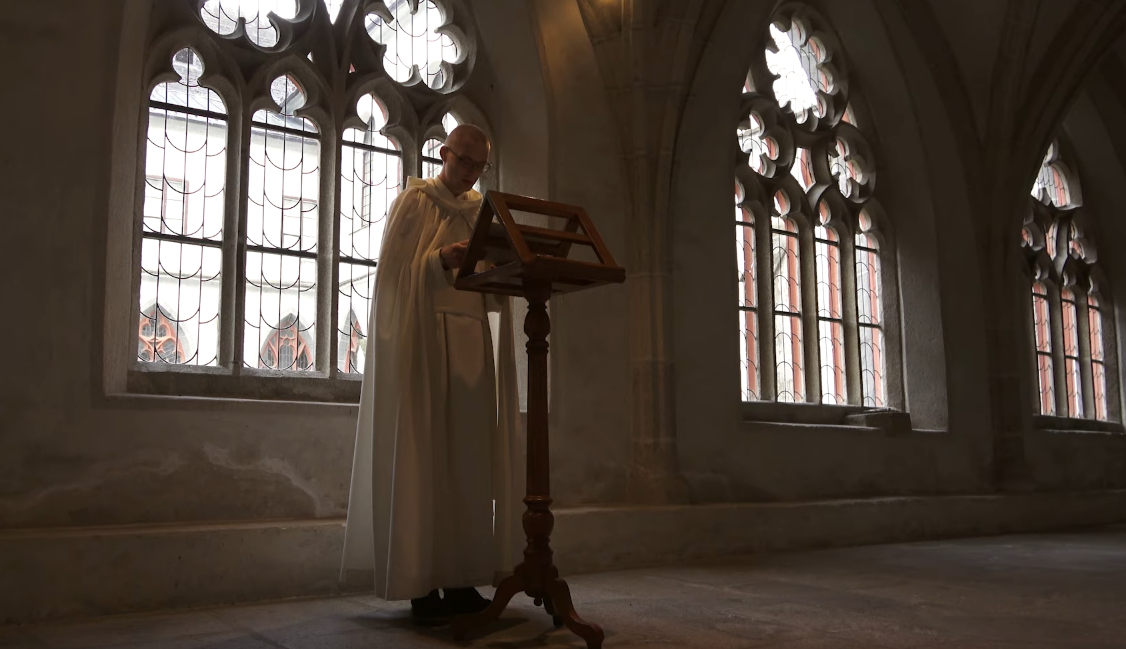
Cistercian at the lectern

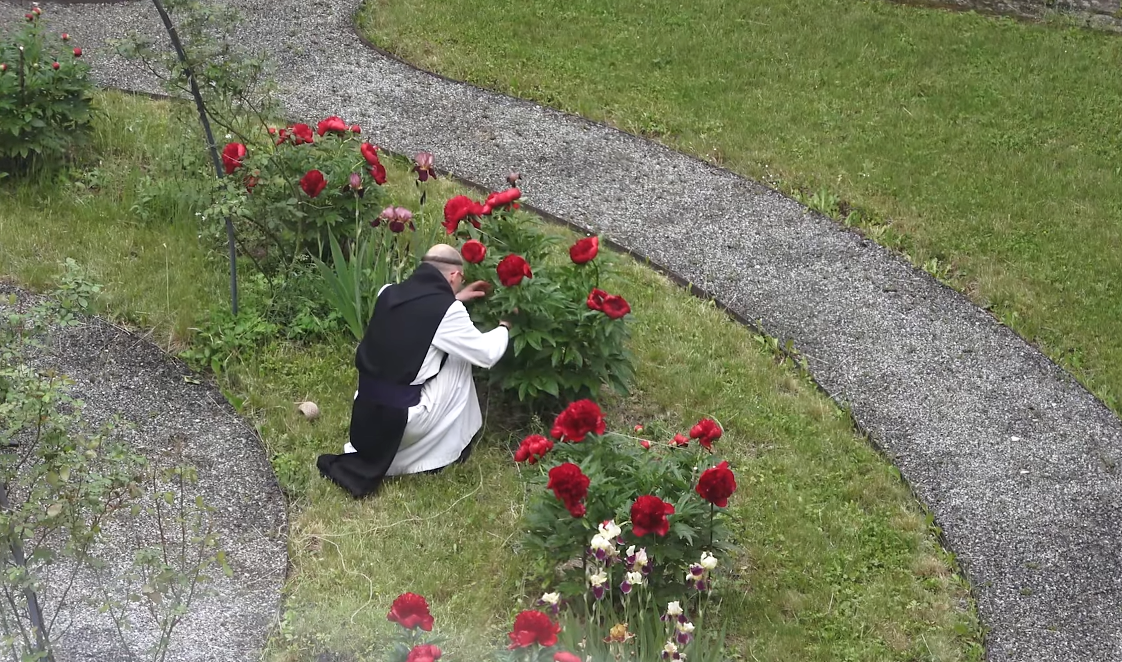
At work in the garden
