= Vorderweißenbach =

- Municipality
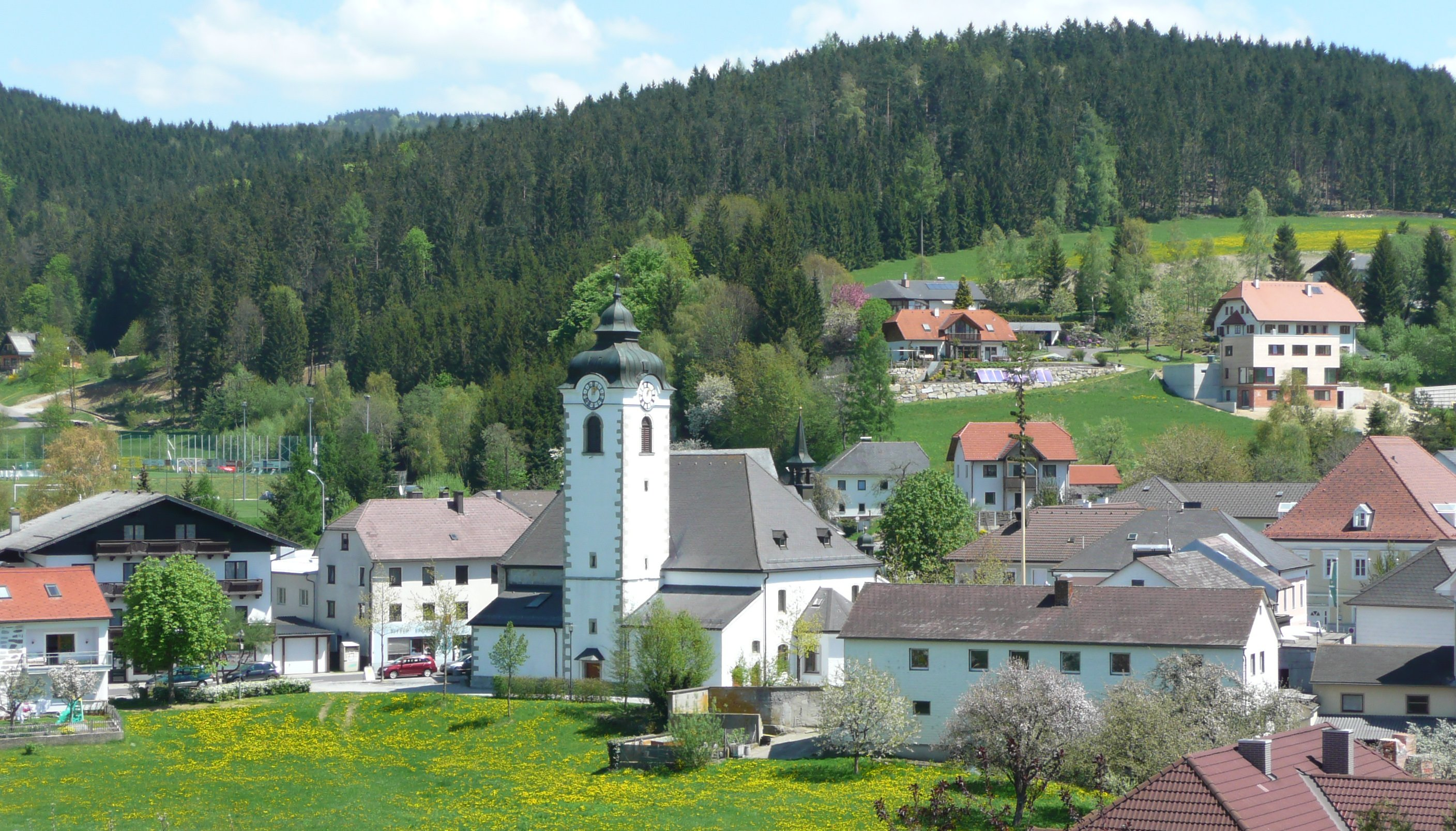

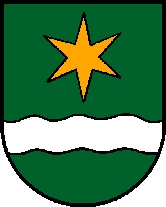
- Coat of arms

- Location within Austria
- Coordinates: 48°33′10″N 14°13′12″E
- Country: Austria
- State: Upper Austria
- District: Urfahr-Umgebung

Government
  - Mayor: Bruno Fröhlich (ÖVP)

Area
  - Total: 63.48 km^{2} (24.51 sq mi)
- Elevation: 705 m (2,313 ft)

Population (2018-01-01)
  - Total: 2,653
  - Density: 41.79/km^{2} (108.2/sq mi)
- Time zone: UTC+1 (CET)
  - Summer (DST): UTC+2 (CEST)
- Postal code: 4191
- Area code: 07219
- Vehicle registration: UU
- Website: www.vorderweissenbach.at

Vorderweißenbach is a municipality in the district of Urfahr-Umgebung in the Austrian state of Upper Austria.

== Population ==
Historical population
Year	Pop.	±%
1991	2,061	—
2001	2,125	+3.1%
