= Vyšší Brod =

- Town
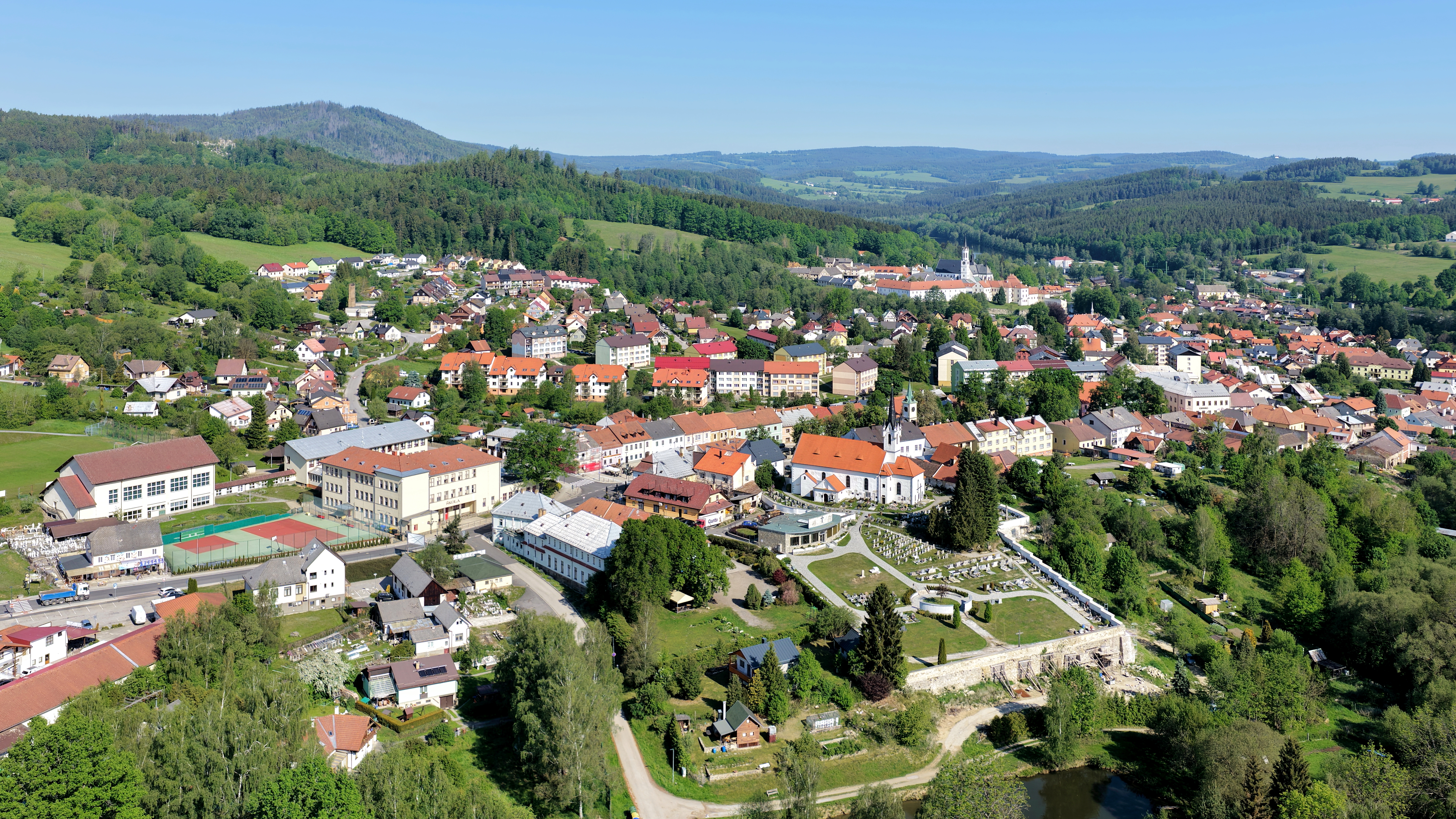
- View from the southeast

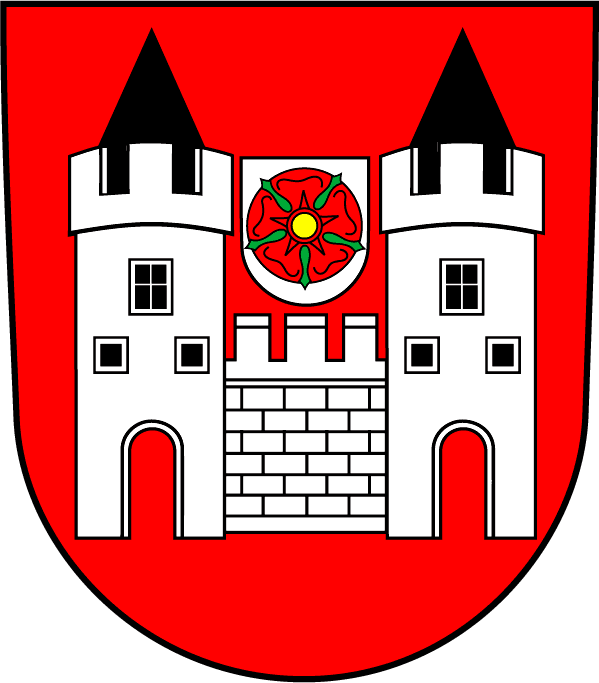
- Flag Coat of arms

- Location in the Czech Republic
- Coordinates: 48°36′58″N 14°18′43″E
- Country: Czech Republic
- Region: South Bohemian
- District: Český Krumlov
- First mentioned: 1259

Government
  - Mayor: Jindřich Hanzlíček

Area
  - Total: 69.75 km^{2} (26.93 sq mi)
- Elevation: 571 m (1,873 ft)

Population (2026-01-01)
  - Total: 2,649
  - Density: 37.98/km^{2} (98.36/sq mi)
- Time zone: UTC+1 (CET)
  - Summer (DST): UTC+2 (CEST)
- Postal code: 382 73
- Website: www.mestovyssibrod.cz

Vyšší Brod (Czech pronunciation: [ˈvɪʃiː ˈbrot]; German: Hohenfurth) is a town in Český Krumlov District in the South Bohemian Region of the Czech Republic. It has about 2,600 inhabitants. The town is located on the Vltava River, on the border between the Bohemian Forest Foothills and the Bohemian Forest mountain range. Located near the border with Austria, it is the southernmost municipality of the Czech Republic.

Vyšší Brod was founded in the 13th century at the latest and became a town in 1870. The main landmark of the town is the Vyšší Brod Monastery, which is protected as national cultural monument. The historic town centre with the monastery complex is well preserved and is protected as an urban monument zone.

== Administrative division ==
Vyšší Brod consists of eight municipal parts (in brackets population according to the 2021 census):

- Vyšší Brod (1,861)
- Dolní Drkolná (22)
- Dolní Jílovice (64)
- Herbertov (13)
- Hrudkov (168)
- Lachovice (45)
- Studánky (206)
- Těchoraz (64)

== Etymology ==
The name literally means 'higher ford' in Czech.

== Geography ==
Vyšší Brod is located about 21 kilometres (13 mi) south of Český Krumlov and 40 km (25 mi) south of České Budějovice. About two thirds of the municipal territory lie in the Bohemian Forest Foothills, only the western part lies in the Bohemian Forest. The highest point is the mountain Jezevčí vrch at 984 m (3,228 ft) above sea level. The municipal territory borders Austria in the south and the Vyšší Brod Pass is located on this state border. Vyšší Brod is the southernmost municipality of the Czech Republic.

The Vltava River flows through the town. The streams Menší Vltavice and Větší Vltavice flow into the Vltava in Vyšší Brod. The Lipno II Reservoir, built on the Vltava, is located on the northern outskirts of the town.

=== Climate ===
Vyšší Brod's climate is classified as humid continental climate (Köppen: Dfb; Trewartha: Dclo). Among them, the annual average temperature is 7.2 °C (45.0 °F), the hottest month in July is 17.0 °C (62.6 °F), and the coldest month is −2.1 °C (28.2 °F) in January. The annual precipitation is 738.5 millimetres (29.07 in), of which July is the wettest with 96.6 millimetres (3.80 in), while April is the driest with only 40.2 millimetres (1.58 in). The extreme temperature throughout the year ranged from −34.0 °C (−29.2 °F) on 10 February 1956 to 36.0 °C (96.8 °F) on 27 July 1983.

Climate data for Vyšší Brod, 1991–2020 normals, extremes 1955–present
| Month | Jan | Feb | Mar | Apr | May | Jun | Jul | Aug | Sep | Oct | Nov | Dec | Year |
|---|---|---|---|---|---|---|---|---|---|---|---|---|---|
| Record high °C (°F) | 17.0 (62.6) | 20.0 (68.0) | 23.7 (74.7) | 29.4 (84.9) | 31.6 (88.9) | 35.0 (95.0) | 36.0 (96.8) | 35.6 (96.1) | 33.3 (91.9) | 27.3 (81.1) | 22.3 (72.1) | 16.5 (61.7) | 36.0 (96.8) |
| Mean daily maximum °C (°F) | 2.3 (36.1) | 4.5 (40.1) | 8.8 (47.8) | 14.4 (57.9) | 18.9 (66.0) | 22.4 (72.3) | 24.3 (75.7) | 24.1 (75.4) | 19.0 (66.2) | 13.9 (57.0) | 7.2 (45.0) | 2.8 (37.0) | 13.6 (56.5) |
| Daily mean °C (°F) | −2.1 (28.2) | −1.1 (30.0) | 2.2 (36.0) | 6.8 (44.2) | 11.8 (53.2) | 15.5 (59.9) | 17.0 (62.6) | 16.2 (61.2) | 11.5 (52.7) | 7.0 (44.6) | 2.6 (36.7) | −1.1 (30.0) | 7.2 (45.0) |
| Mean daily minimum °C (°F) | −6.1 (21.0) | −5.7 (21.7) | −2.7 (27.1) | 0.3 (32.5) | 5.1 (41.2) | 8.9 (48.0) | 10.6 (51.1) | 10.1 (50.2) | 6.5 (43.7) | 2.4 (36.3) | −1.2 (29.8) | −4.7 (23.5) | 2.0 (35.6) |
| Record low °C (°F) | −32.3 (−26.1) | −34.0 (−29.2) | −28.5 (−19.3) | −10.8 (12.6) | −7.6 (18.3) | −3.0 (26.6) | 0.4 (32.7) | 0.7 (33.3) | −5.0 (23.0) | −12.0 (10.4) | −20.2 (−4.4) | −31.3 (−24.3) | −34.0 (−29.2) |
| Average precipitation mm (inches) | 49.5 (1.95) | 41.1 (1.62) | 56.5 (2.22) | 40.2 (1.58) | 76.0 (2.99) | 85.9 (3.38) | 96.6 (3.80) | 91.8 (3.61) | 58.4 (2.30) | 52.1 (2.05) | 42.2 (1.66) | 48.2 (1.90) | 738.5 (29.07) |
| Average snowfall cm (inches) | 26.1 (10.3) | 20.2 (8.0) | 13.2 (5.2) | 3.6 (1.4) | 0.0 (0.0) | 0.0 (0.0) | 0.0 (0.0) | 0.0 (0.0) | 0.0 (0.0) | 0.7 (0.3) | 8.7 (3.4) | 17.8 (7.0) | 90.3 (35.6) |
| Average relative humidity (%) | 84.0 | 79.9 | 77.7 | 74.5 | 74.8 | 75.3 | 76.1 | 78.8 | 82.8 | 84.2 | 86.6 | 86.2 | 80.1 |
| Mean monthly sunshine hours | 52.1 | 82.7 | 127.2 | 172.5 | 191.0 | 201.7 | 218.3 | 211.9 | 149.0 | 113.9 | 55.9 | 45.7 | 1,621.9 |
Source: Czech Hydrometeorological Institute

== History ==
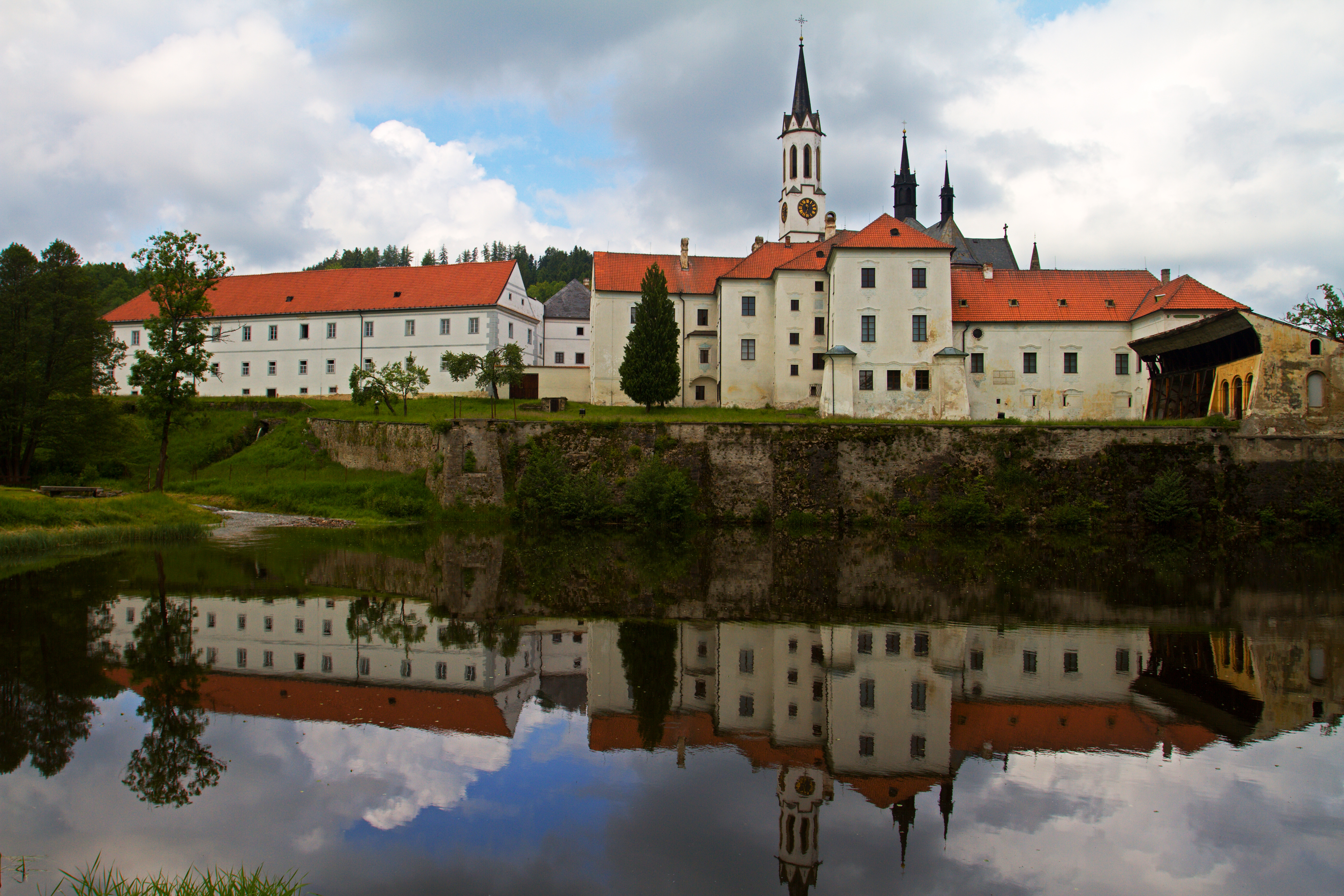
Vyšší Brod Monastery

Vyšší Brod was founded on an old trade route near a ford across the Vltava, hence the name. The first written mention of the settlement is in the deed of foundation of the Cistercian monastery from 1259, where Vok I of Rosenberg confirmed the donation of a large area for the benefit of this monastery and mentioned the market settlement of Vyšší Brod and the church. The settlement was probably founded much earlier.

In 1870, Vyšší Brod was promoted to a town by Emperor Franz Joseph I. After 1918, the coexistence of the German-speaking majority and the Czech minority stabilised. After World War II, most of the German population was expelled and was resettled by mostly non-native population. The Iron Curtain was established and the monastery was forcibly abolished.

After the opening of borders in 1989, the town's importance strongly grew due to the direct road to the border crossing at Studánky / Weigetschlag. In 1990, the monks returned to the monastery.

== Demographics ==
Historical population

| Year | Pop. | ±% |
|---|---|---|
| 1869 | 3,859 | — |
| 1880 | 4,017 | +4.1% |
| 1890 | 4,047 | +0.7% |
| 1900 | 3,937 | −2.7% |
| 1910 | 4,071 | +3.4% |

| Year | Pop. | ±% |
|---|---|---|
| 1921 | 4,003 | −1.7% |
| 1930 | 4,601 | +14.9% |
| 1950 | 2,194 | −52.3% |
| 1961 | 2,201 | +0.3% |
| 1970 | 2,356 | +7.0% |

| Year | Pop. | ±% |
|---|---|---|
| 1980 | 2,595 | +10.1% |
| 1991 | 2,606 | +0.4% |
| 2001 | 2,561 | −1.7% |
| 2011 | 2,447 | −4.5% |
| 2021 | 2,443 | −0.2% |

Source: Censuses

== Transport ==
Vyšší Brod lies on the railway line of local importance from Rybník to Lipno nad Vltavou.

The road border crossing Studánky / Weigetschlag is located at the Vyšší Brod Pass in the municipal territory.

== Sights ==
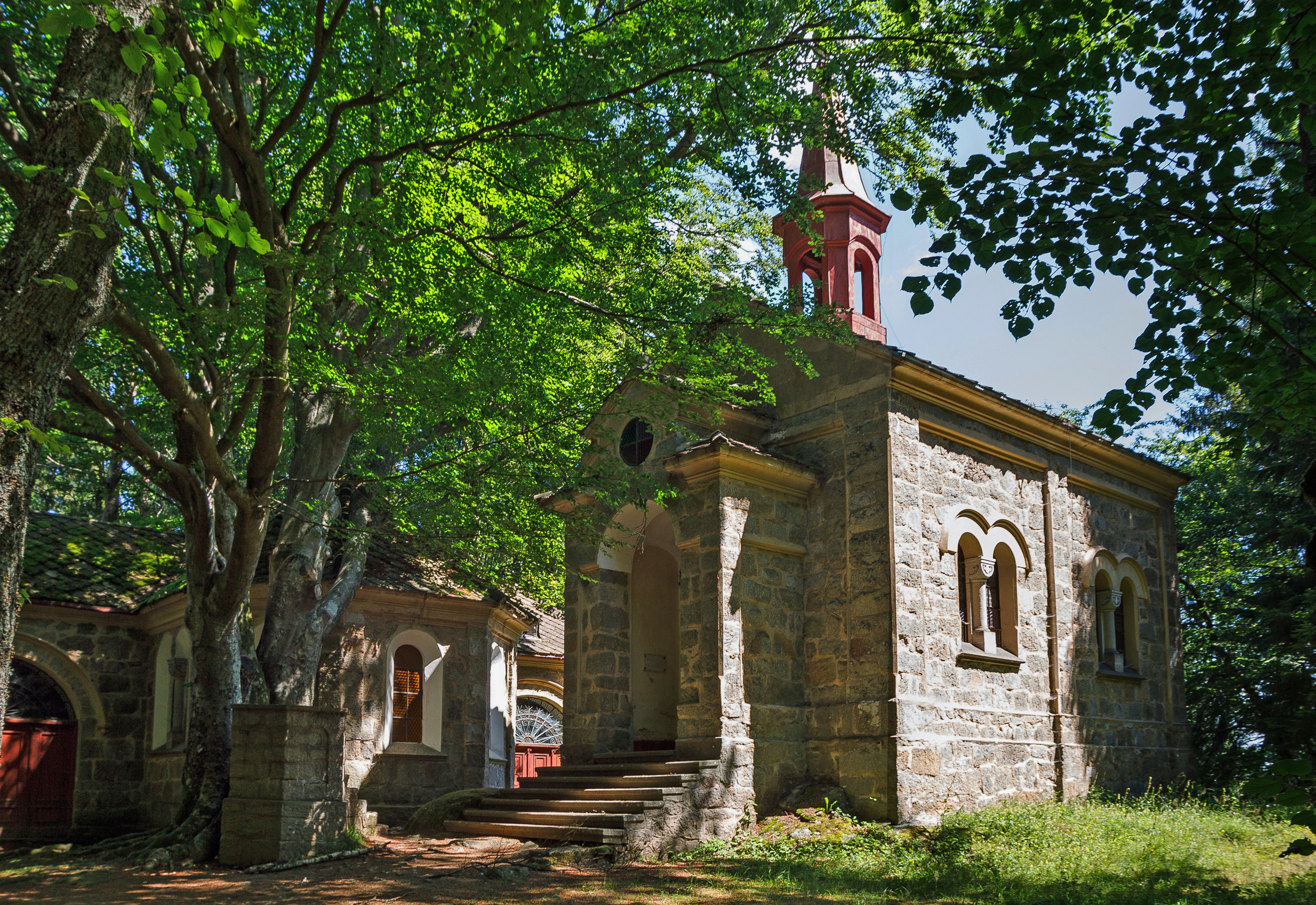
Chapel of Maria Rast

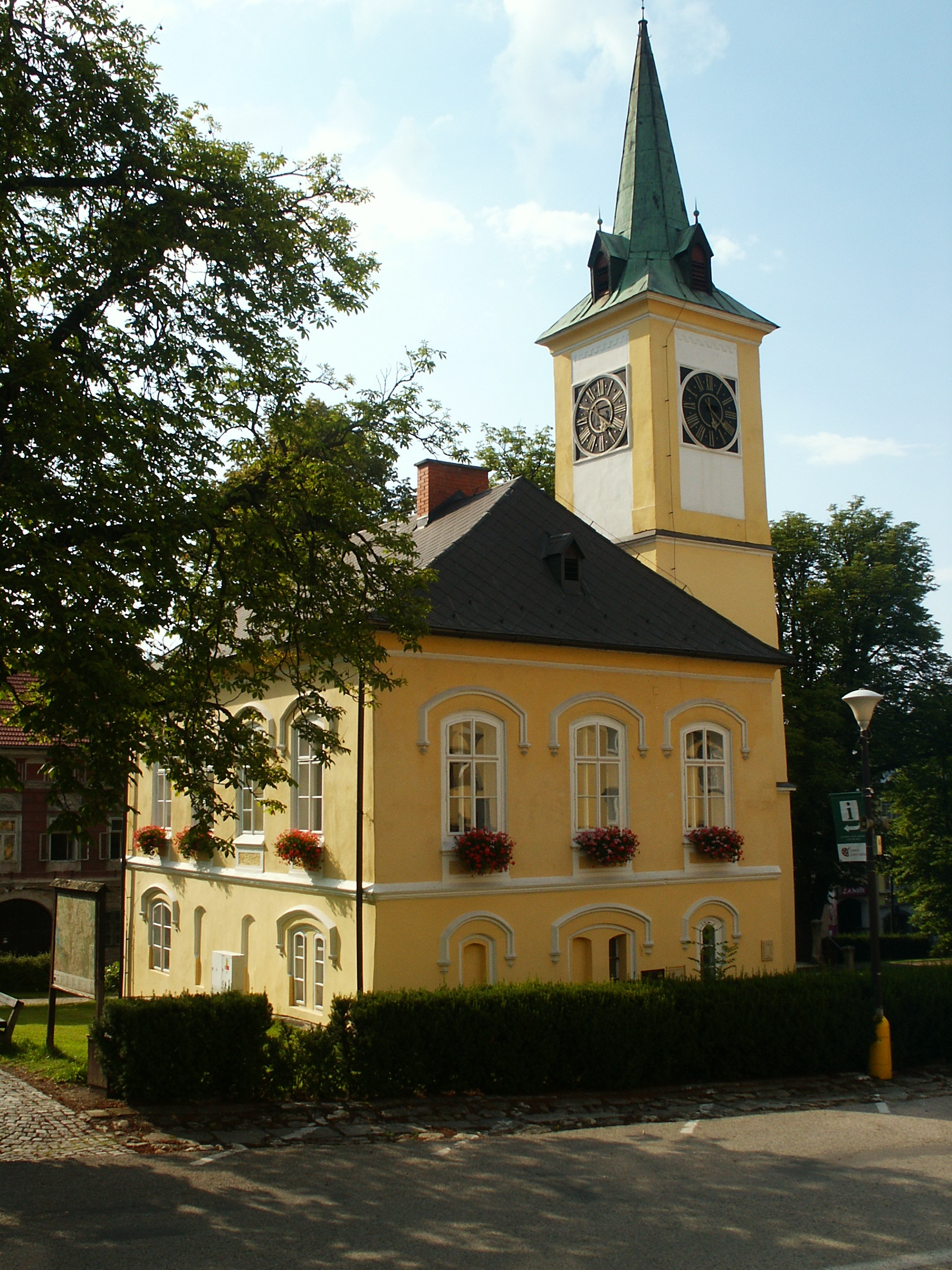
Old Town Hall

The Cistercian Vyšší Brod Monastery with the Church of the Assumption of the Virgin Mary is the most important building and the main landmark of the town. For its value, it is protected as national cultural monument. The monastery complex also houses a postal museum, a branch of the Prague Postal Museum.

The Church of Saint Bartholomew is located on the town square. It was originally an early Gothic building, documented already in 1259, when the monastery was founded. The oldest preserved part of the church is the chancel, which dates from the second half of the 13th century. Modifications were made in the 16th and 17th centuries. In 1715, the church was extended. In the second half of the 19th century, the tower was restored to its Gothic appearance.

The second landmark of the town square is the Old Town Hall. It was originally a house from 1524, which was rebuilt into the town hall after the 1569 fire. Its present neo-Gothic form is a result of the reconstruction from 1883. Until 1947, the building served as a town hall. Today it houses the tourist infocentre.

In Loučovice is a Marian pilgrimage site called Maria Rast. The pilgrimage tradition began there in 1844. The complex of the pseudo-Gothic buildings with the Chapel of Maria Rast was built in 1888–1890. The way to the chapel is lined by the Stations of the Cross dating from 1898.

== Notable people ==
- Leopold Wackarž (1810–1901), Cistercian abbot general, died here
- Franz Isidor Proschko (1816–1891), Austrian writer

== Honours ==
The asteroid No. 121089, which was discovered in 1999 by Miloš Tichý from the Kleť Observatory, was named after the town.
