= Granite and Gneiss Plateau =

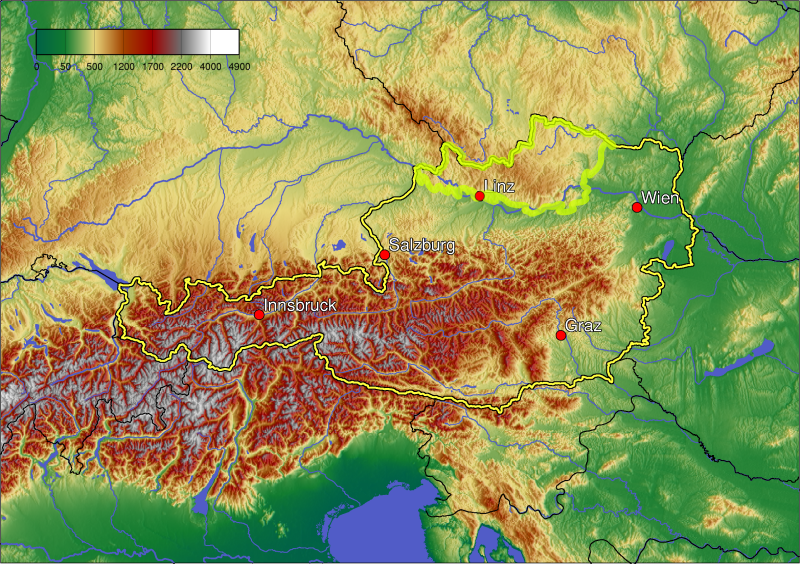
Physical map of Austria: north of the Danube is the Gneiss and Granite Highland outlined in green

The Gneiss and Granite Plateau (German: Granit- und Gneisplateau, also called the Granite and Gneiss Highland (Granit- und Gneishochland), is one of the five major landscapes in Austria. It forms the Mühlviertel and Waldviertel in the states of Upper and Lower Austria. Geologically it is the Austrian part of the Bohemian Massif.
