= Mühlkreis =

Mühlkreis may refer to:

- See Mühlviertel
- Aigen im Mühlkreis, municipality in the district of Rohrbach in Upper Austria
- Allerheiligen im Mühlkreis, municipality in the district Perg in Upper Austria
- Hagenberg im Mühlkreis, town in the district of Freistadt in Upper Austria in Austria
- Haibach im Mühlkreis, municipality in the district of Urfahr-Umgebung in Upper Austria
- Hirschbach im Mühlkreis, municipality in the district of Freistadt in Upper Austria
- Hofkirchen im Mühlkreis, municipality in the district of Rohrbach in Upper Austria
- Kleinzell im Mühlkreis, municipality in the district of Rohrbach in Upper Austria
- Lembach im Mühlkreis, municipality in the district of Rohrbach in Upper Austria
- Lichtenau im Mühlkreis, municipality in the district of Rohrbach in Upper Austria
- Mühlkreis Autobahn (A7) is 27 km motorway (or Autobahn) in upper Austria
- Neumarkt im Mühlkreis, municipality in the district of Freistadt in Upper Austria
- Neustift im Mühlkreis, municipality in the district of Rohrbach in Upper Austria
- Ottenschlag im Mühlkreis, municipality in the district of Urfahr-Umgebung in Upper Austria
- Pfarrkirchen im Mühlkreis, municipality in the district of Rohrbach in Upper Austria
- Rainbach im Mühlkreis, municipality in the district of Freistadt in Upper Austria
- Reichenau im Mühlkreis, municipality in the district of Urfahr-Umgebung in Upper Austria
- Sankt Gotthard im Mühlkreis, municipality in the district of Urfahr-Umgebung in Upper Austria
- Sankt Martin im Mühlkreis, municipality in the district of Rohrbach in Upper Austria
- Sankt Ulrich im Mühlkreis, municipality in the district of Rohrbach in Upper Austria
- Sankt Veit im Mühlkreis, municipality in the district of Rohrbach in Upper Austria
- Schönau im Mühlkreis, municipality in the district of Freistadt in Upper Austria
- Sonnberg im Mühlkreis, municipality in the district of Urfahr-Umgebung in Upper Austria
