= Krien =

Krien may refer to:

== People ==
- Anna Krien, Australian journalist and author
- Daniela Krien (born 1975), German actress
- Ferdinand Krien, German diplomat
- Paul Krien (1873–1935), German cinematographer
- Werner Krien (1912–1975), German cinematographer

== Places ==
- Krien, Mecklenburg-Vorpommern, Germany
- Krien, German name of Krzynia, Poland
- Krien, Atzesberg, Austria
- Krien, Putzleinsdorf, Austria
- Krien, Rohrbach-Berg, Austria
