= Ahorn =

Ahorn is the German-language word for Maple.

Ahorn may refer to:

== Mountains ==
- Ahorn, mountain in the Napf region, Switzerland
- Ahorn-Alp, mountain in the Napf region, Switzerland
- Ahornspitze, mountain in the Zillertal Alps, Tyrol, Austria

== Towns ==
- Ahorn, Austria
- Ahorn, village and municipality of Bad Ischl, Austria
- Ahorn, village and municipality of Lunz am See, Austria
- Ahorn, Baden-Württemberg, Germany
- Ahorn, Bavaria, Germany
- Ahorn, hamlet in the Schwende District, Switzerland
