= Kirchberg ob der Donau =

- Municipality
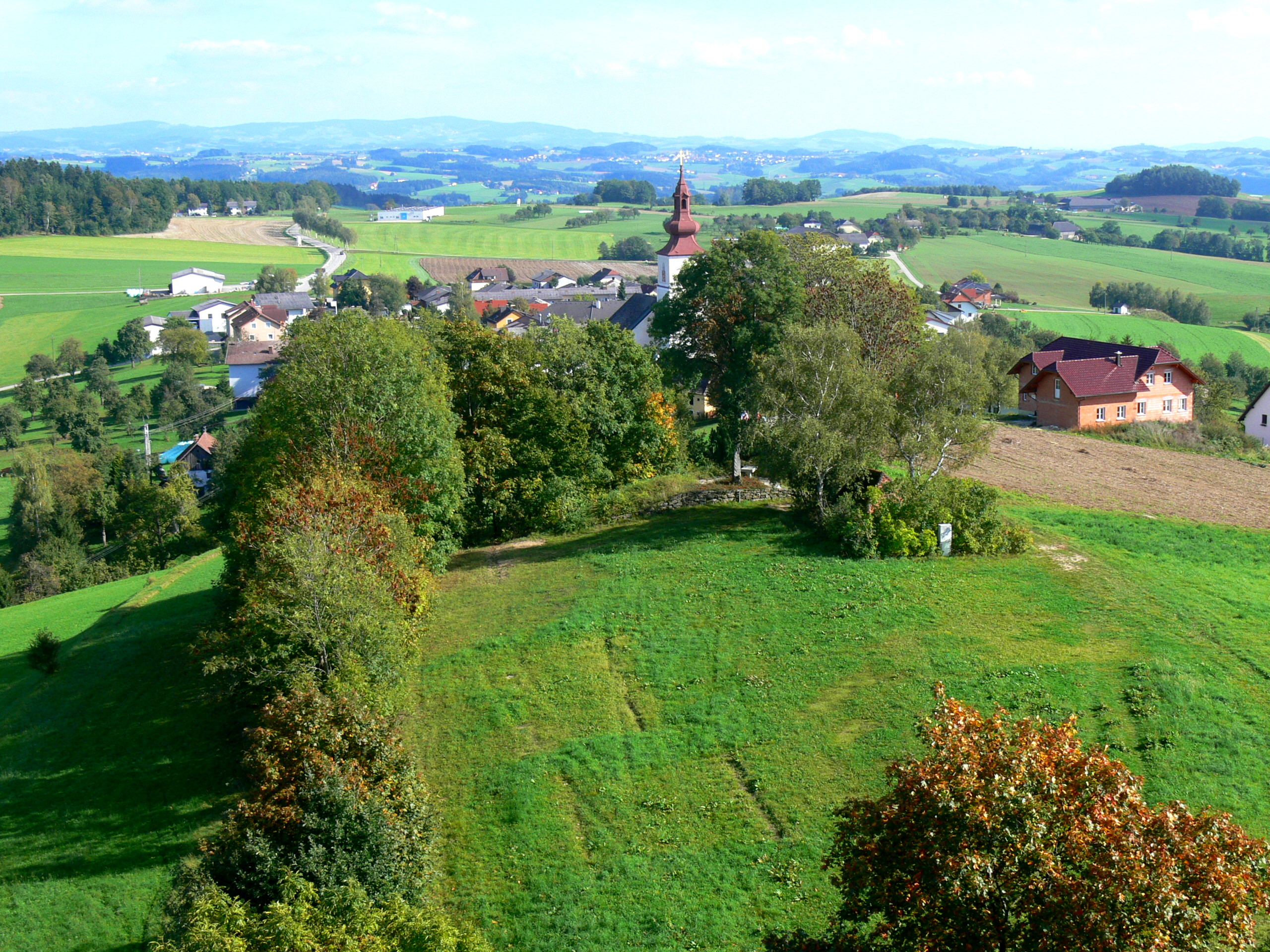

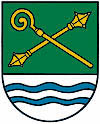
- Coat of arms

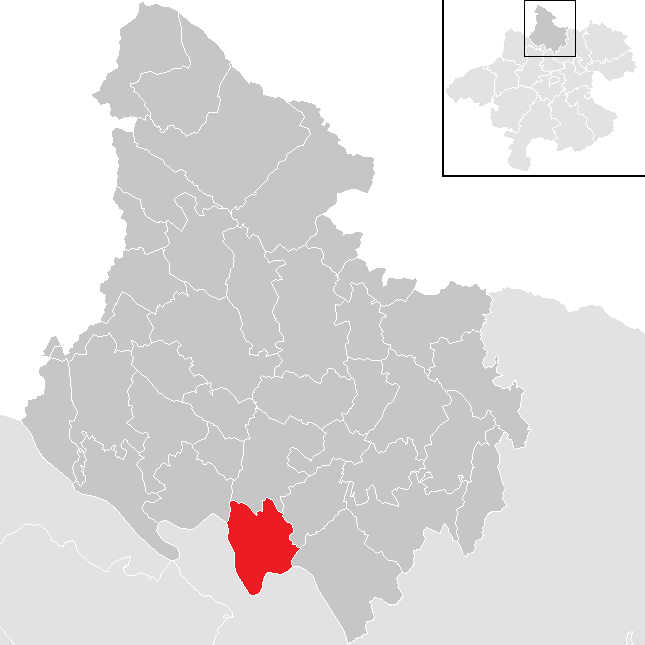
- Location in the district

- Location within Austria
- Coordinates: 48°26′42″N 13°56′10″E
- Country: Austria
- State: Upper Austria
- District: Rohrbach

Government
  - Mayor: Stefan Reisinger (ÖVP)

Area
  - Total: 21.33 km^{2} (8.24 sq mi)
- Elevation: 591 m (1,939 ft)

Population (2018-01-01)
  - Total: 1,055
  - Density: 49.46/km^{2} (128.1/sq mi)
- Time zone: UTC+1 (CET)
  - Summer (DST): UTC+2 (CEST)
- Postal code: 4131
- Area code: 07282
- Vehicle registration: RO
- Website: www.kirchberg-donau.at

Kirchberg ob der Donau is a municipality in Rohrbach, Austria.

== Notable events ==
On 28 October 2024, the municipality's mayor Franz Hofer was shot and killed in Altenfelden following a dispute over hunting rights.

== Population ==
Historical population
Year	Pop.	±%
1869	1,178	—
1880	1,268	+7.6%
1890	1,290	+1.7%
1900	1,163	−9.8%
1910	1,233	+6.0%
1923	1,266	+2.7%
1934	1,232	−2.7%
1939	1,191	−3.3%
1951	1,117	−6.2%
1961	1,047	−6.3%
1971	1,116	+6.6%
1981	1,115	−0.1%
1991	1,108	−0.6%
2001	1,123	+1.4%
2011	1,084	−3.5%
2015	1,048	−3.3%

== Landmarks ==
In 2020, a new observation tower "Donau am Berg" was built 10 minutes from the town center. Formally opened in July 2021, it has 103 steps leading up to a 26-meter-high platform, offering views of the Danube valley, the Sauwald forest, and the Mühlviertel.
