= Ferdinand Stamm =

Bohemian-Austrian writer (1813–1880)

Ferdinand Stamm (pseudonym Fernand; 11 May 1813 – 29 July 1880), was a Bohemian-Austrian writer, industrialist and politician. Stamm was born in Orpus (Mezilesí) near Preßnitz (Přisečnice) in the Bohemian Ore Mountains in the present-day Czech Republic. The son of a small mine owner who died when he was young, Stamm attended school in Duppau (Doupov) and then Saaz (Žatec). He began working as a journalist and private tutor while at Prague University, and, after graduating, joined the Viennese literary scene, producing essays, sketches, and a novel, Leben und Lieben, Dichten und Trachten des Amtsschreibers Michael Häderlein (1845). In 1848 he became a member of the Kremsier (Kroměříž) Imperial Diet, the editor of the Deutsche Zeitung aus Boehmen, and a mining entrepreneur. The following year he moved to Komotau (Chomutov), where he wrote on the living conditions of workers in the Ore Mountains. In 1856 he returned to Vienna, where he founded several short-lived periodicals and directed large railway, mining, and iron concerns. In the 1860s he helped establish, and curated, the Austrian Museum for Arts and Industry, and served in the Bohemian Diet and the Austrian Imperial Diet. After losing most of his fortune in the 1874 crash, he worked as a journalist and died at Pötzleinsdorf, Vienna.
