= Sankt Oswald bei Haslach =

- Municipality
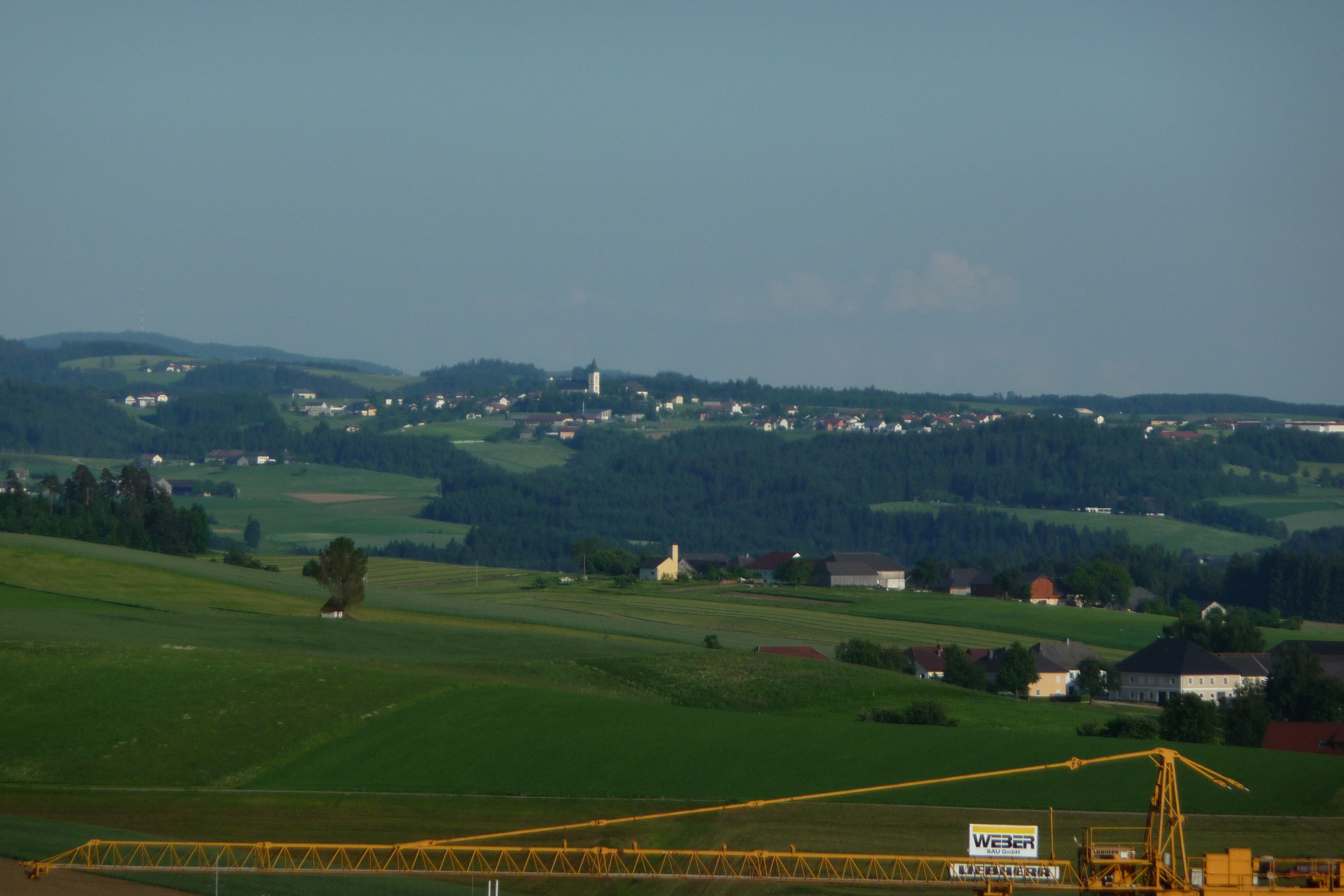

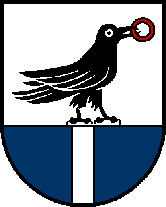
- Coat of arms

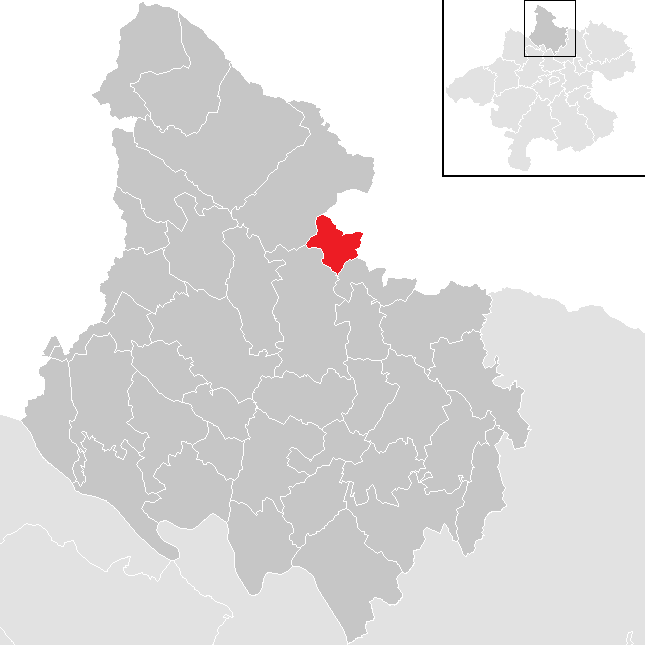
- Location in the district

- Location within Austria
- Coordinates: 48°37′11″N 14°01′54″E
- Country: Austria
- State: Upper Austria
- District: Rohrbach

Government
  - Mayor: Paul Mathe (ÖVP)

Area
  - Total: 8.12 km^{2} (3.14 sq mi)
- Elevation: 658 m (2,159 ft)

Population (2018-01-01)
  - Total: 501
  - Density: 61.7/km^{2} (160/sq mi)
- Time zone: UTC+1 (CET)
  - Summer (DST): UTC+2 (CEST)
- Postal code: 4170
- Area code: 07289
- Vehicle registration: RO

Sankt Oswald bei Haslach is an Austrian municipality located in the state of Upper Austria in the district of Rohrbach.

== Population ==
Historical population
Year	Pop.	±%
1869	589	—
1880	614	+4.2%
1890	540	−12.1%
1900	502	−7.0%
1910	447	−11.0%
1923	438	−2.0%
1934	433	−1.1%
1939	417	−3.7%
1951	465	+11.5%
1961	458	−1.5%
1971	491	+7.2%
1981	531	+8.1%
1991	570	+7.3%
2001	567	−0.5%
2011	497	−12.3%
2017	498	+0.2%
