= Haslach an der Mühl =

- Municipality
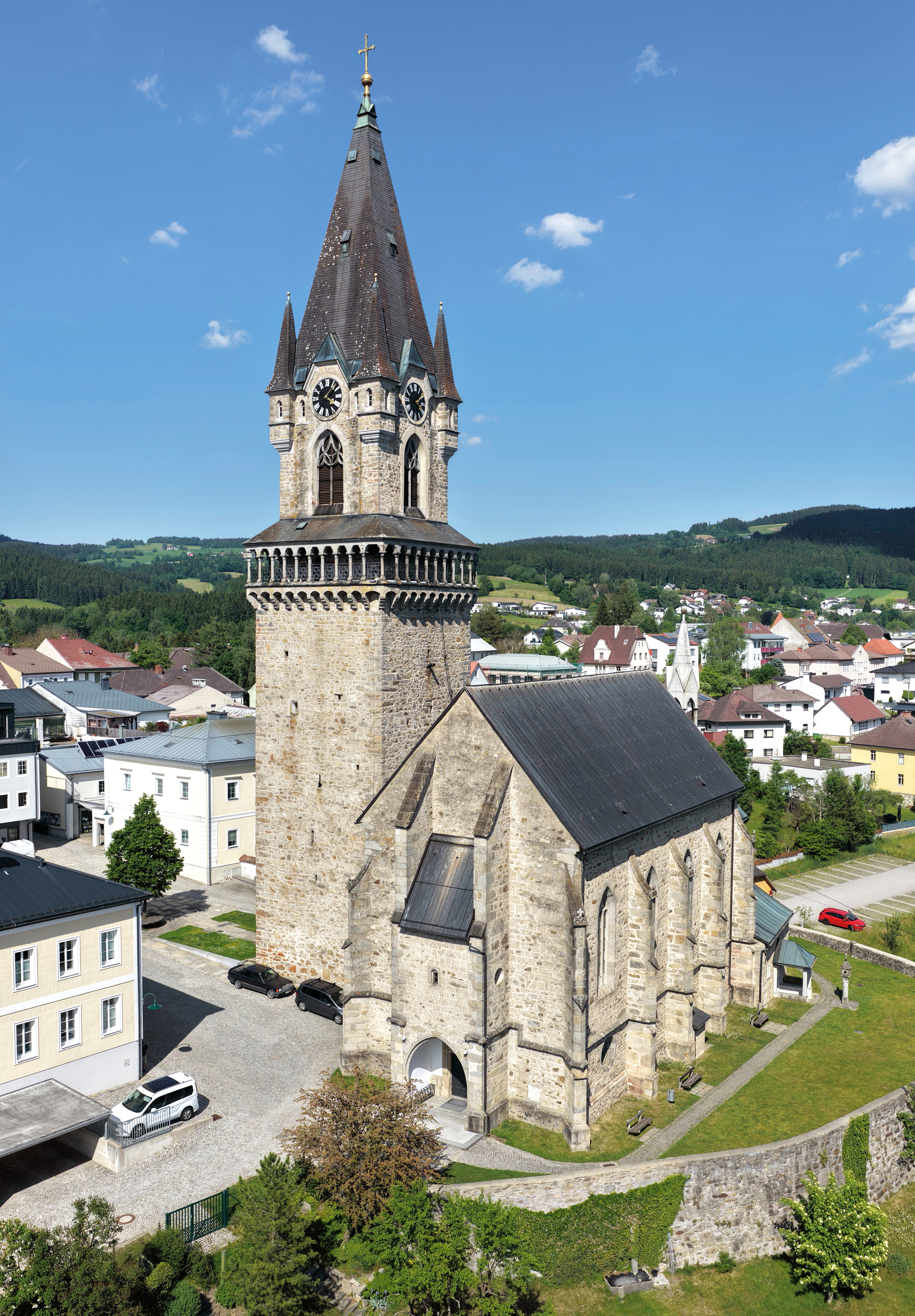

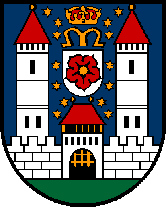
- Coat of arms

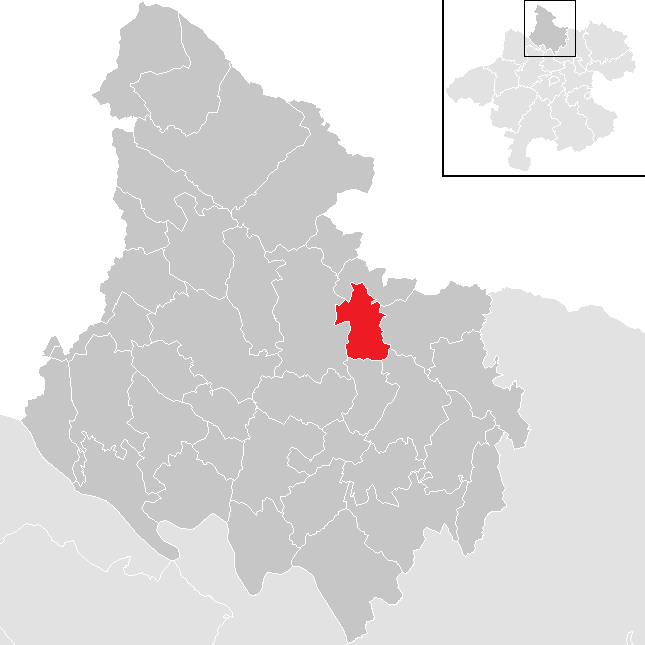
- Location in the district

- Location within Austria
- Coordinates: 48°34′43″N 14°02′07″E
- Country: Austria
- State: Upper Austria
- District: Rohrbach

Government
  - Mayor: Dominik Reisinger (SPÖ)

Area
  - Total: 12.42 km^{2} (4.80 sq mi)
- Elevation: 530 m (1,740 ft)

Population (2018-01-01)
  - Total: 2,536
  - Density: 204.2/km^{2} (528.8/sq mi)
- Time zone: UTC+1 (CET)
  - Summer (DST): UTC+2 (CEST)
- Postal code: 4170
- Area code: 0 72 89
- Vehicle registration: RO
- Website: www.haslach.at

Haslach an der Mühl is a municipality in the district of Rohrbach in the Austrian state of Upper Austria.

== Geography ==
Haslach lies in the upper Mühlviertel. About 33 percent of the municipality is forest, and 57 percent is farmland.
