= Julbach, Austria =

Julbach
- Municipality
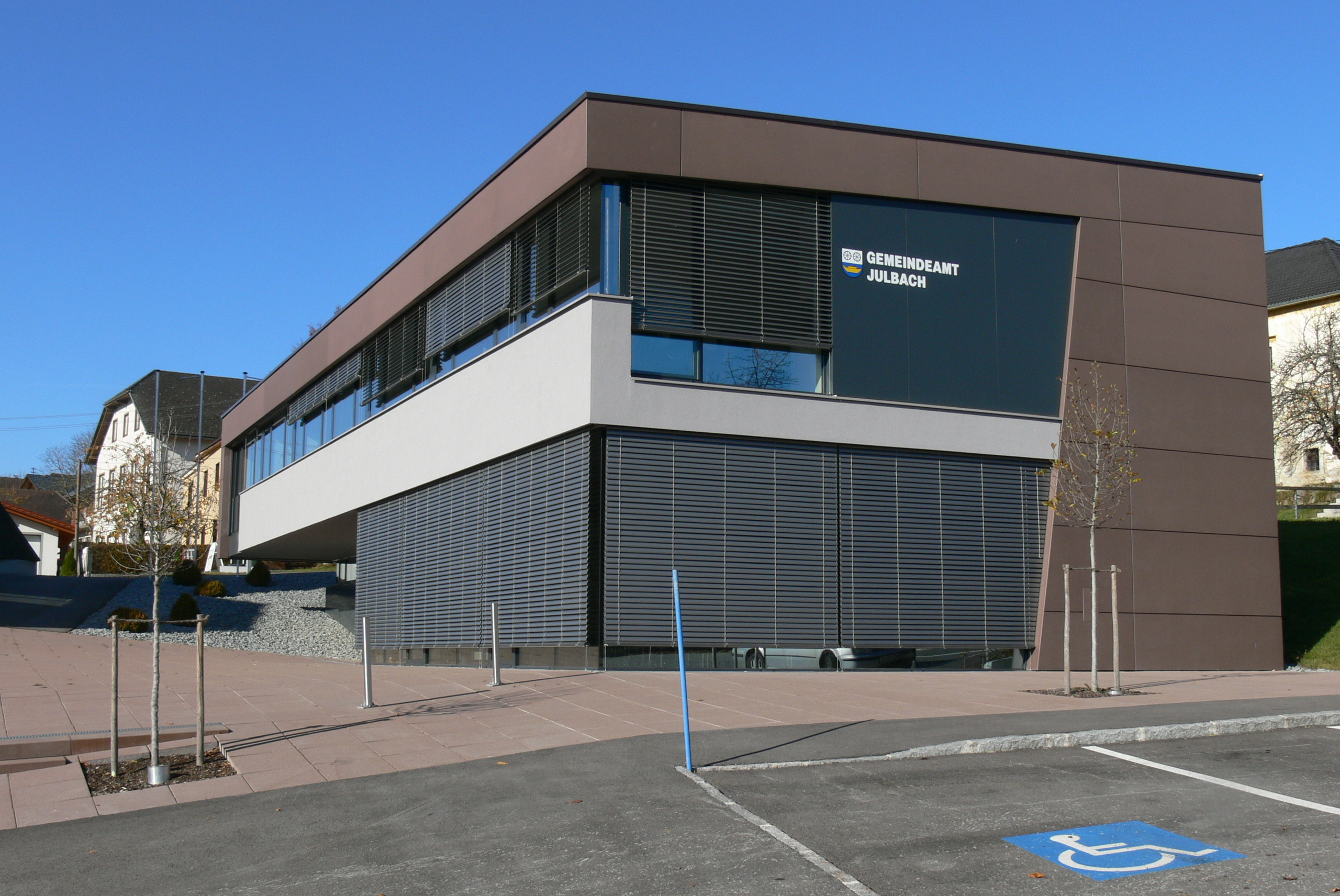
- Municipal office

- Coat of arms

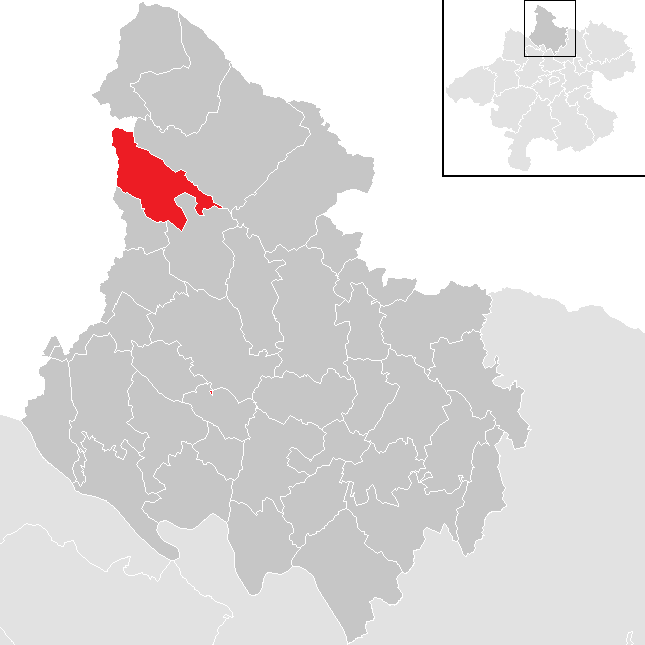
- Location in the district

- Location within Austria
- Coordinates: 48°39′32″N 13°52′05″E
- Country: Austria
- State: Upper Austria
- District: Rohrbach

Government
  - Mayor: Johannes Plattner (SPÖ)

Area
  - Total: 21.73 km^{2} (8.39 sq mi)
- Elevation: 589 m (1,932 ft)

Population (2018-01-01)
  - Total: 1,537
  - Density: 70.73/km^{2} (183.2/sq mi)
- Time zone: UTC+1 (CET)
  - Summer (DST): UTC+2 (CEST)
- Postal code: 4162
- Area code: 07288
- Vehicle registration: RO
- Website: www.julbach.ooe.gv.at

Julbach is a municipality in the district of Rohrbach in the Austrian state of Upper Austria.

== Population ==
Historical population
Year	Pop.	±%
1869	1,867	—
1880	1,897	+1.6%
1890	1,784	−6.0%
1900	1,748	−2.0%
1910	1,681	−3.8%
1923	1,648	−2.0%
1934	1,660	+0.7%
1939	1,609	−3.1%
1951	1,673	+4.0%
1961	1,668	−0.3%
1971	1,629	−2.3%
1981	1,681	+3.2%
1991	1,648	−2.0%
2001	1,654	+0.4%
2011	1,594	−3.6%
2015	1,537	−3.6%
