= Arnreit =

- Municipality
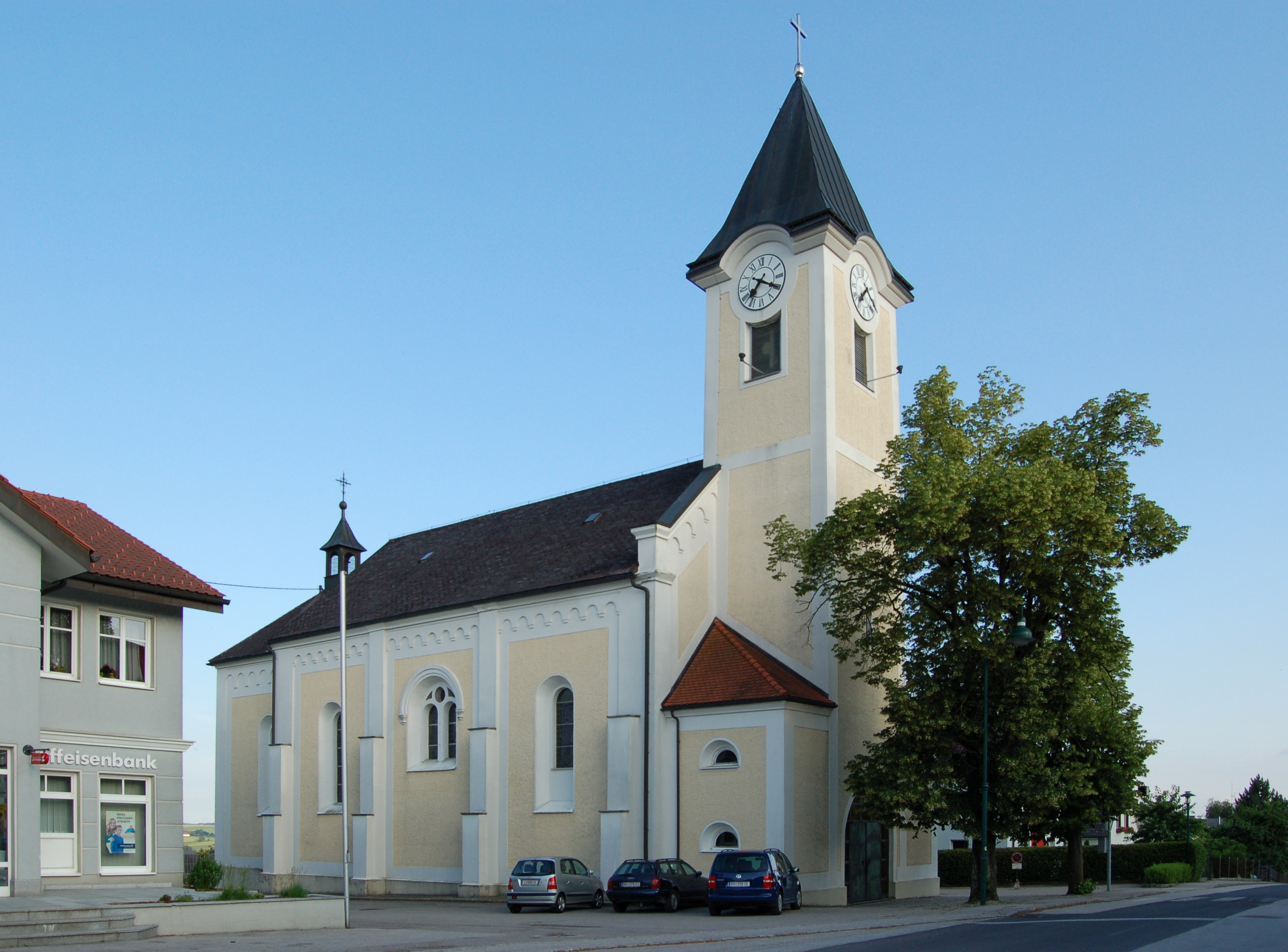

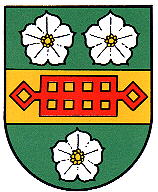
- Coat of arms

- Location within Austria
- Coordinates: 48°31′33″N 13°59′45″E
- Country: Austria
- State: Upper Austria
- District: Rohrbach

Government
  - Mayor: Heinz Kobler (ÖVP)

Area
  - Total: 20.35 km^{2} (7.86 sq mi)
- Elevation: 604 m (1,982 ft)

Population (2018-01-01)
  - Total: 1,154
  - Density: 56.71/km^{2} (146.9/sq mi)
- Time zone: UTC+1 (CET)
  - Summer (DST): UTC+2 (CEST)
- Postal code: 4122
- Area code: 07282
- Vehicle registration: RO
- Website: www.arnreit.at

Arnreit is a municipality in Upper Austria in the Rohrbach District. As of 1 January 2018, it had a population of 1154 inhabitants. Arnreit is located at an altitude of 604m above sea level in the central area of the Rohrbach district in Mühlviertel.

== Population ==
Historical population
Year	Pop.	±%
1869	1,027	—
1880	1,086	+5.7%
1890	1,062	−2.2%
1900	1,014	−4.5%
1910	990	−2.4%
1923	1,011	+2.1%
1934	1,023	+1.2%
1939	999	−2.3%
1951	996	−0.3%
1961	982	−1.4%
1971	982	+0.0%
1981	1,032	+5.1%
1991	1,053	+2.0%
2001	1,101	+4.6%
2011	1,136	+3.2%
2017	1,154	+1.6%

== Localities ==
The municipality includes the following localities (with population as of January 1, 2018):

- Arnreit (141)
- Daim (118)
- Eckersberg (41)
- Etzerreit (57)
- Getzing (24)
- Stallion (16)
- Högling (15)
- Hölling (86)
- Humenberg (73)
- Iglbach (0)
- Katzenbach (29)
- Liebenstein (182)
- Moosham (41)
- Partenreit (88)
- Schoenberg (10)
- Schoersching (43)
- Stierberg (88)
- Untergahleiten (39)
- Wippling (63)
