= Rohrbach District =

Coordinates: 48.544°N 13.973°E

Rohrbach District Bezirk Rohrbach
- District
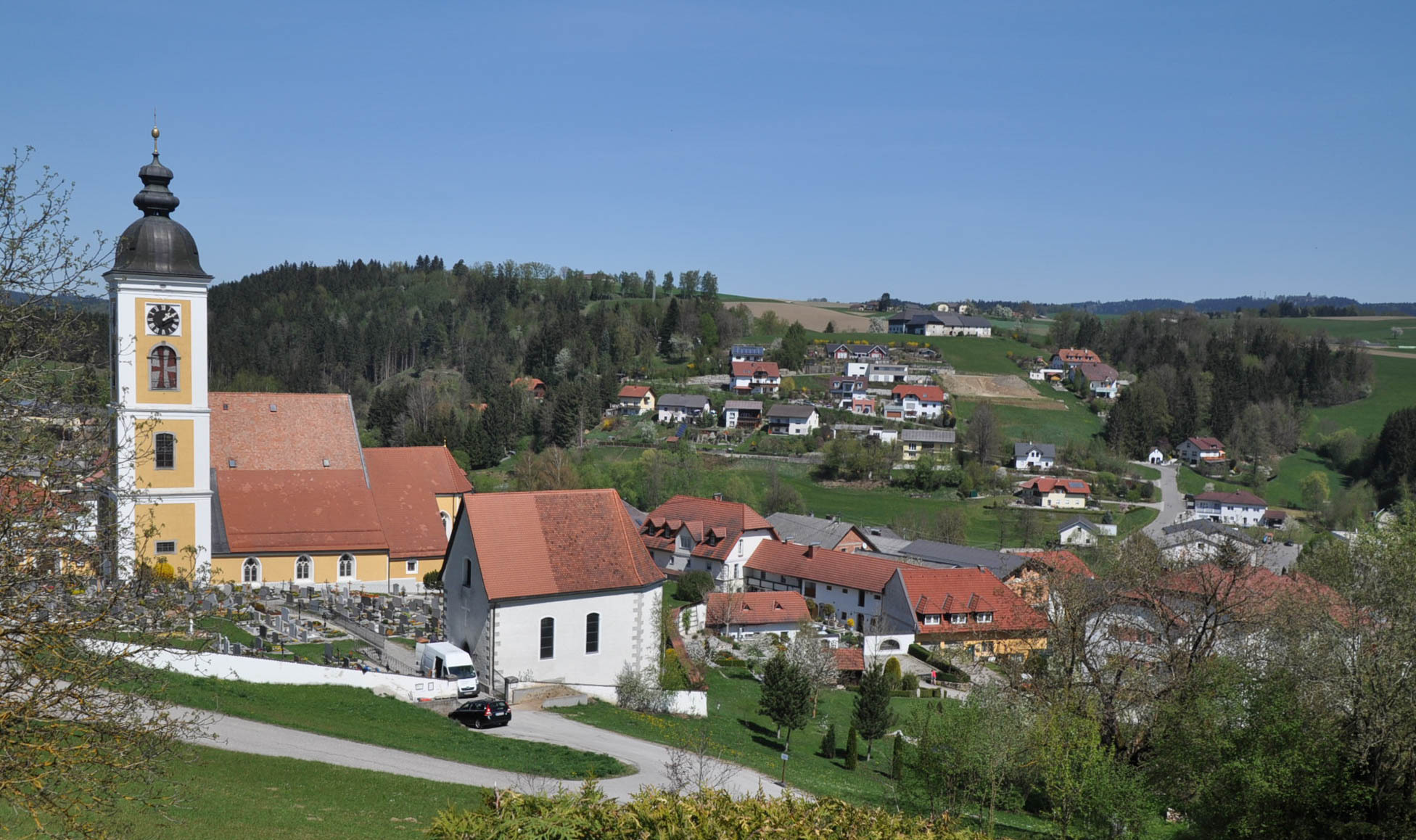
- View of Niederwaldkirchen
- Country: Austria
- State: Upper Austria
- Number of municipalities: 40
- Administrative seat: Rohrbach-Berg

Government
  - District Governor: Valentin Pühringer

Area
  - Total: 828.0 km^{2} (319.7 sq mi)

Population (01.01.2021)
  - Total: 62,461
  - Density: 75.44/km^{2} (195.4/sq mi)
- Time zone: UTC+01:00 (CET)
  - Summer (DST): UTC+02:00 (CEST)
- Vehicle registration: RO

Bezirk Rohrbach is a district in the state of Upper Austria in Austria.

== Municipalities ==
Towns (Städte) are indicated in boldface; market towns (Marktgemeinden) in italics; suburbs, hamlets and other subdivisions of a municipality are indicated in small characters.

- Afiesl
- Ahorn
- Aigen-Schlägl
- Altenfelden
- Arnreit
- Atzesberg
- Auberg
- Haslach an der Mühl
- Helfenberg
- Hofkirchen im Mühlkreis
- Hörbich
- Julbach
- Kirchberg ob der Donau
- Klaffer am Hochficht
- Kleinzell im Mühlkreis
- Kollerschlag
- Lembach im Mühlkreis
- Lichtenau im Mühlkreis
- Nebelberg
- Neufelden
- Neustift im Mühlkreis
- Niederkappel
- Niederwaldkirchen
- Oberkappel
- Oepping
- Peilstein im Mühlviertel
- Pfarrkirchen im Mühlkreis
- Putzleinsdorf
- **Rohrbach-Berg**
- Sankt Johann am Wimberg
- Sankt Martin im Mühlkreis
- Sankt Oswald bei Haslach
- Sankt Peter am Wimberg
- Sankt Stefan am Walde
- Sankt Ulrich im Mühlkreis
- Sankt Veit im Mühlkreis
- Sarleinsbach
- Schwarzenberg am Böhmerwald
- Ulrichsberg
