= Sankt Johann am Wimberg =

- Municipality
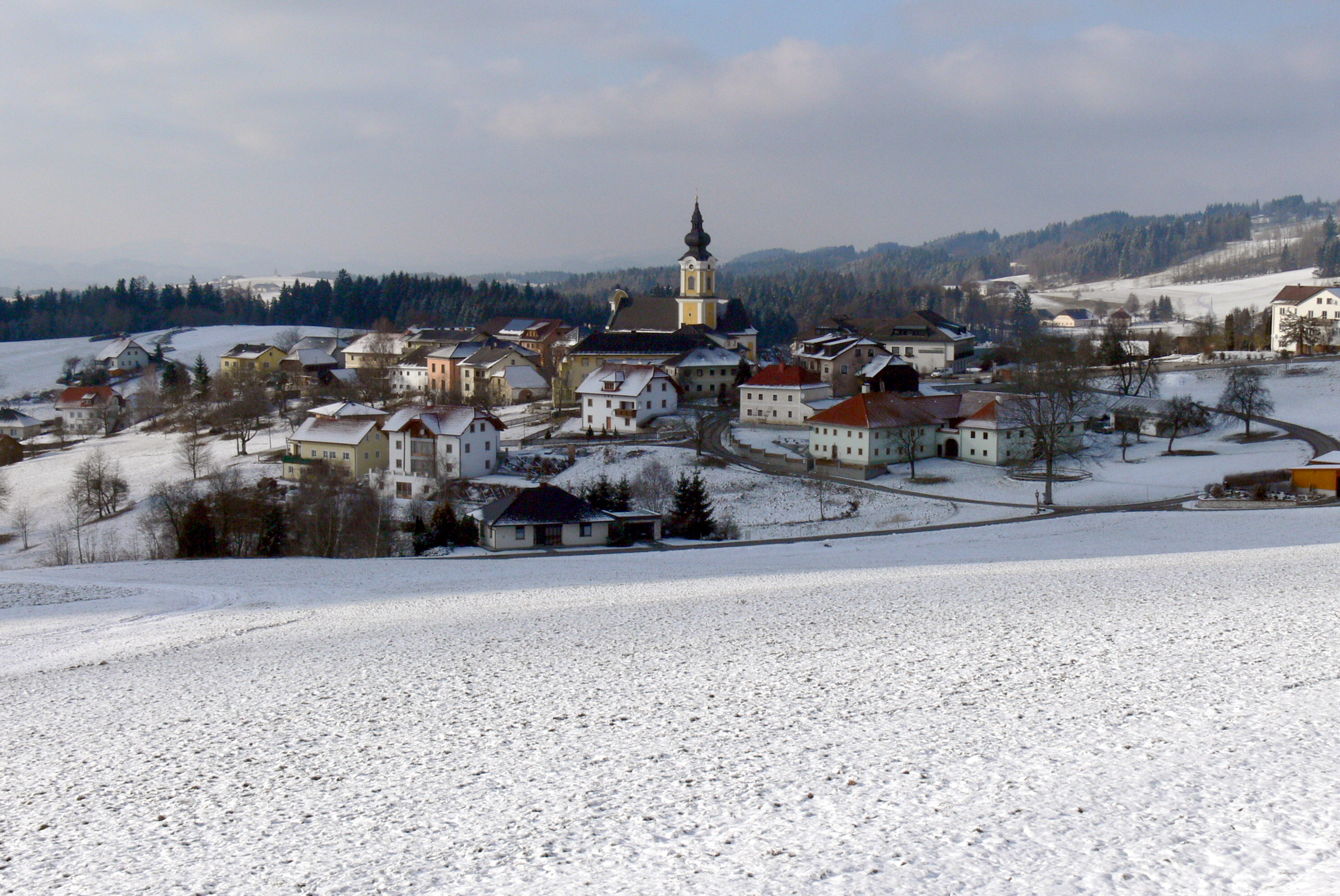

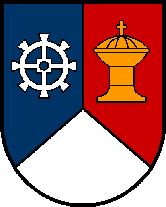
- Coat of arms

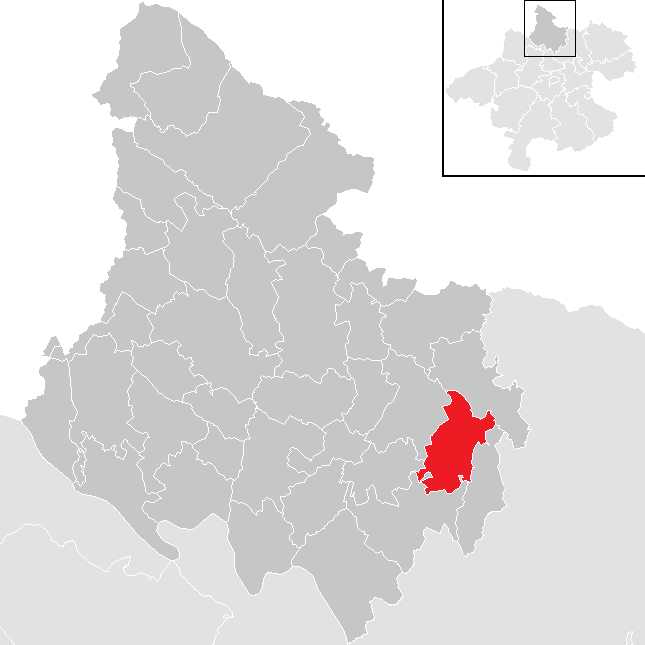
- Location in the district

- Location within Austria
- Coordinates: 48°29′19″N 14°07′51″E
- Country: Austria
- State: Upper Austria
- District: Rohrbach

Government
  - Mayor: Albert Stürmer (ÖVP)

Area
  - Total: 19.77 km^{2} (7.63 sq mi)
- Elevation: 720 m (2,360 ft)

Population (2018-01-01)
  - Total: 1,029
  - Density: 52.05/km^{2} (134.8/sq mi)
- Time zone: UTC+1 (CET)
  - Summer (DST): UTC+2 (CEST)
- Postal code: 4172
- Area code: 07217
- Vehicle registration: RO
- Website: www.stjohannamwimberg.at

Sankt Johann am Wimberg is a municipality in the district of Rohrbach in the Austrian state of Upper Austria.

== Geography ==
Sankt Johann am Wimberg lies in the eastern part of the district of Rohrbach in the upper Mühlviertel. In terms of the nature conservation spatial division, the south-western part of the municipal area belongs to the Central Mühlviertel Highlands spatial unit, while the north-eastern part belongs to the Southern Bohemian Forest Foothills spatial unit. It extends 7.3 kilometers from north to south and 5.9 kilometers from west to east, with a total area of 19.77 square kilometers.

This puts St. Johann am Wimberg in the middle of the district's municipalities. With 51 inhabitants per km^{2}, the municipality was again in the lower midfield of the district's municipalities in 2013. The municipal area extends over an average altitude of 650 to 750 meters, with the Hansberg representing the highest point of the municipality at 850 meters. The lowest point is around 560 meters on the northern border of the municipality.

In 2001, 29.5 percent of the municipality's area was forested and 66.5 percent was used for agriculture. In comparison with the federal state of Upper Austria, St. Johann am Wimberg is therefore significantly less forested than the state average (Upper Austria: 38.3 percent) and has considerably more agricultural land (Upper Austria: 49.3 percent). At 4.0 percent, the proportion of other uses (building land, gardens, bodies of water and others) is well below the Upper Austrian average of 13.8 percent.

Neighboring municipalities are Helfenberg in the north, St. Veit im Mühlkreis in the east, Niederwaldkirchen in the south, St. Ulrich im Mühlkreis in the southwest and St. Peter am Wimberg in the west.
