= Neufelden =

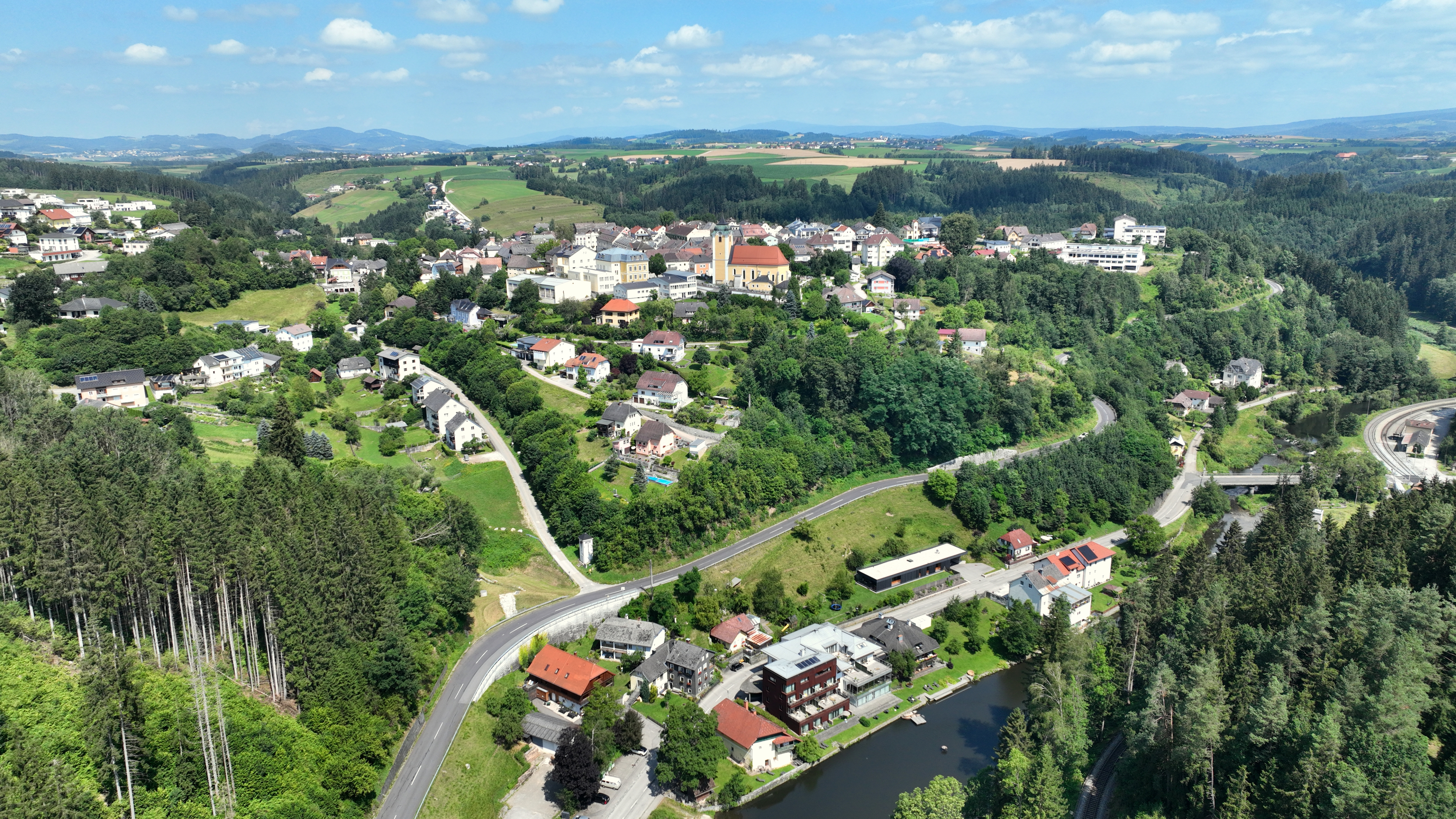
- South view of Neufelden in Upper Austria

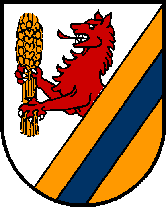
- Coat of arms

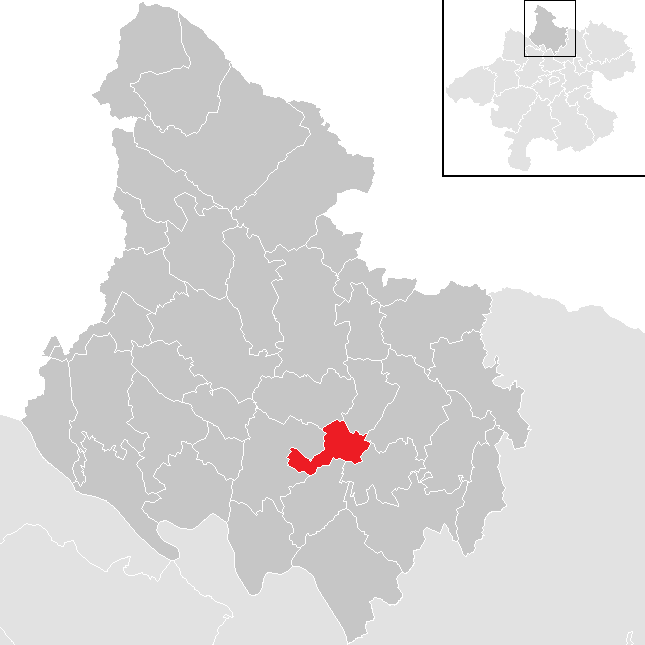
- Location in the district

- Location within Austria
- Coordinates: 48°29′03″N 14°00′07″E
- Country: Austria
- State: Upper Austria
- District: Rohrbach

Government
  - Mayor: Hubert Hartl (ÖVP)

Area
  - Total: 9.81 km^{2} (3.79 sq mi)
- Elevation: 517 m (1,696 ft)

Population (2018-01-01)
  - Total: 1,276
  - Density: 130/km^{2} (337/sq mi)
- Time zone: UTC+1 (CET)
  - Summer (DST): UTC+2 (CEST)
- Postal code: 4120
- Area code: 07282
- Vehicle registration: RO
- Website: www.neufelden.at

Neufelden is a municipality in the district of Rohrbach in the Austrian state of Upper Austria.

== Population ==
Historical population
Year	Pop.	±%
1869	1,175	—
1880	1,279	+8.9%
1890	1,203	−5.9%
1900	1,178	−2.1%
1910	1,117	−5.2%
1923	1,224	+9.6%
1934	1,133	−7.4%
1939	1,048	−7.5%
1951	1,051	+0.3%
1961	1,031	−1.9%
1971	1,109	+7.6%
1981	1,161	+4.7%
1991	1,236	+6.5%
2001	1,242	+0.5%
2011	1,273	+2.5%
2017	1,294	+1.6%
