= Nebelberg =

- Municipality
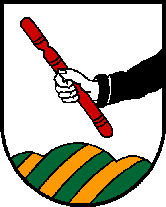
- Coat of arms

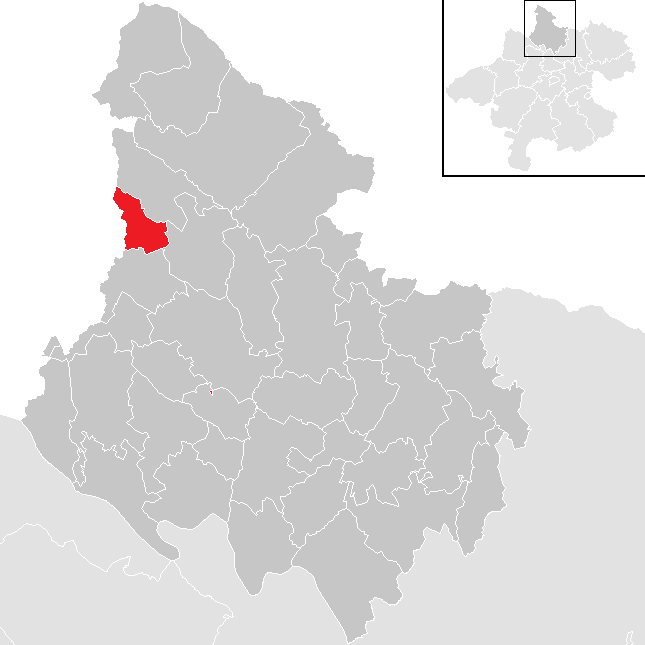
- Location in the district

- Location within Austria
- Coordinates: 48°37′44″N 13°50′51″E
- Country: Austria
- State: Upper Austria
- District: Rohrbach

Government
  - Mayor: Markus Steininger (SPÖ)

Area
  - Total: 9.18 km^{2} (3.54 sq mi)
- Elevation: 695 m (2,280 ft)

Population (2018-01-01)
  - Total: 632
  - Density: 68.8/km^{2} (178/sq mi)
- Time zone: UTC+1 (CET)
  - Summer (DST): UTC+2 (CEST)
- Postal code: 4155
- Area code: 07287
- Vehicle registration: RO
- Website: www.nebelberg.ooe.gv.at

Nebelberg is a municipality in the district of Rohrbach in the Austrian state of Upper Austria.

== Population ==
Historical population
Year	Pop.	±%
1869	855	—
1880	835	−2.3%
1890	814	−2.5%
1900	760	−6.6%
1910	700	−7.9%
1923	672	−4.0%
1934	650	−3.3%
1939	614	−5.5%
1951	601	−2.1%
1961	641	+6.7%
1971	634	−1.1%
1981	613	−3.3%
1991	632	+3.1%
2001	641	+1.4%
2011	619	−3.4%
2017	635	+2.6%
