= Auberg =

- Municipality
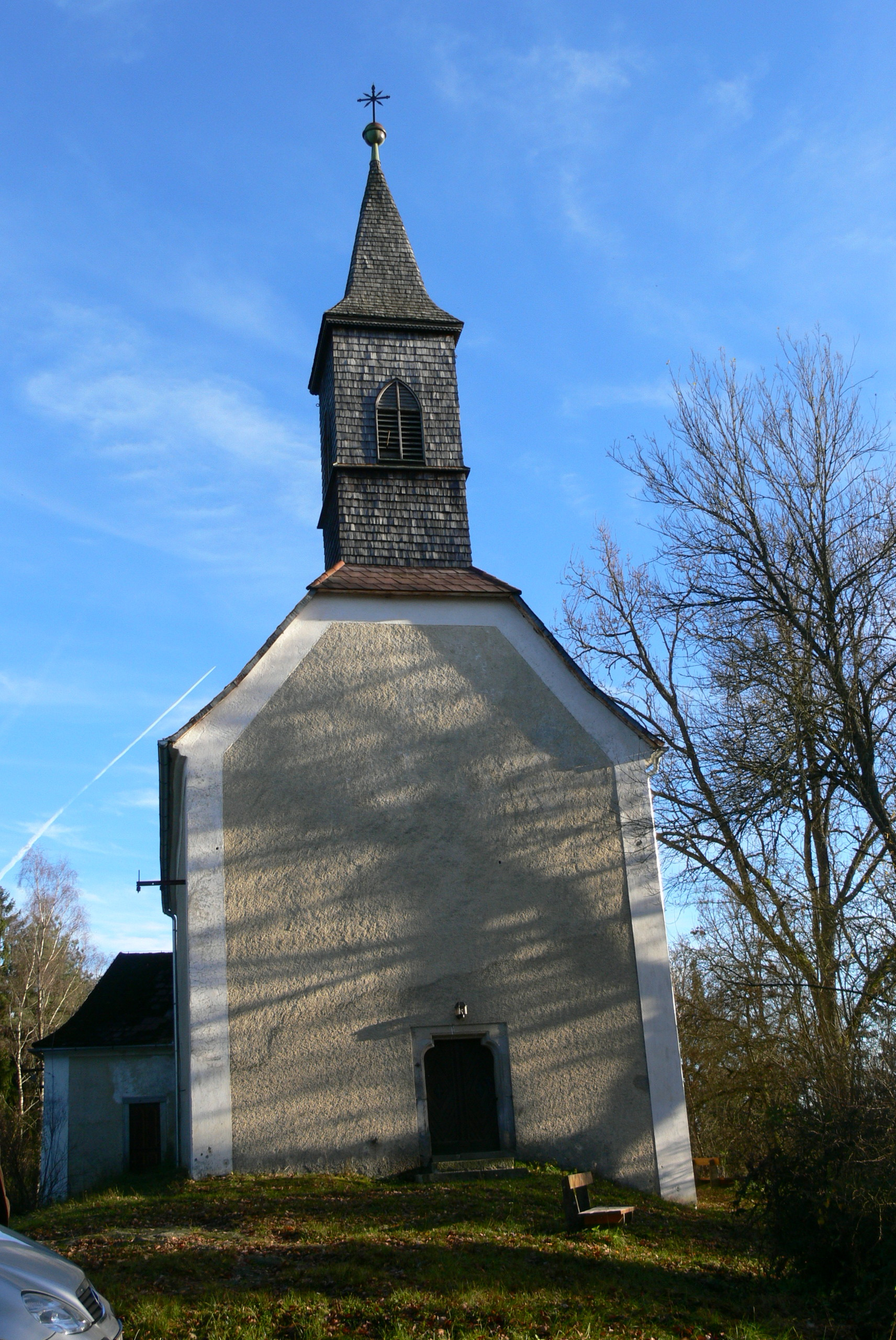

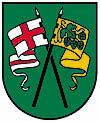
- Coat of arms

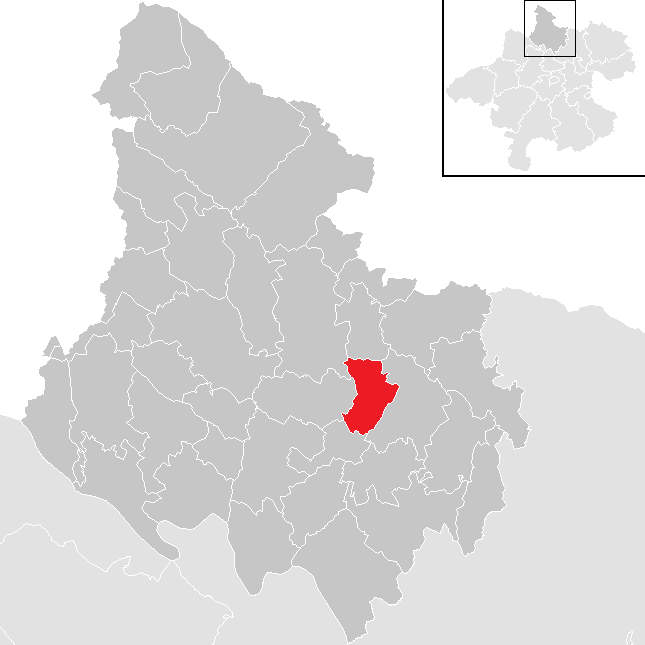
- Location in the district

- Location within Austria
- Coordinates: 48°32′40″N 14°03′12″E
- Country: Austria
- State: Upper Austria
- District: Rohrbach

Government
  - Mayor: Michael Lehner (ÖVP)

Area
  - Total: 12.52 km^{2} (4.83 sq mi)
- Elevation: 595 m (1,952 ft)

Population (2018-01-01)
  - Total: 551
  - Density: 44.0/km^{2} (114/sq mi)
- Time zone: UTC+1 (CET)
  - Summer (DST): UTC+2 (CEST)
- Postal code: 4171
- Area code: 07282
- Vehicle registration: RO
- Website: www.auberg.at

Auberg is a municipality in the district of Rohrbach in the Austrian state of Upper Austria.

== Geography ==
Auberg lies in the Mühlviertel. About 26 percent of the municipality is forest, and 69 percent is farmland.
