= Oepping =

- Municipality
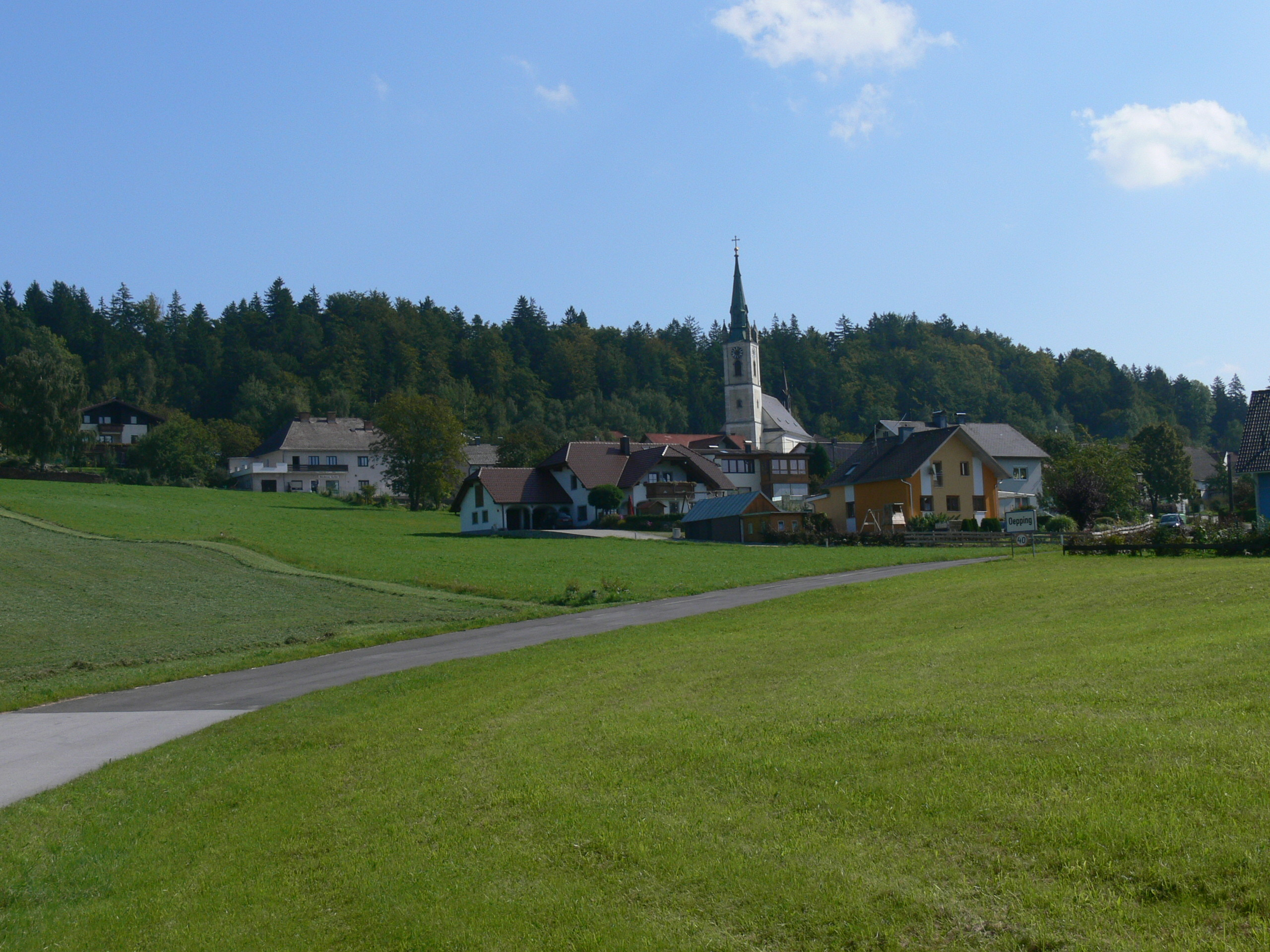

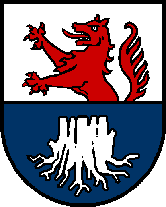
- Coat of arms

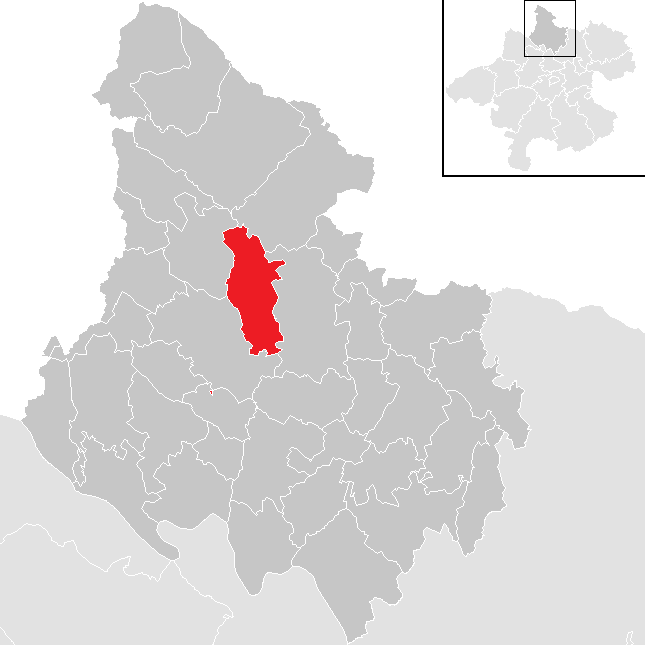
- Location in the district

- Location within Austria
- Coordinates: 48°36′14″N 13°56′46″E
- Country: Austria
- State: Upper Austria
- District: Rohrbach

Government
  - Mayor: Thomas Bogner (ÖVP)

Area
  - Total: 22.99 km^{2} (8.88 sq mi)
- Elevation: 629 m (2,064 ft)

Population (2018-01-01)
  - Total: 1,510
  - Density: 65.7/km^{2} (170/sq mi)
- Time zone: UTC+1 (CET)
  - Summer (DST): UTC+2 (CEST)
- Postal code: 4151
- Area code: 07289
- Vehicle registration: RO

Oepping is a municipality in the district of Rohrbach in the Austrian state of Upper Austria.

== Geography ==
Oepping lies in the Mühlviertel. About 24 percent of the municipality is forest, and 70 percent is farmland.
