= Klaffer am Hochficht =

- Municipality
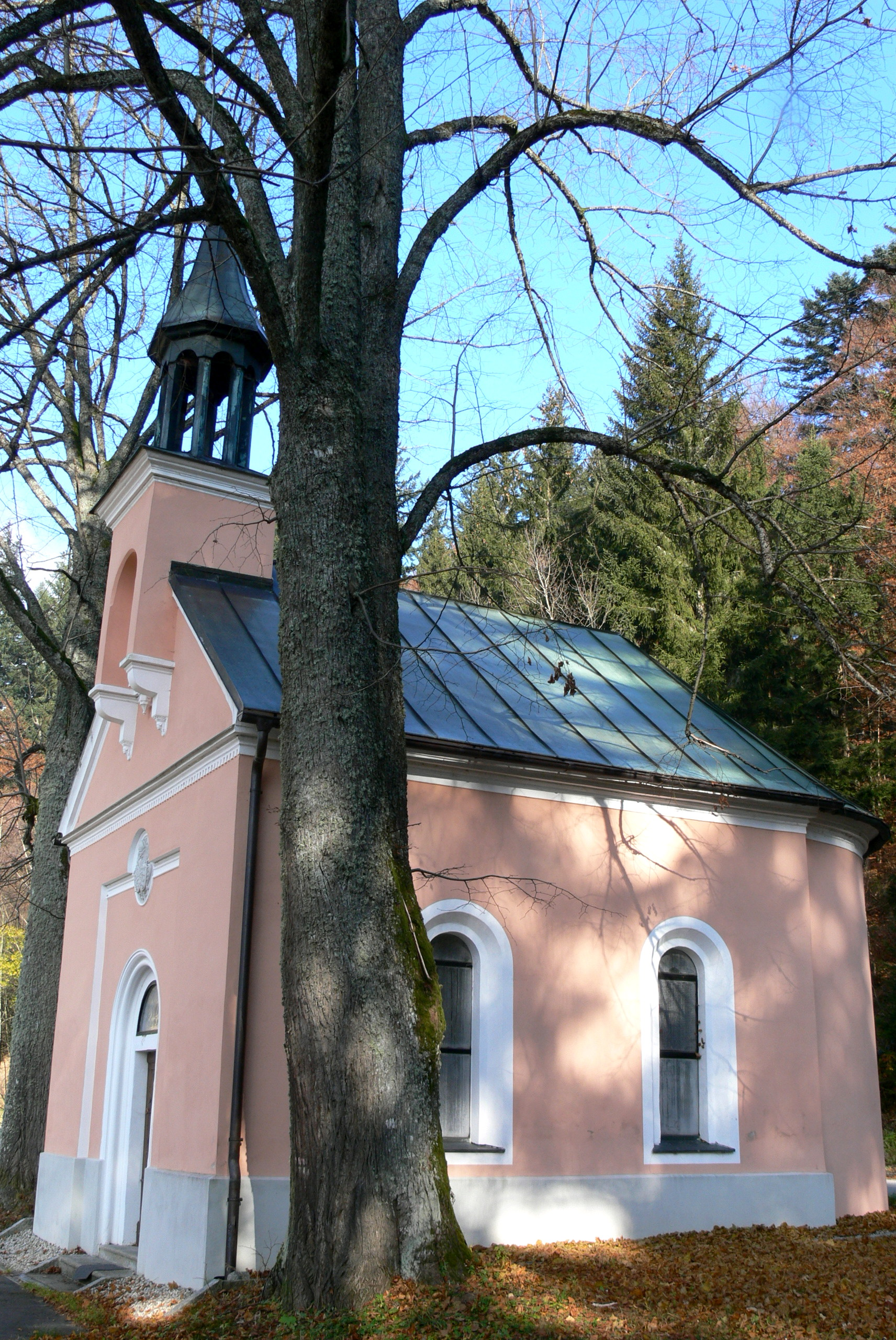

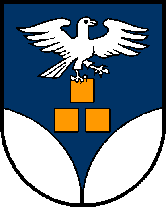
- Coat of arms

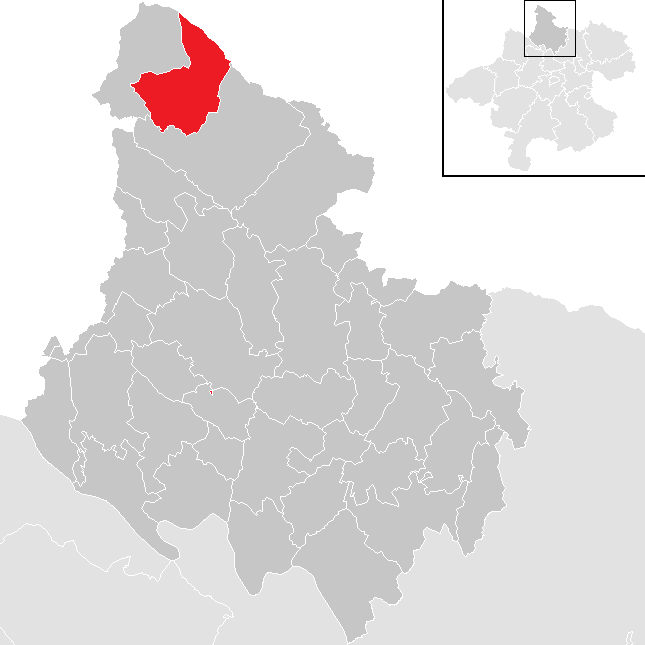
- Location in the district

- Location within Austria
- Coordinates: 48°41′40″N 13°53′10″E
- Country: Austria
- State: Upper Austria
- District: Rohrbach

Government
  - Mayor: Franz Wagner (ÖVP)

Area
  - Total: 28.02 km^{2} (10.82 sq mi)
- Elevation: 638 m (2,093 ft)

Population (2018-01-01)
  - Total: 1,311
  - Density: 46.79/km^{2} (121.2/sq mi)
- Time zone: UTC+1 (CET)
  - Summer (DST): UTC+2 (CEST)
- Postal code: 4163
- Area code: 07288
- Vehicle registration: RO
- Website: www.klaffer.ooe.gv.at

Klaffer am Hochficht is a municipality in the district of Rohrbach in the Austrian state of Upper Austria.

== Geography ==
Klaffer lies in the Mühlviertel. About 60 percent of the municipality is forest, and 38 percent is farmland.
