= Sankt Peter am Wimberg =

- Municipality
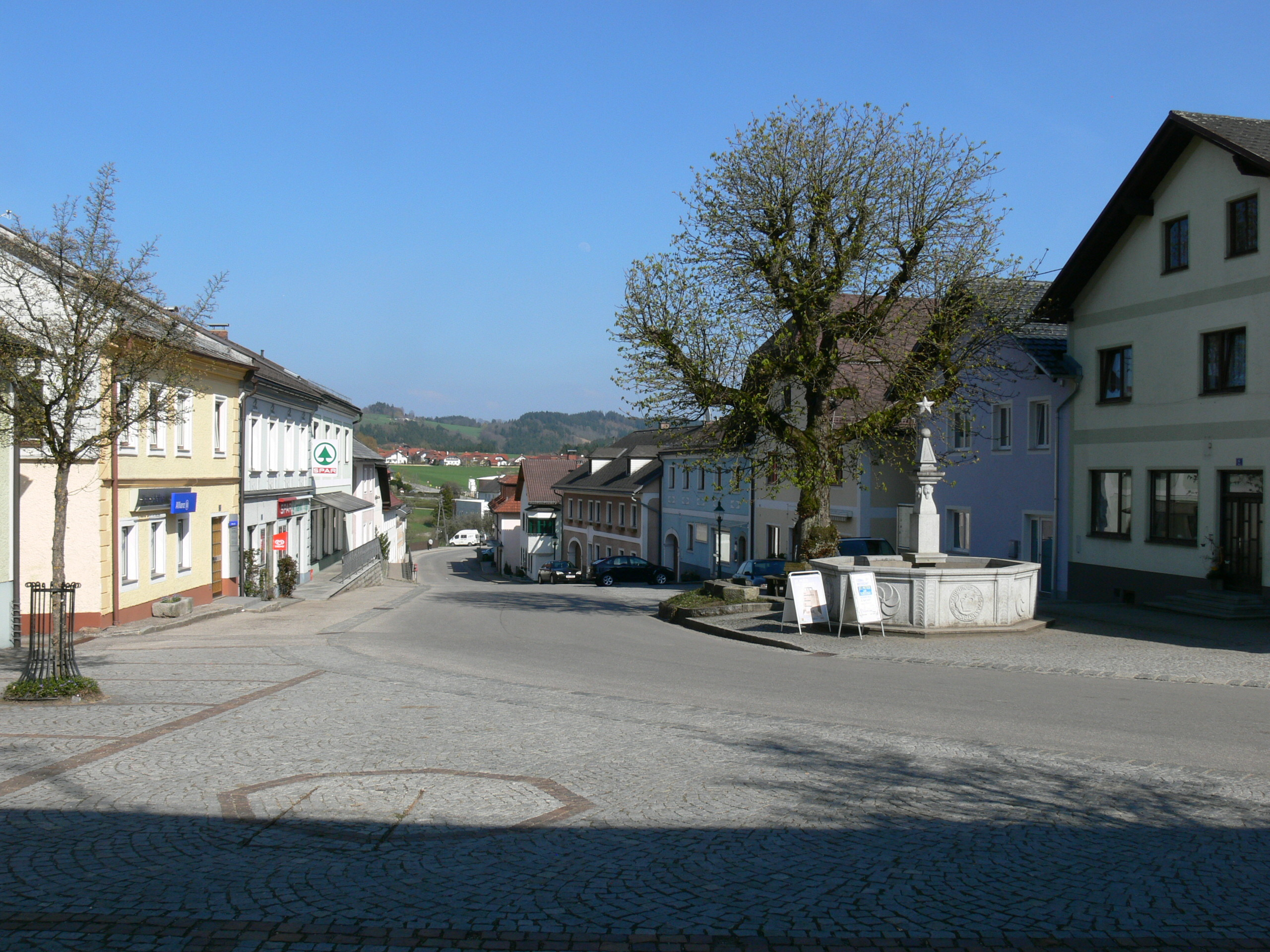

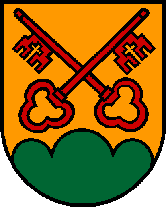
- Coat of arms

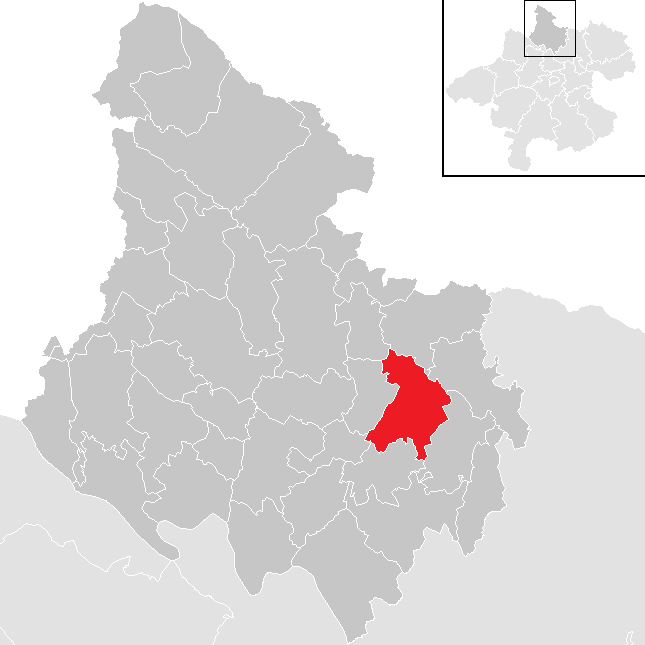
- Location in the district

- Location within Austria
- Coordinates: 48°30′10″N 14°05′12″E
- Country: Austria
- State: Upper Austria
- District: Rohrbach

Government
  - Mayor: Engelbert Pichler (ÖVP)

Area
  - Total: 23.35 km^{2} (9.02 sq mi)
- Elevation: 668 m (2,192 ft)

Population (2018-01-01)
  - Total: 1,770
  - Density: 75.8/km^{2} (196/sq mi)
- Time zone: UTC+1 (CET)
  - Summer (DST): UTC+2 (CEST)
- Postal code: 4171
- Area code: 07282
- Vehicle registration: RO
- Website: www.st-peter-wimberg.ooe.gv.at

Sankt Peter am Wimberg is a municipality in the district of Rohrbach in the Austrian state of Upper Austria. It is located 173 km from Austria's capital city, Vienna. The municipality also observes Daylight saving time (DST).

== Geography ==
Sankt Peter am Wimberg lies in the upper Mühlviertel. About 28 percent of the municipality is forest, and 66 percent is farmland.
