= Peilstein im Mühlviertel =

- Municipality
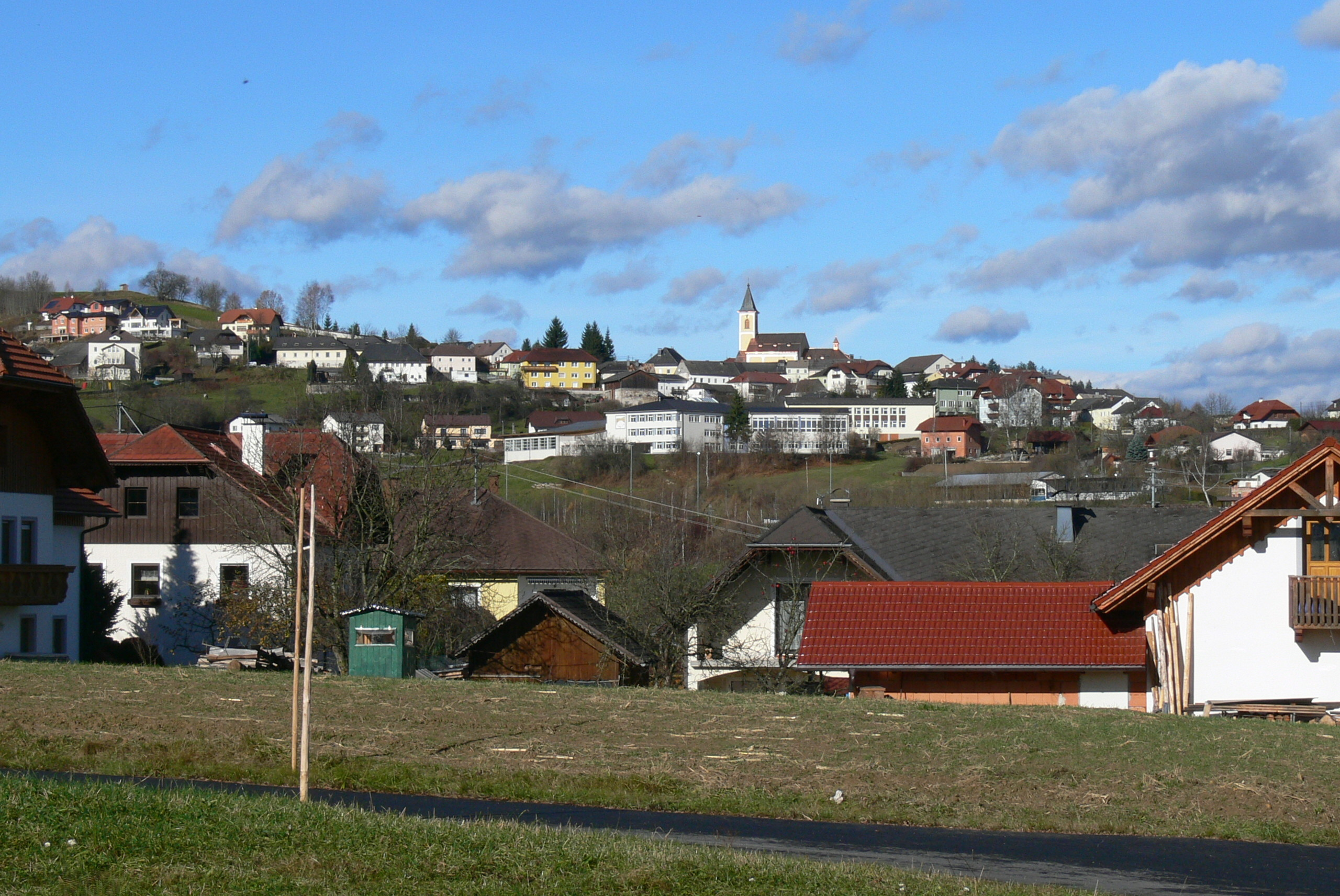

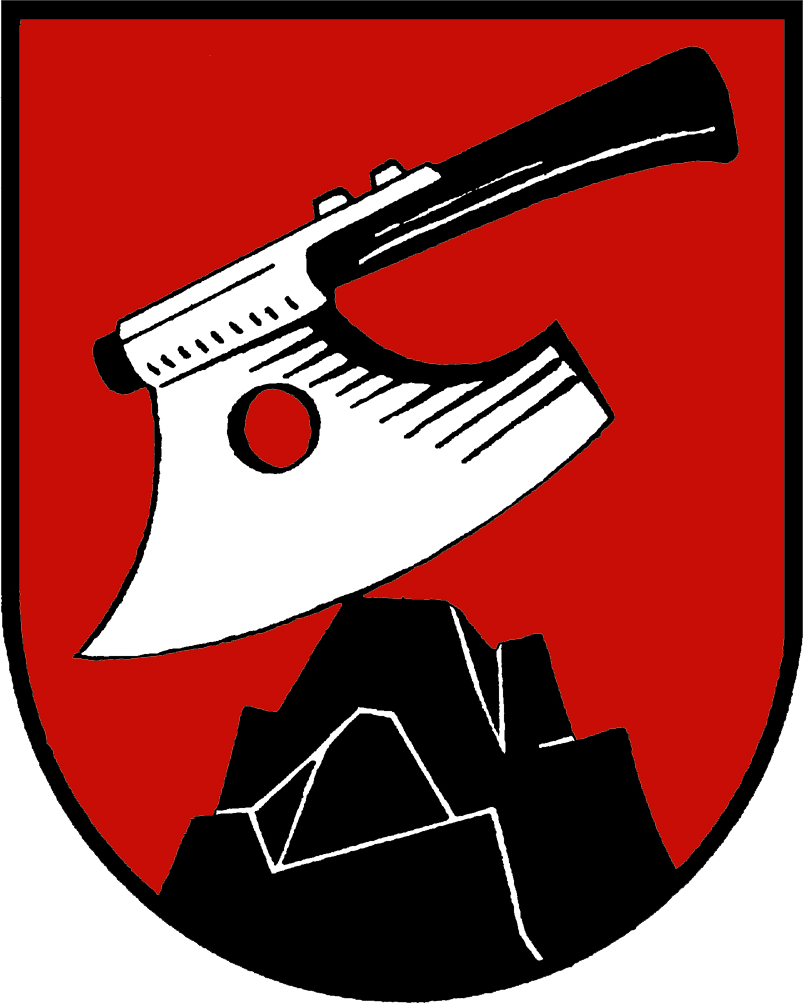
- Coat of arms

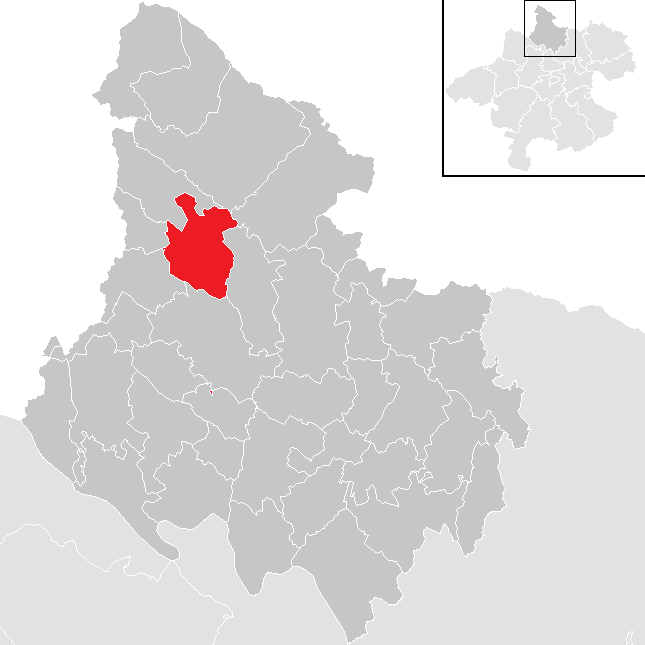
- Location in the district

- Location within Austria
- Coordinates: 48°37′06″N 13°53′41″E
- Country: Austria
- State: Upper Austria
- District: Rohrbach

Government
  - Mayor: Franz Lindinger (ÖVP)

Area
  - Total: 23.29 km^{2} (8.99 sq mi)
- Elevation: 584 m (1,916 ft)

Population (2018-01-01)
  - Total: 1,541
  - Density: 66.17/km^{2} (171.4/sq mi)
- Time zone: UTC+1 (CET)
  - Summer (DST): UTC+2 (CEST)
- Postal code: 4153
- Area code: 07287
- Vehicle registration: RO
- Website: www.peilstein.at

Peilstein im Mühlviertel is a municipality in the district of Rohrbach in the Austrian state of Upper Austria.

== Population ==
Historical population
Year	Pop.	±%
1925	1,741	—
1948	1,766	+1.4%
1951	1,604	−9.2%
1961	1,654	+3.1%
1971	1,638	−1.0%
1981	1,656	+1.1%
1991	1,672	+1.0%
2001	1,674	+0.1%
2010	1,595	−4.7%
2017	1,542	−3.3%
