= Hörbich =

- Municipality
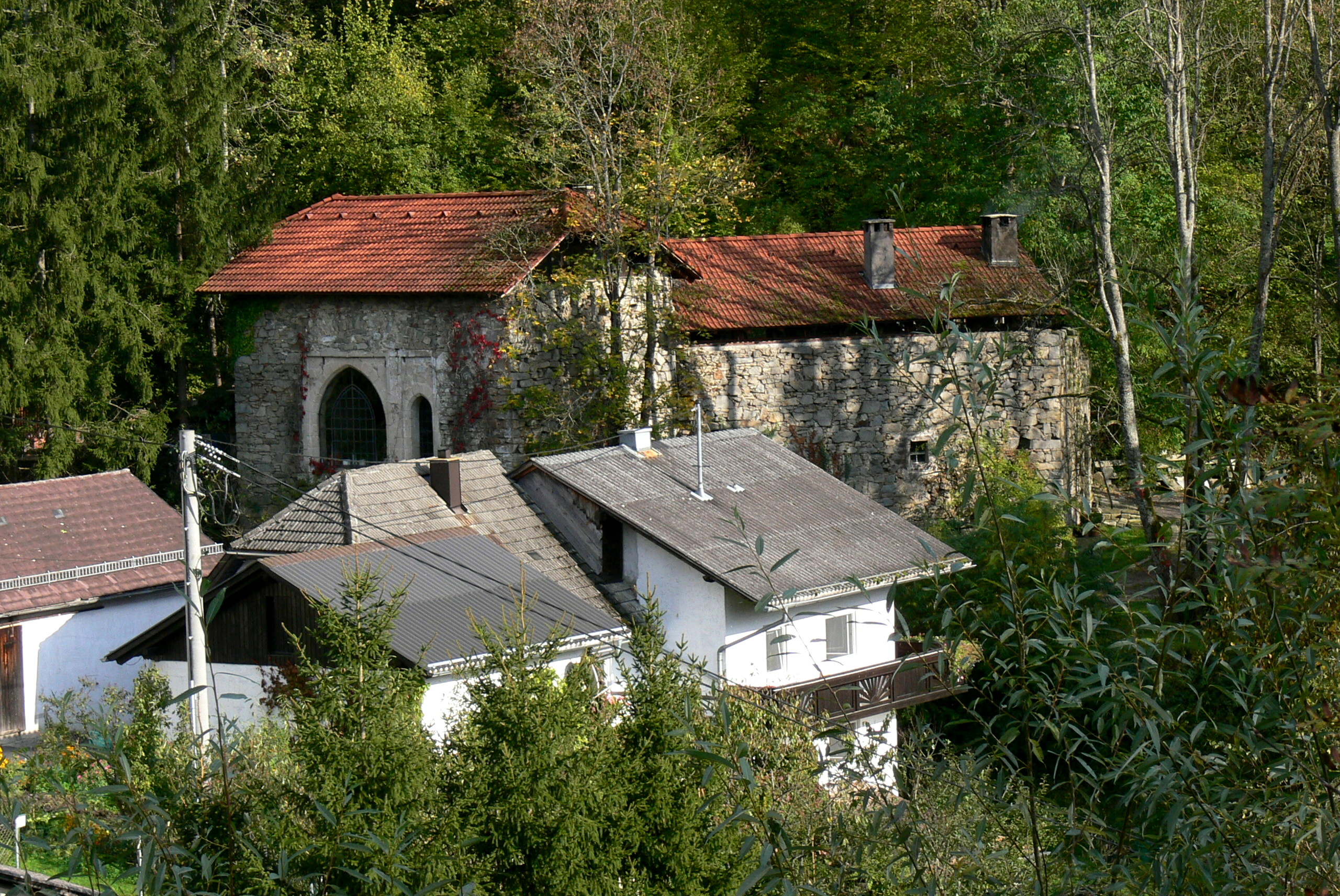
- Tannberg castle

- Coat of arms

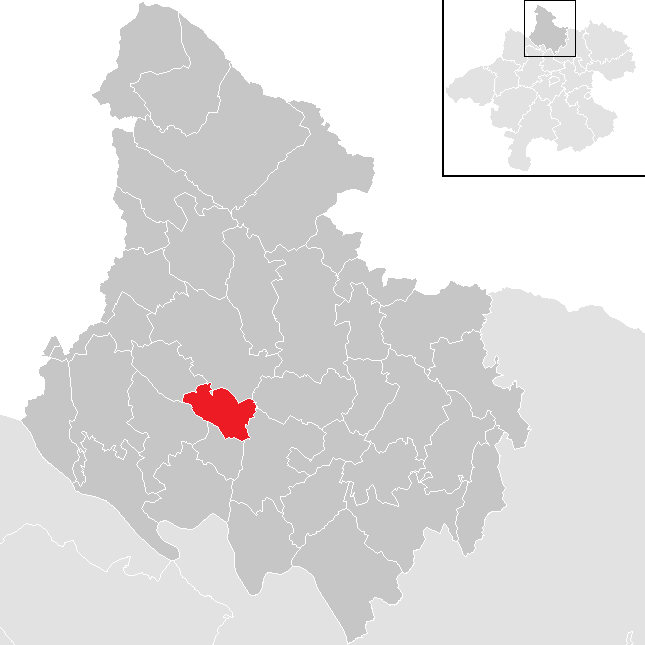
- Location in the district

- Location within Austria
- Coordinates: 48°31′06″N 13°54′54″E
- Country: Austria
- State: Upper Austria
- District: Rohrbach

Government
  - Mayor: Johann Ecker (ÖVP)

Area
  - Total: 11.21 km^{2} (4.33 sq mi)
- Elevation: 570 m (1,870 ft)

Population (2018-01-01)
  - Total: 420
  - Density: 37/km^{2} (97/sq mi)
- Time zone: UTC+1 (CET)
  - Summer (DST): UTC+2 (CEST)
- Postal code: 4132
- Area code: 07286
- Vehicle registration: RO

Hörbich is a municipality in the district of Rohrbach in the Austrian state of Upper Austria.

== Population ==
Historical population
Year	Pop.	±%
1869	546	—
1880	564	+3.3%
1890	548	−2.8%
1900	513	−6.4%
1910	483	−5.8%
1923	482	−0.2%
1934	471	−2.3%
1939	448	−4.9%
1951	454	+1.3%
1961	431	−5.1%
1971	473	+9.7%
1981	450	−4.9%
1991	428	−4.9%
2001	400	−6.5%
2011	416	+4.0%
2017	429	+3.1%
