= Sankt Veit im Mühlkreis =

- Municipality
- Coat of arms

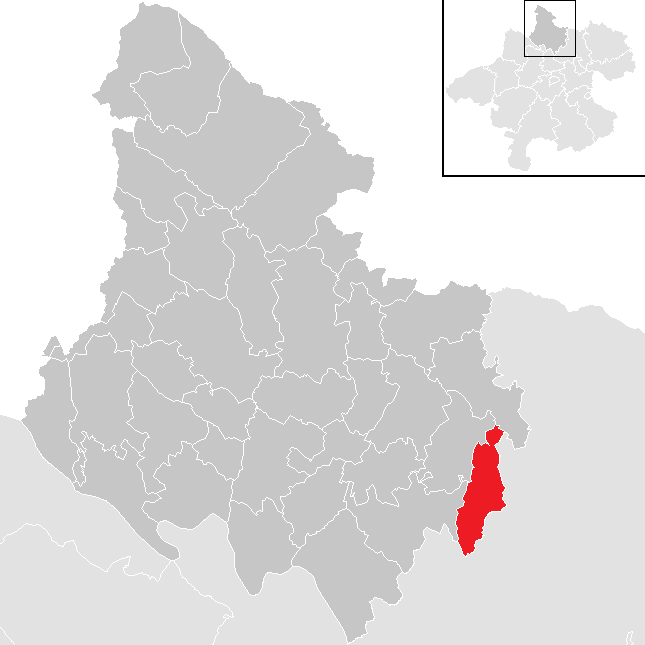
- Location in the district

- Location within Austria
- Coordinates: 48°28′16″N 14°09′53″E
- Country: Austria
- State: Upper Austria
- District: Rohrbach

Government
  - Mayor: Johann Gattringer (ÖVP)

Area
  - Total: 16.24 km^{2} (6.27 sq mi)
- Elevation: 686 m (2,251 ft)

Population (2018-01-01)
  - Total: 1,206
  - Density: 74.26/km^{2} (192.3/sq mi)
- Time zone: UTC+1 (CET)
  - Summer (DST): UTC+2 (CEST)
- Postal code: 4173
- Area code: 07217
- Vehicle registration: RO
- Website: www.st-veit.ooe.gv.at

Sankt Veit im Mühlkreis is a municipality in the district of Rohrbach in the Austrian state of Upper Austria.

== Geography ==
Sankt Veit im Mühlkreis lies in the far east of the district of Rohrbach in the upper Mühlviertel. About 27 percent of the municipality is forest, and 67 percent is farmland.
