= Neustift im Mühlkreis =

- Municipality
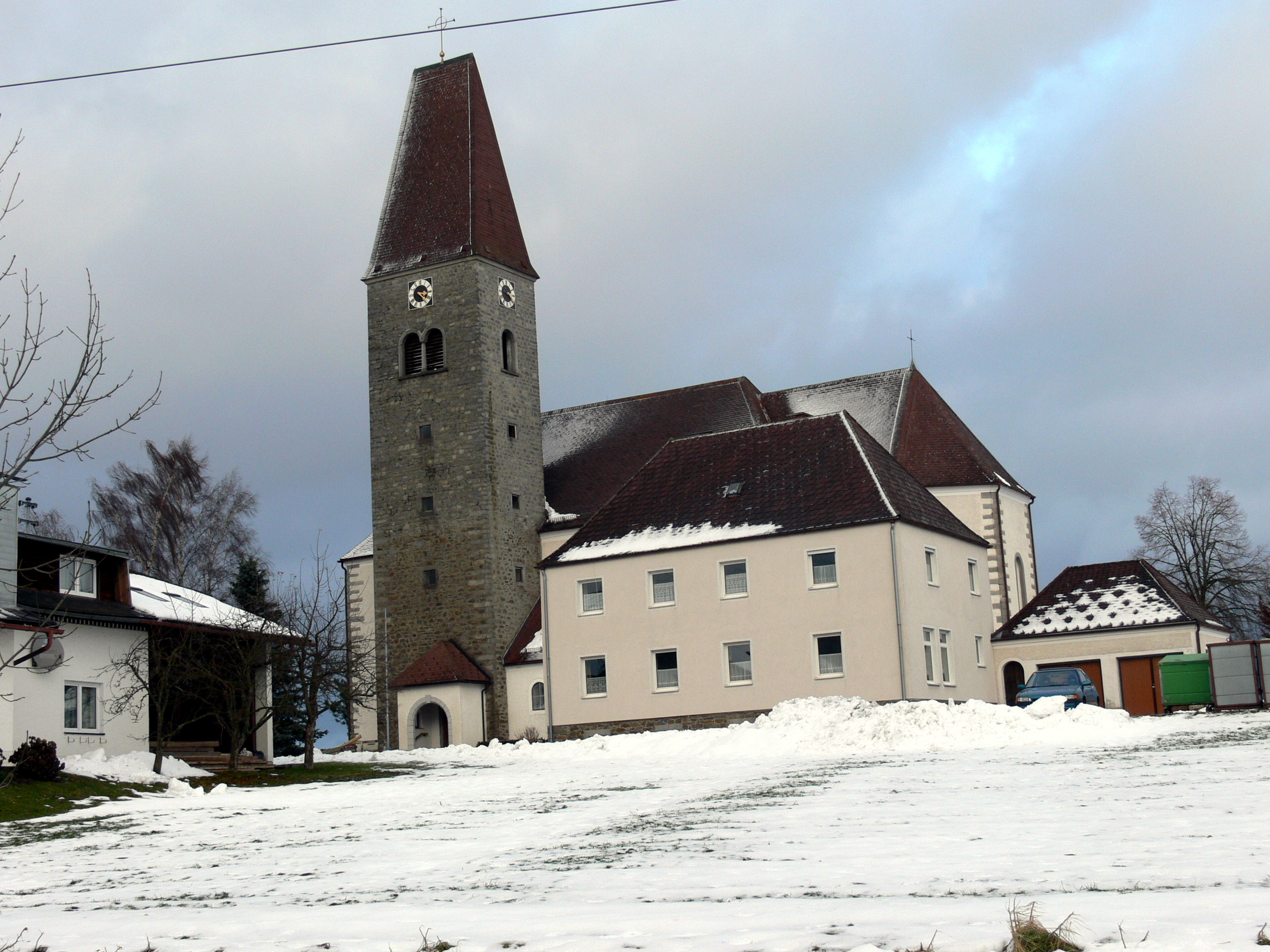

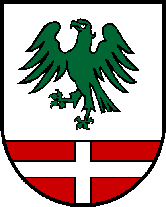
- Coat of arms

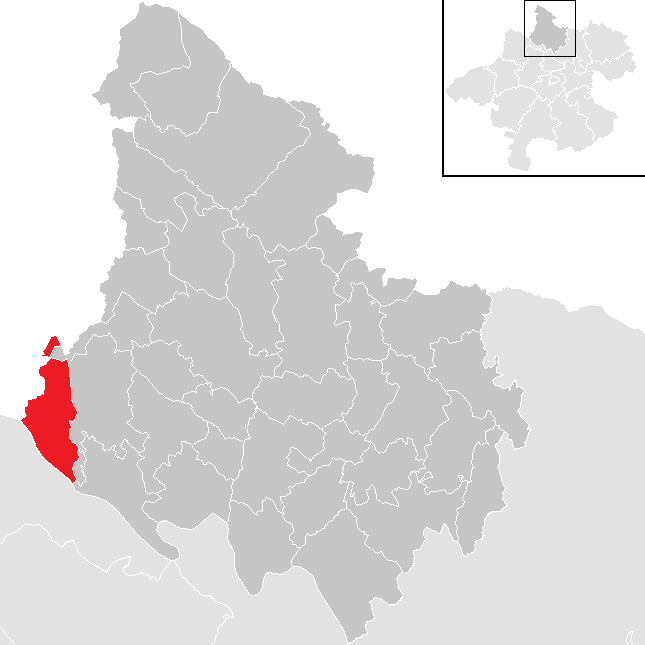
- Location in the district

- Location within Austria
- Coordinates: 48°31′44″N 13°45′22″E
- Country: Austria
- State: Upper Austria
- District: Rohrbach

Government
  - Mayor: Franz Rauscher (ÖVP)

Area
  - Total: 20.42 km^{2} (7.88 sq mi)
- Elevation: 591 m (1,939 ft)

Population (2016-01-01)
  - Total: 1,461
  - Density: 71.55/km^{2} (185.3/sq mi)
- Time zone: UTC+1 (CET)
  - Summer (DST): UTC+2 (CEST)
- Postal code: 4143
- Area code: 07284
- Vehicle registration: RO
- Website: www.neustift-muehlviertel.at

Neustift im Mühlkreis is a municipality in the district of Rohrbach in the Austrian state of Upper Austria.

== Population ==
Historical population
Year	Pop.	±%
1869	1,259	—
1880	1,282	+1.8%
1890	1,260	−1.7%
1900	1,279	+1.5%
1910	1,217	−4.8%
1923	1,141	−6.2%
1934	1,180	+3.4%
1939	1,163	−1.4%
1951	1,231	+5.8%
1961	1,265	+2.8%
1971	1,349	+6.6%
1981	1,405	+4.2%
1991	1,473	+4.8%
2001	1,493	+1.4%
2011	1,453	−2.7%
2017	1,464	+0.8%
