= Lembach im Mühlkreis =

- Municipality
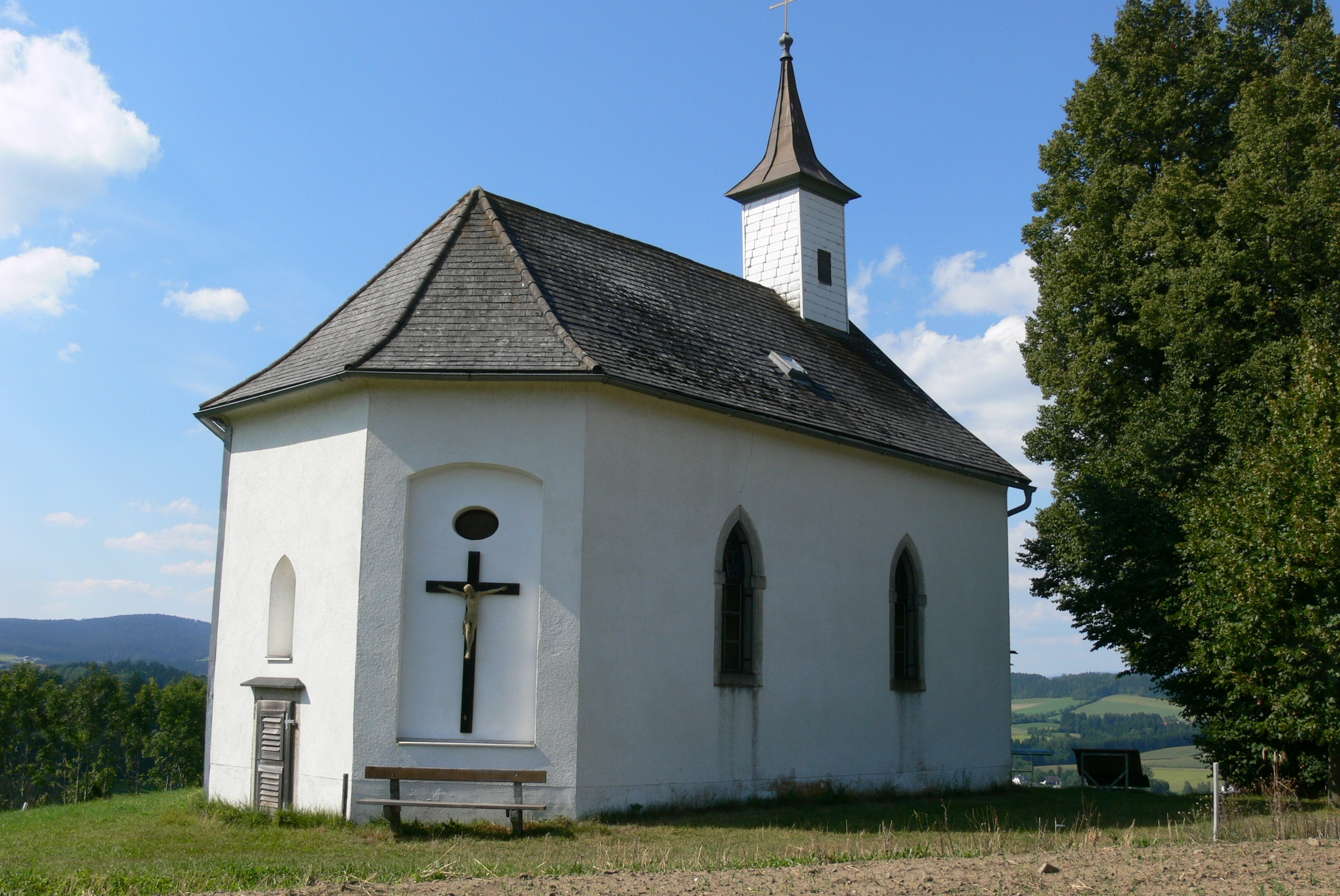

- Coat of arms

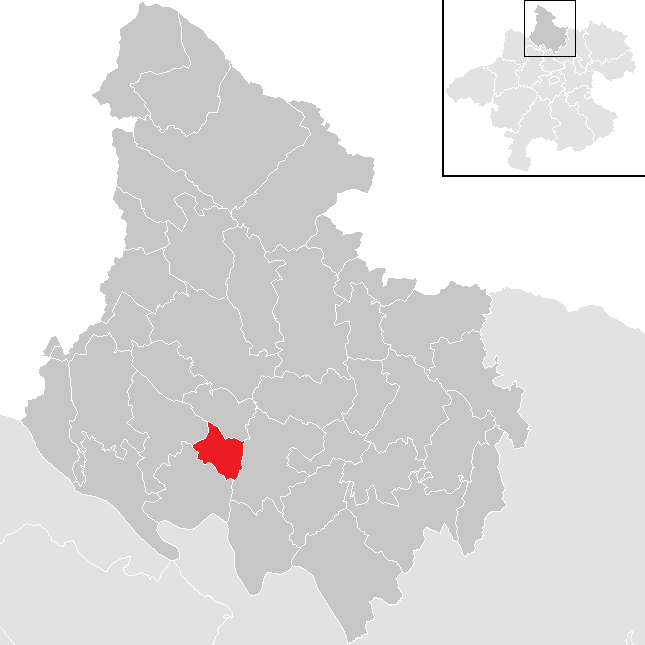
- Location in the district

- Location within Austria
- Coordinates: 48°29′44″N 13°53′44″E
- Country: Austria
- State: Upper Austria
- District: Rohrbach

Government
  - Mayor: Nicole Leitenmüller (ÖVP)

Area
  - Total: 7.98 km^{2} (3.08 sq mi)
- Elevation: 552 m (1,811 ft)

Population (2018-01-01)
  - Total: 1,530
  - Density: 192/km^{2} (497/sq mi)
- Time zone: UTC+1 (CET)
  - Summer (DST): UTC+2 (CEST)
- Postal code: 4132
- Area code: 07286
- Vehicle registration: RO
- Website: www.gemeinde-lembach.at

Lembach im Mühlkreis is a municipality in the district of Rohrbach in the Austrian state of Upper Austria.

== Population ==
Historical population
Year	Pop.	±%
1869	877	—
1880	1,008	+14.9%
1890	990	−1.8%
1900	961	−2.9%
1910	1,060	+10.3%
1923	971	−8.4%
1934	1,008	+3.8%
1939	995	−1.3%
1951	1,094	+9.9%
1961	1,159	+5.9%
1971	1,322	+14.1%
1981	1,330	+0.6%
1991	1,532	+15.2%
2001	1,533	+0.1%
2011	1,558	+1.6%
2017	1,529	−1.9%
