= Ahorn, Austria =

Ahorn
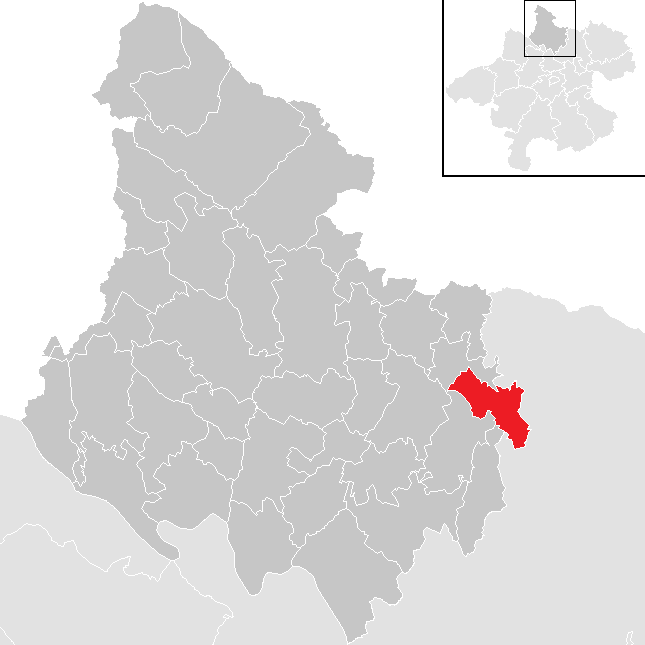
- Location in the district

- Location within Austria
- Coordinates: 48°31′26″N 14°10′30″E
- Country: Austria
- State: Upper Austria
- District: Rohrbach

Area
  - Total: 13.03 km^{2} (5.03 sq mi)
- Elevation: 828 m (2,717 ft)

Population (2018-01-01)
  - Total: 505
  - Density: 38.8/km^{2} (100/sq mi)
- Time zone: UTC+1 (CET)
  - Summer (DST): UTC+2 (CEST)
- Postal code: 4184
- Area code: 07216
- Vehicle registration: RO

Ahorn was a municipality in the district of Rohrbach in the Austrian state of Upper Austria.

== Population ==
Historical population
Year	Pop.	±%
1869	805	—
1880	787	−2.2%
1890	691	−12.2%
1900	650	−5.9%
1910	633	−2.6%
1923	593	−6.3%
1934	590	−0.5%
1939	565	−4.2%
1951	525	−7.1%
1961	501	−4.6%
1971	503	+0.4%
1981	484	−3.8%
1991	493	+1.9%
2001	492	−0.2%
2011	492	+0.0%
2017	506	+2.8%
