= Atzesberg =

- Municipality
- Coat of arms

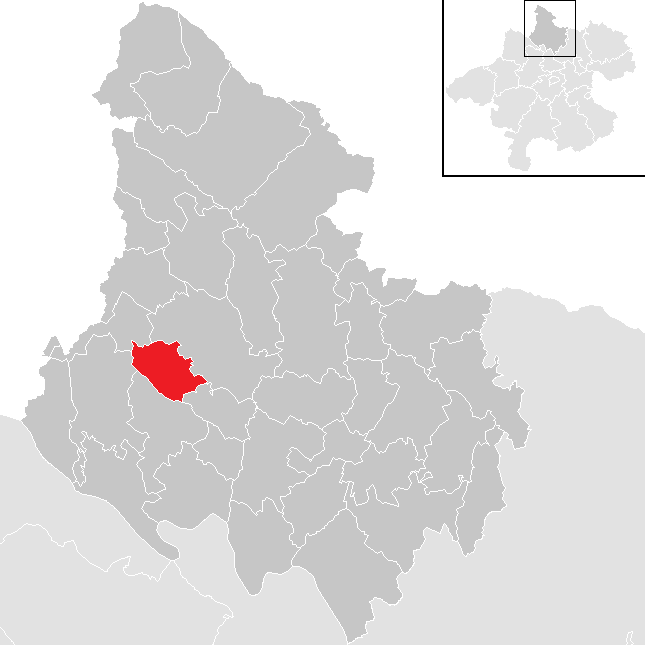
- Location in the district

- Location within Austria
- Coordinates: 48°32′26″N 13°52′17″E
- Country: Austria
- State: Upper Austria
- District: Rohrbach

Government
  - Mayor: Josef Scharinger (ÖVP)

Area
  - Total: 12.72 km^{2} (4.91 sq mi)
- Elevation: 610 m (2,000 ft)

Population (2018-01-01)
  - Total: 446
  - Density: 35.1/km^{2} (90.8/sq mi)
- Time zone: UTC+1 (CET)
  - Summer (DST): UTC+2 (CEST)
- Postal code: 4152
- Area code: 0 72 83
- Vehicle registration: RO

Atzesberg is a municipality in the district of Rohrbach in the Austrian state of Upper Austria.

== Population ==
Historical population
Year	Pop.	±%
1869	617	—
1880	616	−0.2%
1890	560	−9.1%
1900	527	−5.9%
1910	486	−7.8%
1923	513	+5.6%
1934	532	+3.7%
1939	515	−3.2%
1951	482	−6.4%
1961	561	+16.4%
1971	541	−3.6%
1981	503	−7.0%
1991	536	+6.6%
2001	521	−2.8%
2011	453	−13.1%
2017	446	−1.5%
