= Sankt Ulrich im Mühlkreis =

- Municipality
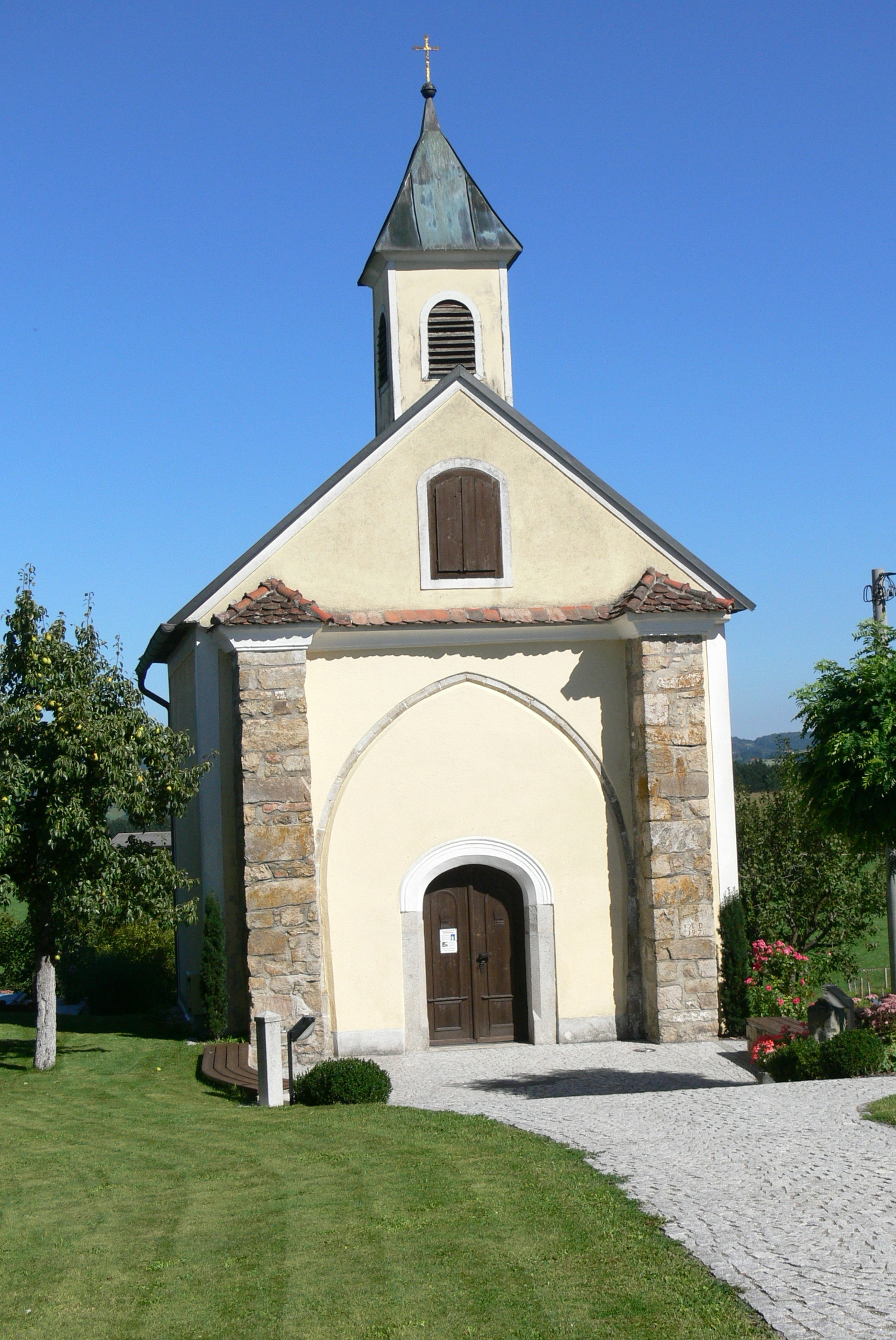

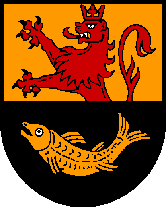
- Coat of arms

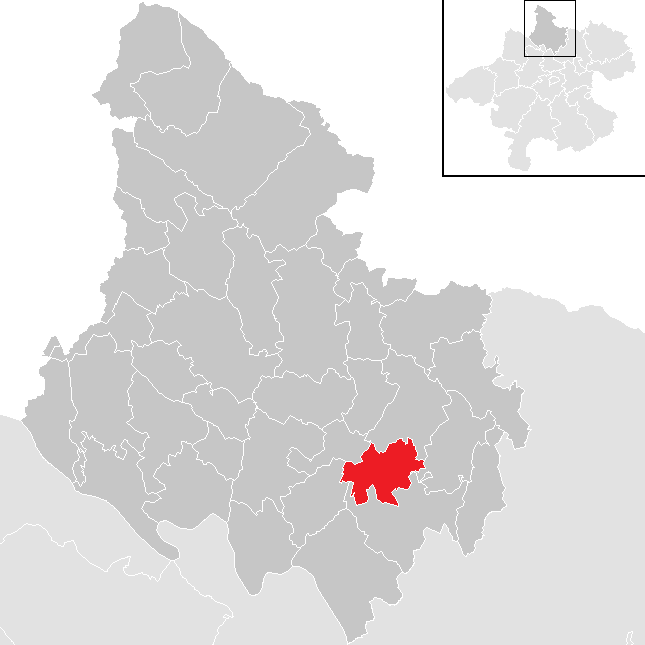
- Location in the district

- Location within Austria
- Coordinates: 48°28′23″N 14°02′54″E
- Country: Austria
- State: Upper Austria
- District: Rohrbach

Government
  - Mayor: Alfred Allerstorfer (ÖVP)

Area
  - Total: 15.36 km^{2} (5.93 sq mi)
- Elevation: 622 m (2,041 ft)

Population (2018-01-01)
  - Total: 633
  - Density: 41.2/km^{2} (107/sq mi)
- Time zone: UTC+1 (CET)
  - Summer (DST): UTC+2 (CEST)
- Postal code: 4120
- Area code: 07282
- Vehicle registration: RO
- Website: www.st-ulrich.ooe.gv.at

Sankt Ulrich im Mühlkreis is a municipality in the district of Rohrbach in the Austrian state of Upper Austria.

== Geography ==
Sankt Ulrich im Mühlkreis lies in the upper Mühlviertel. About 22 percent of the municipality is forest, and 74 percent is farmland.
