= Sankt Martin im Mühlkreis =

- Municipality
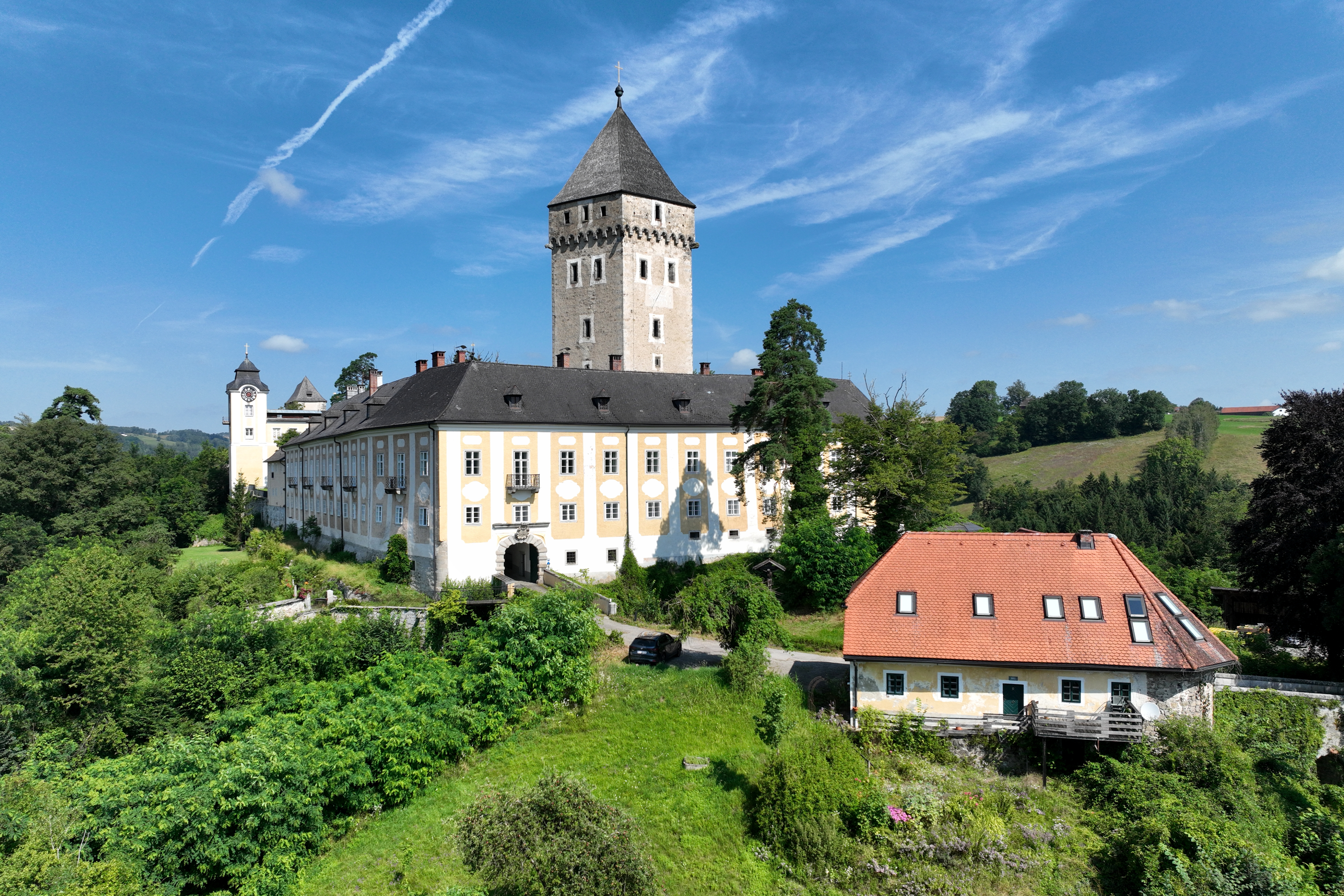
- Neuhaus castle

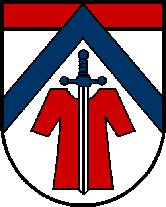
- Coat of arms

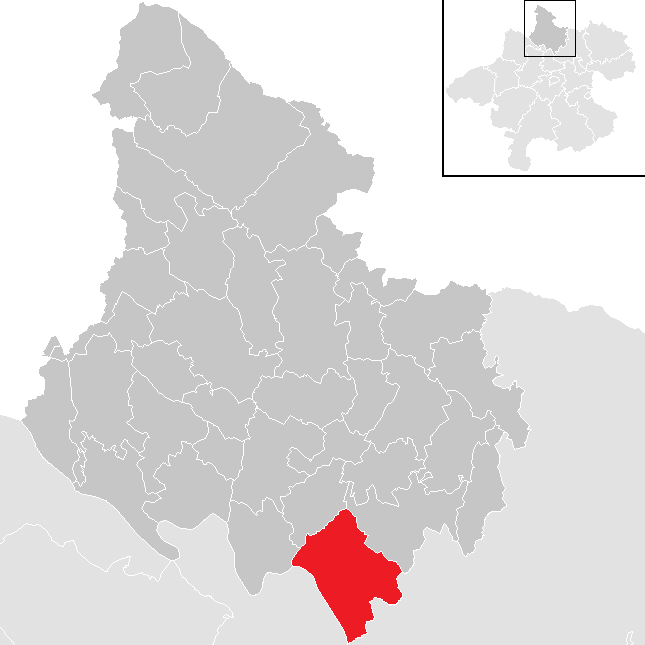
- Location in the district

- Location within Austria
- Coordinates: 48°25′00″N 14°02′21″E
- Country: Austria
- State: Upper Austria
- District: Rohrbach

Government
  - Mayor: Wolfgang Schirz (ÖVP)

Area
  - Total: 34.85 km^{2} (13.46 sq mi)
- Elevation: 549 m (1,801 ft)

Population (2018-01-01)
  - Total: 3,757
  - Density: 107.8/km^{2} (279.2/sq mi)
- Time zone: UTC+1 (CET)
  - Summer (DST): UTC+2 (CEST)
- Postal code: 4113
- Area code: 07232
- Vehicle registration: RO
- Website: www.sankt-martin.at

Sankt Martin im Mühlkreis is a municipality in the district of Rohrbach in the Austrian state of Upper Austria.

== Population ==
Historical population
Year	Pop.	±%
1869	2,068	—
1880	2,109	+2.0%
1890	2,197	+4.2%
1900	2,201	+0.2%
1910	2,314	+5.1%
1923	2,251	−2.7%
1934	2,301	+2.2%
1939	2,198	−4.5%
1951	2,094	−4.7%
1961	2,197	+4.9%
1971	2,359	+7.4%
1981	2,725	+15.5%
1991	3,239	+18.9%
2001	3,588	+10.8%
2011	3,612	+0.7%
2017	3,776	+4.5%
