= Lichtenau im Mühlkreis =

- Municipality
- Coat of arms

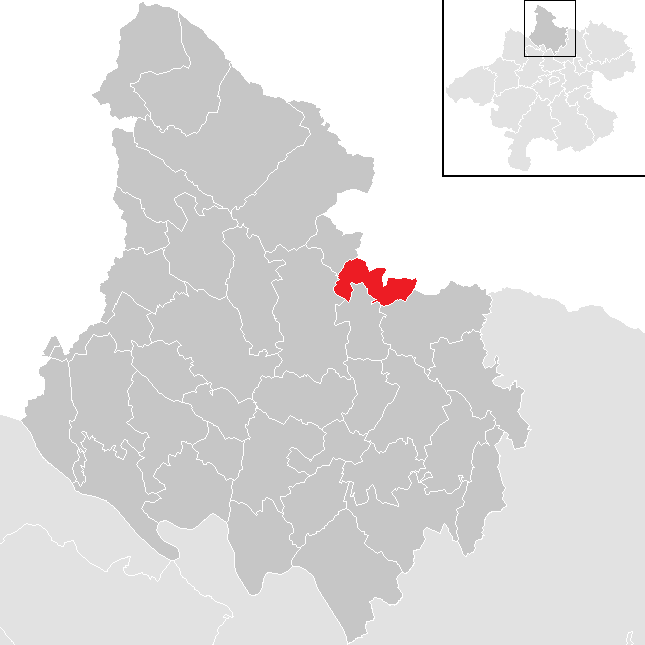
- Location in the district

- Location within Austria
- Coordinates: 48°35′31″N 14°02′07″E
- Country: Austria
- State: Upper Austria
- District: Rohrbach

Government
  - Mayor: Albrecht Neidhart (ÖVP)

Area
  - Total: 9.92 km^{2} (3.83 sq mi)
- Elevation: 553 m (1,814 ft)

Population (2018-01-01)
  - Total: 498
  - Density: 50.2/km^{2} (130/sq mi)
- Time zone: UTC+1 (CET)
  - Summer (DST): UTC+2 (CEST)
- Postal code: 4170
- Area code: 07289
- Vehicle registration: RO

Lichtenau im Mühlkreis is a municipality in the district of Rohrbach in the Austrian state of Upper Austria.

== Geography ==
Lichtenau lies in the Mühlviertel. About 33 percent of the municipality is forest, and 62 percent is farmland.
