= Altenfelden =

- Municipality
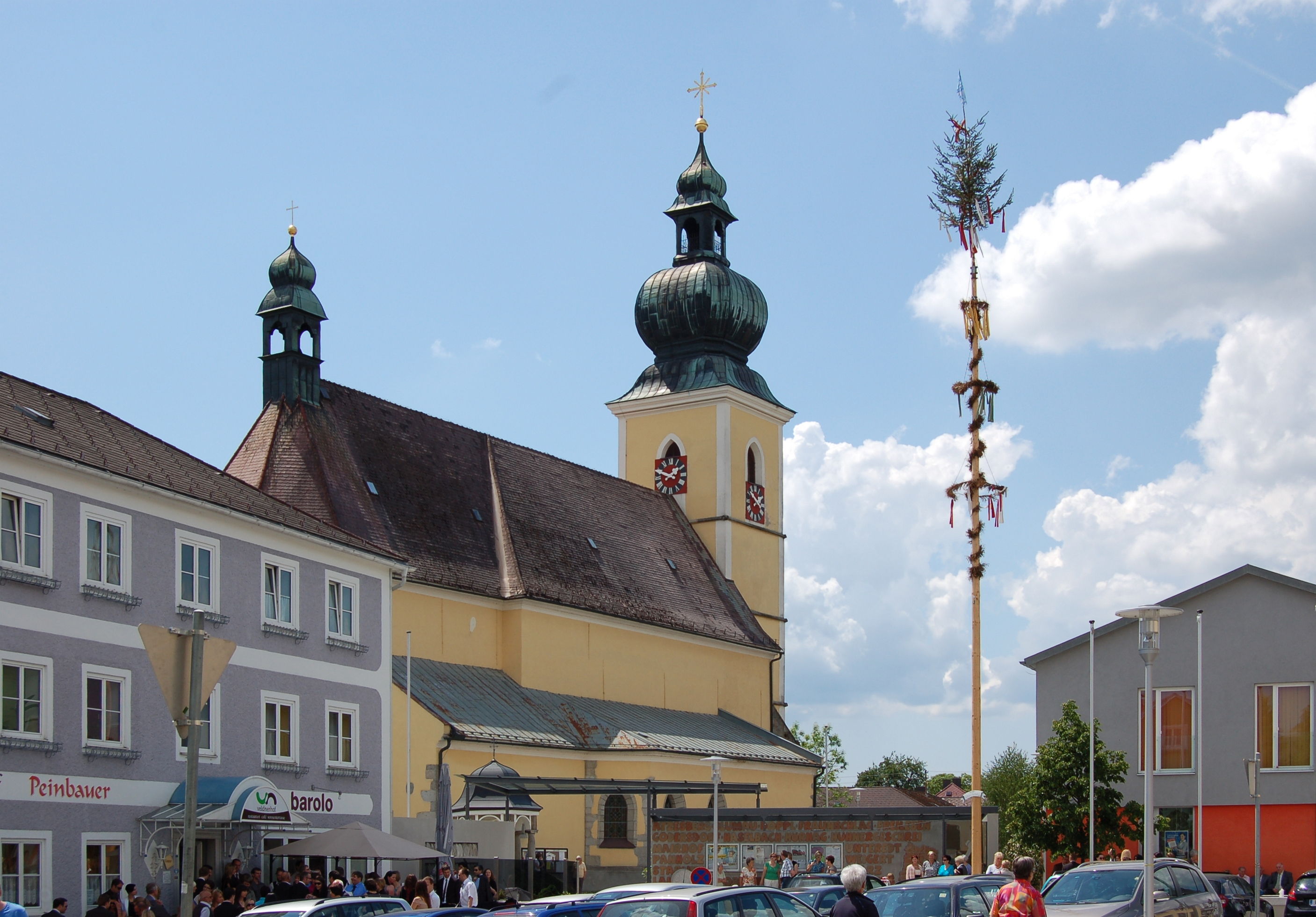

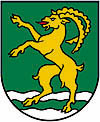
- Coat of arms

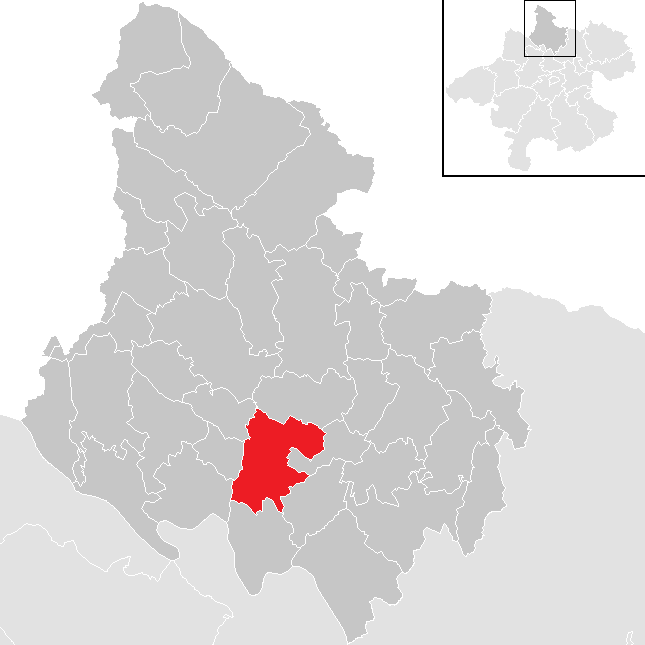
- Location in the district

- Location within Austria
- Coordinates: 48°29′10″N 13°58′08″E
- Country: Austria
- State: Upper Austria
- District: Rohrbach

Government
  - Mayor: Klaus Gattringer (ÖVP)

Area
  - Total: 26.36 km^{2} (10.18 sq mi)
- Elevation: 598 m (1,962 ft)

Population (2018-01-01)
  - Total: 2,219
  - Density: 84.18/km^{2} (218.0/sq mi)
- Time zone: UTC+1 (CET)
  - Summer (DST): UTC+2 (CEST)
- Postal code: 4121
- Area code: 07282
- Vehicle registration: RO
- Website: www.altenfelden.at

Altenfelden is a municipality in the district of Rohrbach in the Austrian state of Upper Austria.

== Population ==
Historical population
Year	Pop.	±%
1869	1,706	—
1880	1,909	+11.9%
1890	1,925	+0.8%
1900	2,004	+4.1%
1910	1,959	−2.2%
1923	1,950	−0.5%
1934	1,837	−5.8%
1939	1,778	−3.2%
1951	1,787	+0.5%
1961	1,800	+0.7%
1971	1,962	+9.0%
1981	2,021	+3.0%
1991	2,103	+4.1%
2001	2,233	+6.2%
2011	2,142	−4.1%
2017	2,208	+3.1%
