= Kleinzell im Mühlkreis =

- Municipality
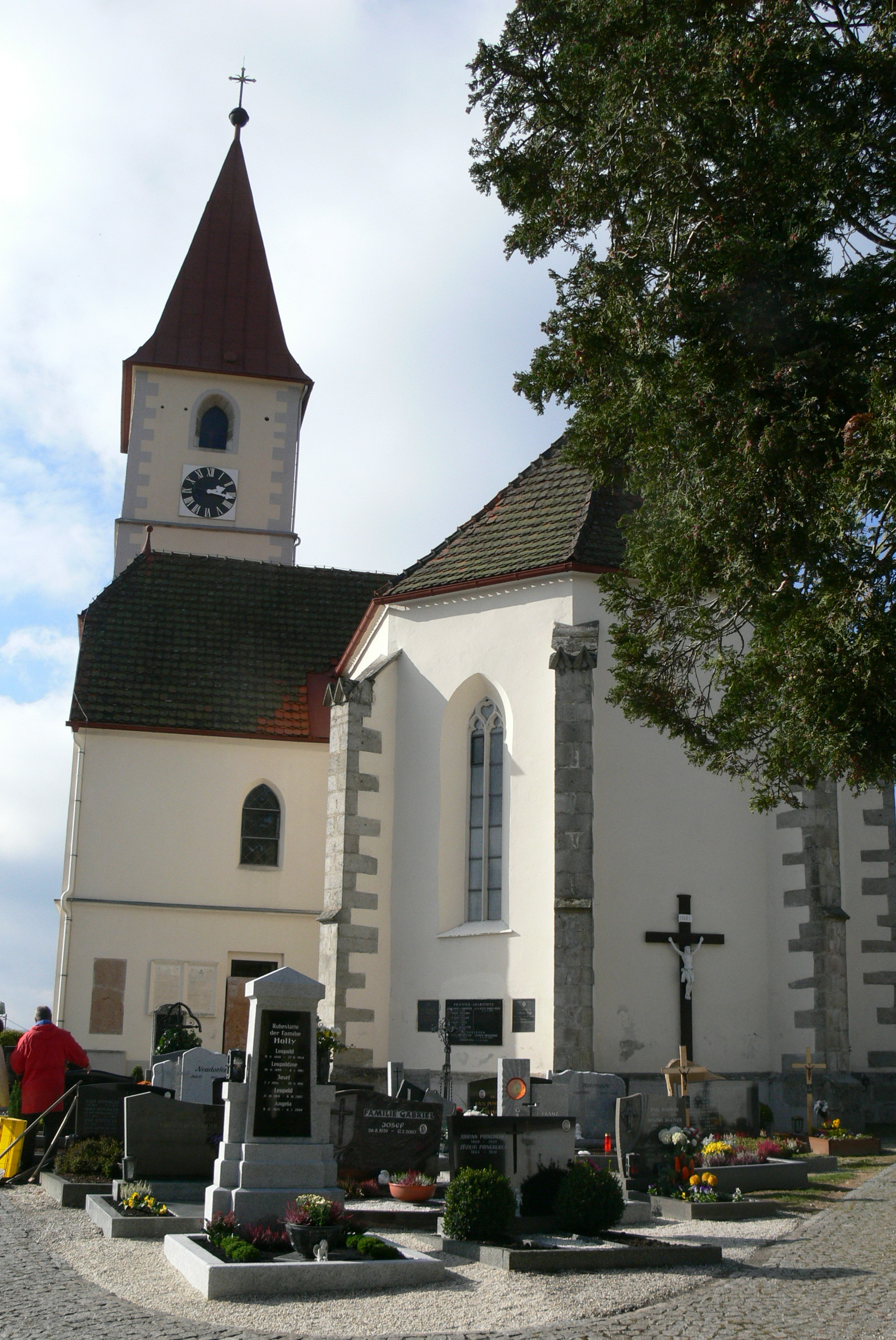

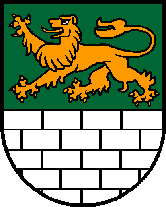
- Coat of arms

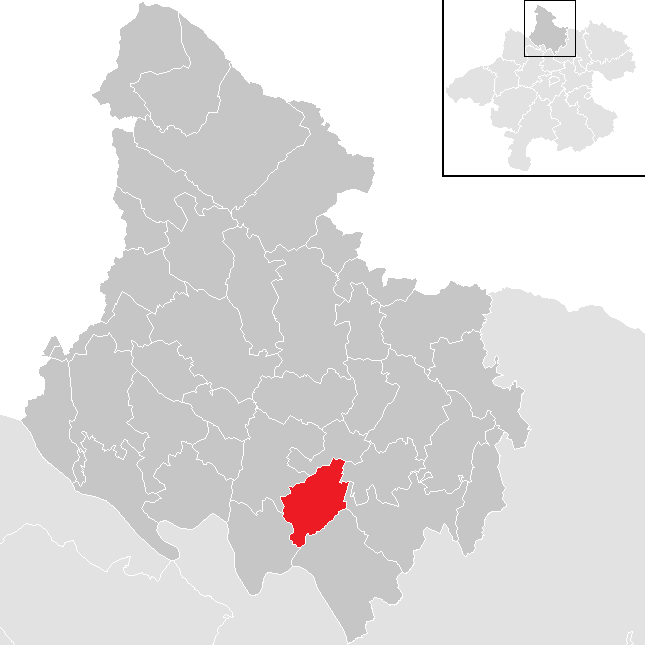
- Location in the district

- Location within Austria
- Coordinates: 48°27′24″N 13°59′45″E
- Country: Austria
- State: Upper Austria
- District: Rohrbach

Government
  - Mayor: Klaus Falkinger (ÖVP)

Area
  - Total: 16.15 km^{2} (6.24 sq mi)
- Elevation: 548 m (1,798 ft)

Population (2018-01-01)
  - Total: 1,546
  - Density: 95.73/km^{2} (247.9/sq mi)
- Time zone: UTC+1 (CET)
  - Summer (DST): UTC+2 (CEST)
- Postal code: 4115
- Area code: 07282
- Vehicle registration: RO
- Website: www.kleinzell.at

Kleinzell im Mühlkreis is a municipality in the district of Rohrbach in the Austrian state of Upper Austria.

== Population ==
Historical population
Year	Pop.	±%
1869	1,150	—
1880	1,151	+0.1%
1890	1,140	−1.0%
1900	1,203	+5.5%
1910	1,188	−1.2%
1923	1,175	−1.1%
1934	1,107	−5.8%
1939	1,068	−3.5%
1951	1,053	−1.4%
1961	1,277	+21.3%
1971	1,370	+7.3%
1981	1,391	+1.5%
1991	1,387	−0.3%
2001	1,392	+0.4%
2011	1,467	+5.4%
2015	1,555	+6.0%
