= Putzleinsdorf =

- Municipality
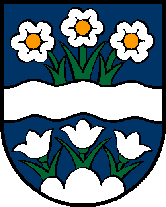
- Coat of arms

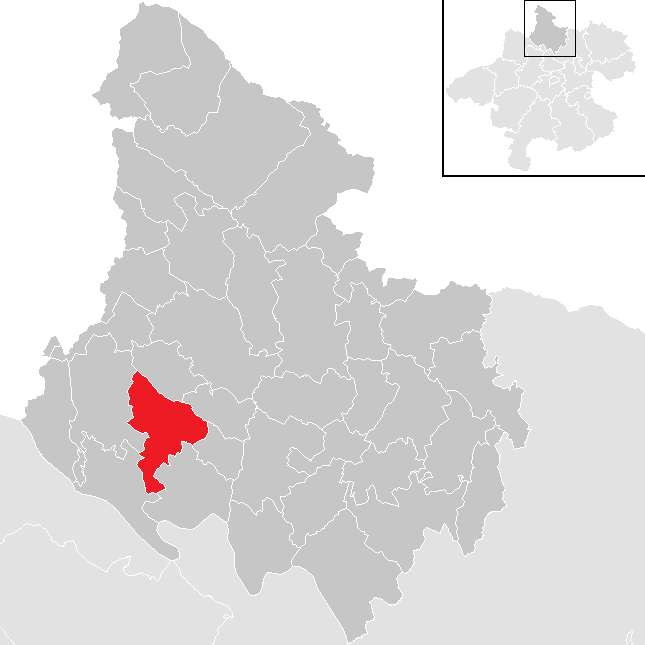
- Location in the district

- Location within Austria
- Coordinates: 48°31′06″N 13°52′28″E
- Country: Austria
- State: Upper Austria
- District: Rohrbach

Government
  - Mayor: Bernhard Fenk (ÖVP)

Area
  - Total: 22.13 km^{2} (8.54 sq mi)
- Elevation: 603 m (1,978 ft)

Population (2018-01-01)
  - Total: 1,553
  - Density: 70.18/km^{2} (181.8/sq mi)
- Time zone: UTC+1 (CET)
  - Summer (DST): UTC+2 (CEST)
- Postal code: 4134
- Area code: 07286
- Vehicle registration: RO
- Website: www.putzleinsdorf.at

Putzleinsdorf is a municipality in the district of Rohrbach in Upper Austria, Austria.
