= German Thaya =

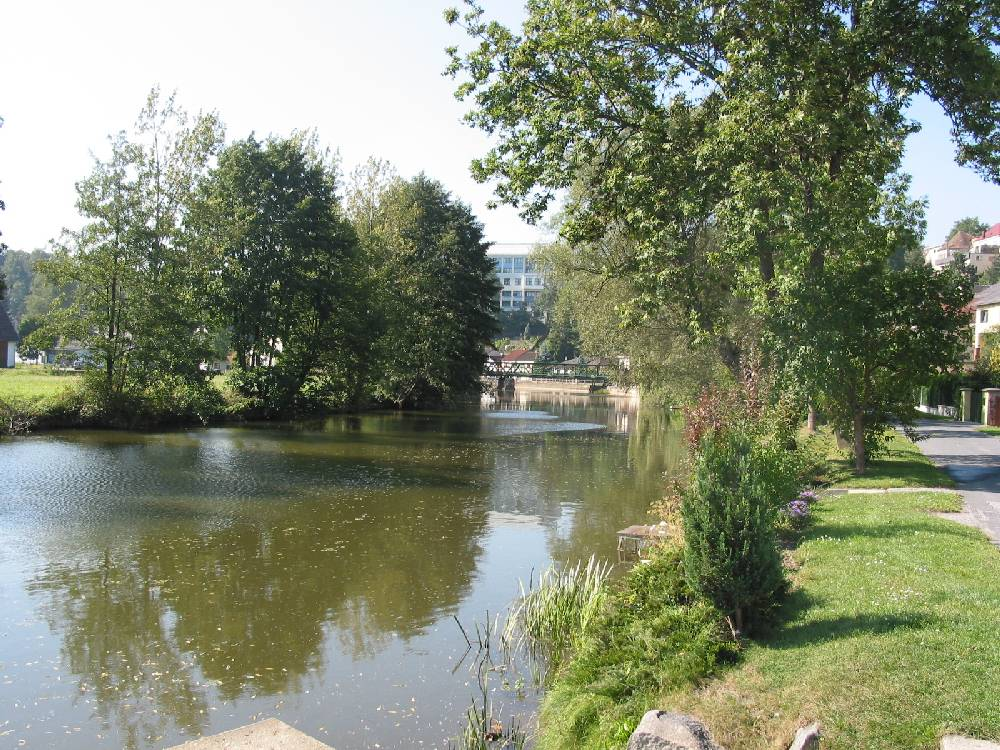
- German Thaya in Waidhofen

Location
- Country: Austria
- State: Lower Austria

Physical characteristics
- Source
  - location: near Schweiggers
  - elevation: 657.5 m (2,157 ft)
- Mouth
  - location: Raabs an der Thaya
  - coordinates: 48°50′52″N 15°29′25″E
  - elevation: 410 m (1,350 ft)
- Length: 75.8 km (47.1 mi)
- Basin size: 770 km^{2} (300 sq mi)
- Discharge
  - average: 4.4 m^{3}/s (160 cu ft/s)

Basin features
- Progression: Thaya→ Morava→ Danube→ Black Sea

The German Thaya or Austrian Thaya (German: Deutsche Thaya, Czech: Rakouská Dyje) is a river in Lower Austria. Its drainage basin is 770 km^{2} (300 sq mi).

Despite its name, no part of the river is in Germany. It originates southwest of Schweiggers at an elevation of 657.5 metres (2,157 ft). First, it flows in north-easterly direction to the village of Vitis, where it is joined by the left tributary Jaudlingbach. It flows further eastward to Schwarzenau and gradually turns to the north, zig-zagging through Waidhofen, Thaya, and Dobersberg. Then it turns to the east and southeast, flowing through Karlstein and Raabs, where it joins the Moravian Thaya.

From here the unified Thaya flows generally eastward into the Czech Republic.

Eduard Mörike's 1856 novella Mozart's Journey to Prague mentions the German Thaya, claiming that Mozart and his wife crossed it on 14 September 1787 (see Mozart in fiction).
