= Waidhofen =

Waidhofen may refer to the following places:

- Waidhofen an der Ybbs, a statutory city in Lower Austria, Austria
- Waidhofen an der Thaya, a town in Lower Austria, Austria
- Waidhofen an der Thaya-Land, a municipality in Lower Austria, Austria
- Waidhofen an der Thaya (district), a district in Lower Austria, Austria
- Waidhofen, Bavaria, a municipality in Bavaria, Germany
