= Holetschek =

Surname

Holetschek is a German-language surname, a Germanized version of the Czech surname Holeček. People with that surname include:

- Johann Holetschek (1846–1923), Austrian astronomer
  - Holetschek (crater), a lunar crater named after the astronomer
- Klaus Holetschek (born 1964), German politician
- Olaf Holetschek (1968), German former footballer
