= Slavonice =

- Town
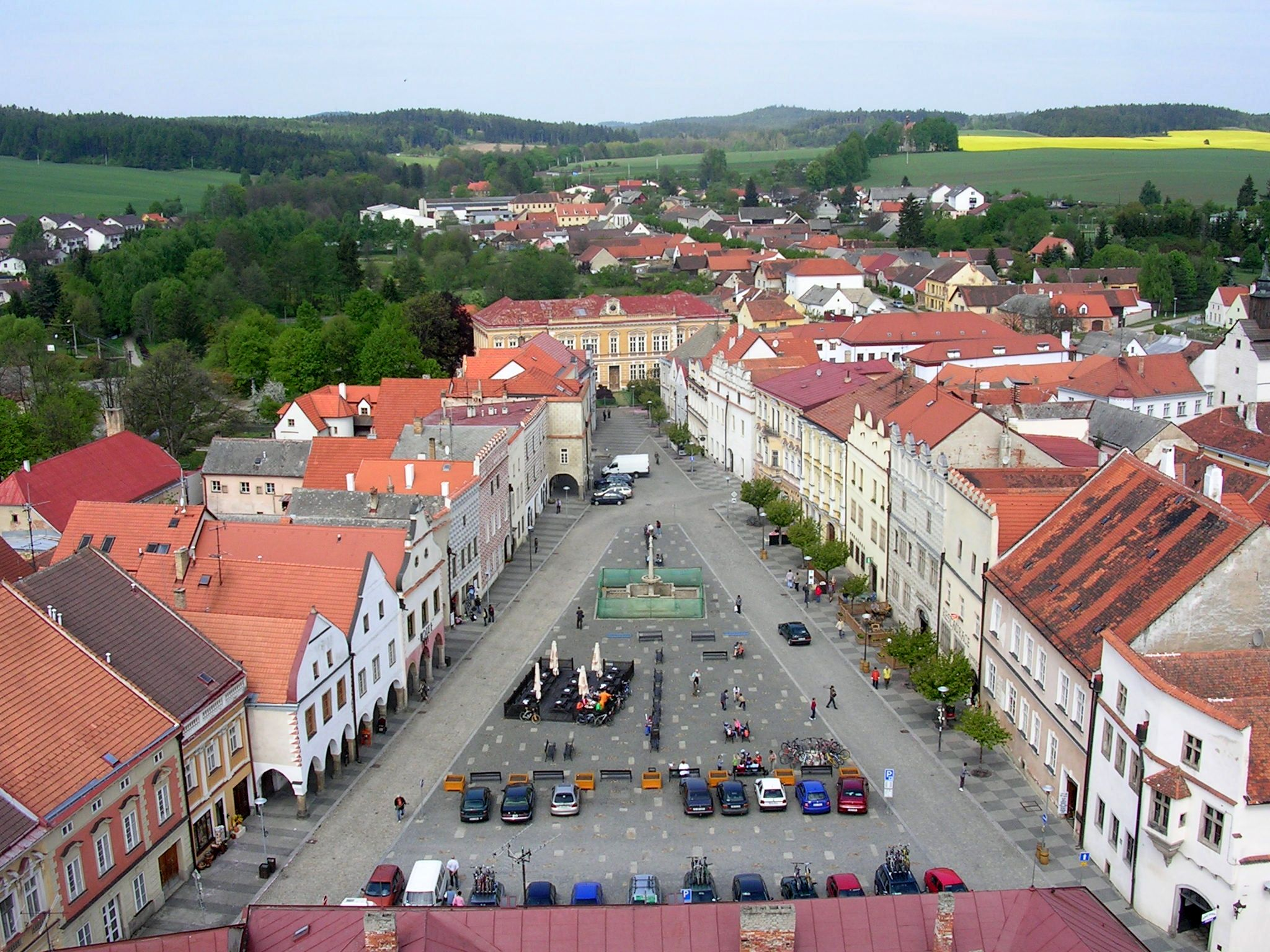
- The square Náměstí Míru

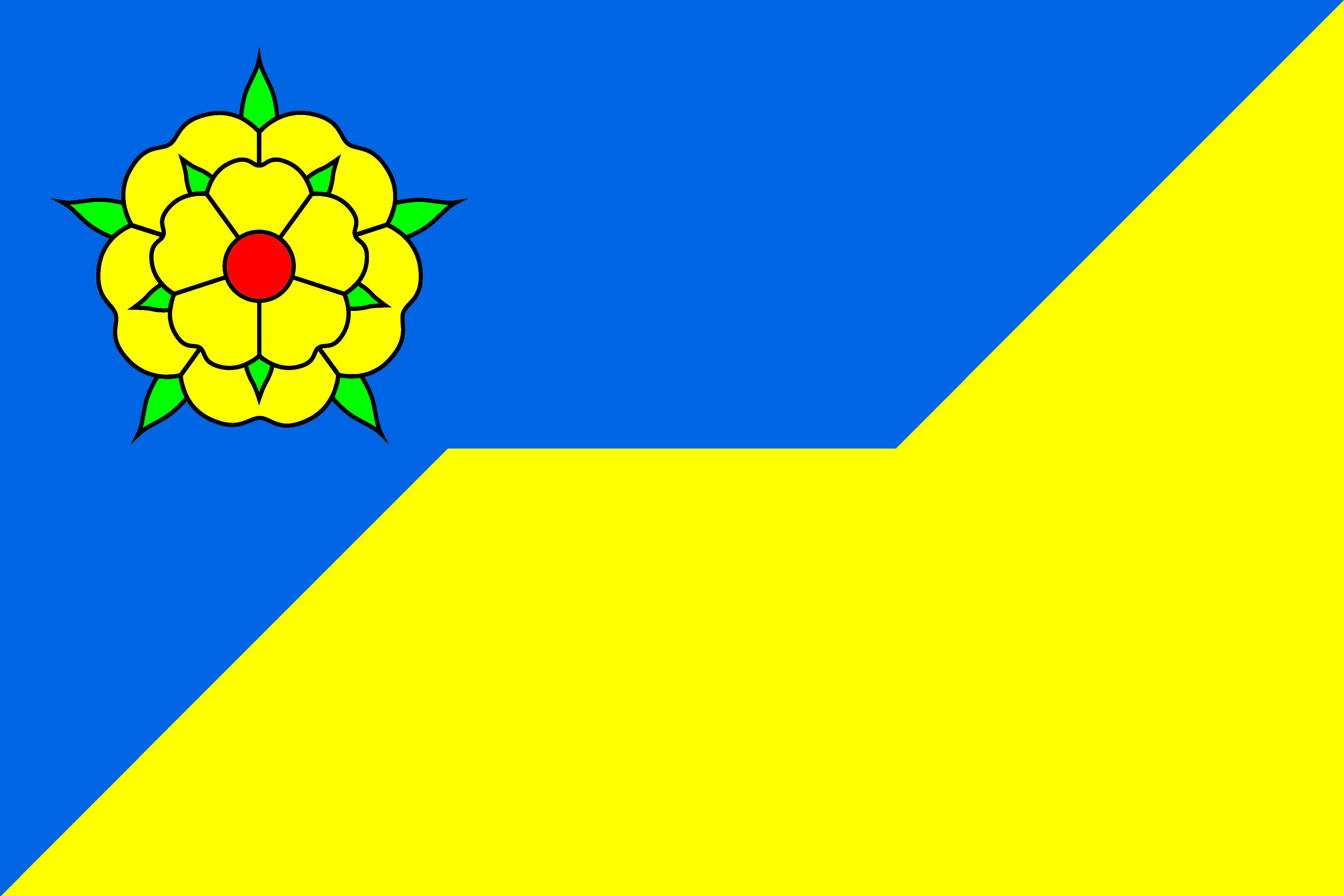
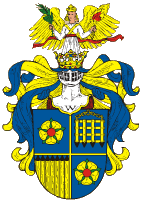
- Flag Coat of arms

- Location in the Czech Republic
- Coordinates: 48°59′51″N 15°21′5″E
- Country: Czech Republic
- Region: South Bohemian
- District: Jindřichův Hradec
- First mentioned: 1260

Government
  - Mayor: Hynek Blažek

Area
  - Total: 45.81 km^{2} (17.69 sq mi)
- Elevation: 512 m (1,680 ft)

Population (2026-01-01)
  - Total: 2,207
  - Density: 48.18/km^{2} (124.8/sq mi)
- Time zone: UTC+1 (CET)
  - Summer (DST): UTC+2 (CEST)
- Postal code: 378 81
- Website: www.slavonice-mesto.cz

Slavonice (Czech pronunciation: [ˈslavoɲɪtsɛ]; German: Zlabings) is a town in Jindřichův Hradec District in the South Bohemian Region of the Czech Republic. It has about 2,200 inhabitants. The town is located on the stream Slavonický potok, on the border with Austria.

Slavonice was founded in the 12th century and reached its greatest prosperity in the 16th century, when the town acquired its Renaissance look. The historic town centre is well preserved and is protected as an urban monument reservation.

== Administrative division ==
Slavonice consists of seven municipal parts (in brackets population according to the 2021 census):

- Slavonice (2,093)
- Kadolec (2)
- Maříž (10)
- Mutišov (55)
- Rubašov (3)
- Stálkov (37)
- Vlastkovec (41)

== Etymology ==
The name is derived from the personal name Slavoň, meaning "the village of Slavoň's people".

== Geography ==
Slavonice is located about 29 kilometres (18 mi) southeast of Jindřichův Hradec and 63 km (39 mi) east of České Budějovice. It lies on the border with Austria and is adjacent to the municipality of Waldkirchen an der Thaya. Despite being a part of the modern South Bohemian Region, the town lies in the historical land of Moravia.

The eastern part of the municipal territory with the town proper lies in the Křižanov Highlands, the western part lies in the Javořice Highlands and includes the highest point of Slavonice at 695 m (2,280 ft) above sea level. The stream Slavonický potok flows through the town and supplies several fishponds in the municipal territory.

== History ==
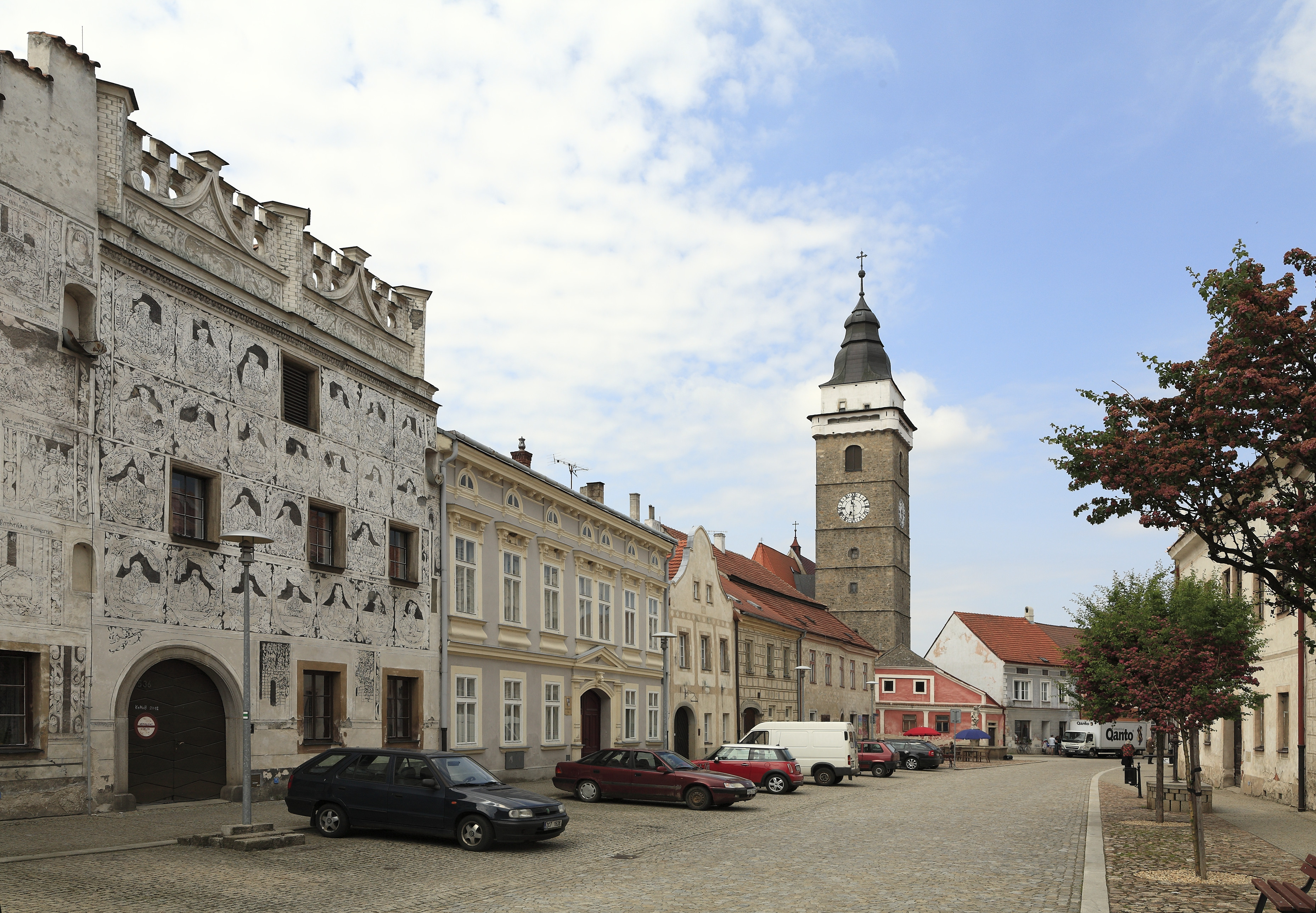
The square Horní náměstí

Slavonice was founded in the 12th century. The first written mention is from 1260. The settlement and later a market village slowly developed into a fortified town. From the 13th century, the underground system was built, which served as drainage and town's defense system. In the 14th century, Slavonice extended to the west (today's square Náměstí Míru) and to the east (today's square Horní náměstí).

At the end of the 15th century, ponds began to be established in the area. Slavonice reached its greatest prosperity in the 16th century, when it was an important town on the trade route from Prague to Vienna, which brought it great wealth. During these times, it gained its Renaissance look. When the route was relocated, the town's source of wealth dried up, which contributed to the preservation of a unique set of Renaissance houses.

The town and the surrounding countryside were lightly fortified in the period leading up to World War II. Some of these small bunker complexes have been repaired and refurbished. The area and defences were never used against Nazi Germany, being settled by a German-speaking majority, as the town and region had to be surrendered to the Nazi Germany following the Munich Agreement. The original German-speaking population was expelled in June 1945 following World War II.

Being so close to the Austrian border, Slavonice was heavily affected by the creation of the Iron Curtain during the period of communism. The hamlet of Maříž was emptied of its inhabitants during the communist era in an effort to prevent people from living anywhere near the border with non-communist Austria. After the Velvet Revolution and the fall of communism, Maříž was recolonised by ceramics artists.

== Demographics ==
Historical population

| Year | Pop. | ±% |
|---|---|---|
| 1869 | 3,663 | — |
| 1880 | 3,616 | −1.3% |
| 1890 | 3,468 | −4.1% |
| 1900 | 3,421 | −1.4% |
| 1910 | 3,394 | −0.8% |

| Year | Pop. | ±% |
|---|---|---|
| 1921 | 3,133 | −7.7% |
| 1930 | 3,063 | −2.2% |
| 1950 | 2,702 | −11.8% |
| 1961 | 2,743 | +1.5% |
| 1970 | 2,675 | −2.5% |

| Year | Pop. | ±% |
|---|---|---|
| 1980 | 2,670 | −0.2% |
| 1991 | 2,615 | −2.1% |
| 2001 | 2,717 | +3.9% |
| 2011 | 2,455 | −9.6% |
| 2021 | 2,241 | −8.7% |

Source: Censuses

== Transport ==
On the Czech–Austrian border is the road border crossing Slavonice / Fratres.

Slavonice is the final station on the railway line heading from Havlíčkův Brod.

== Sights ==
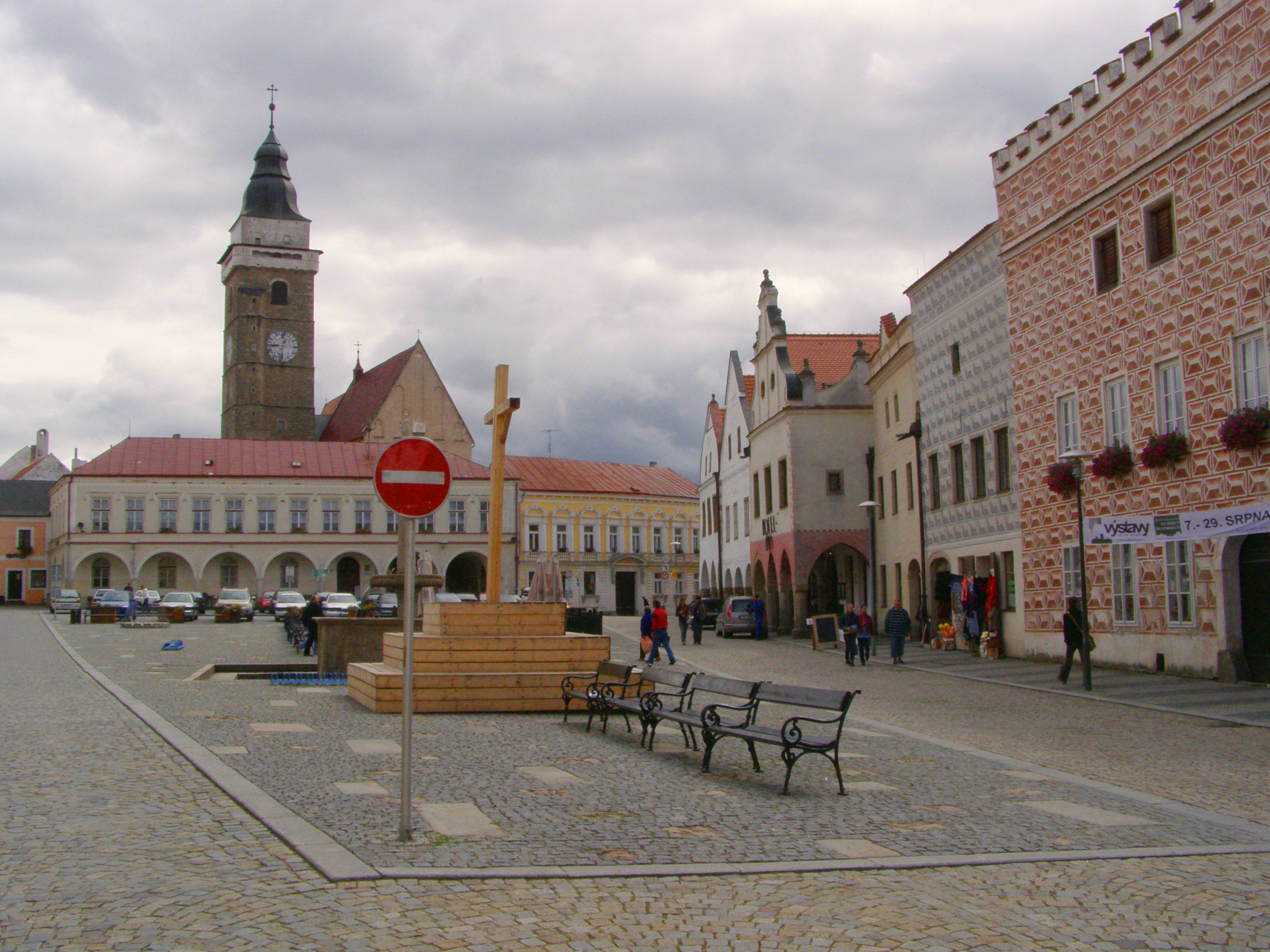
Náměstí Míru and the Church of the Assumption of the Virgin Mary

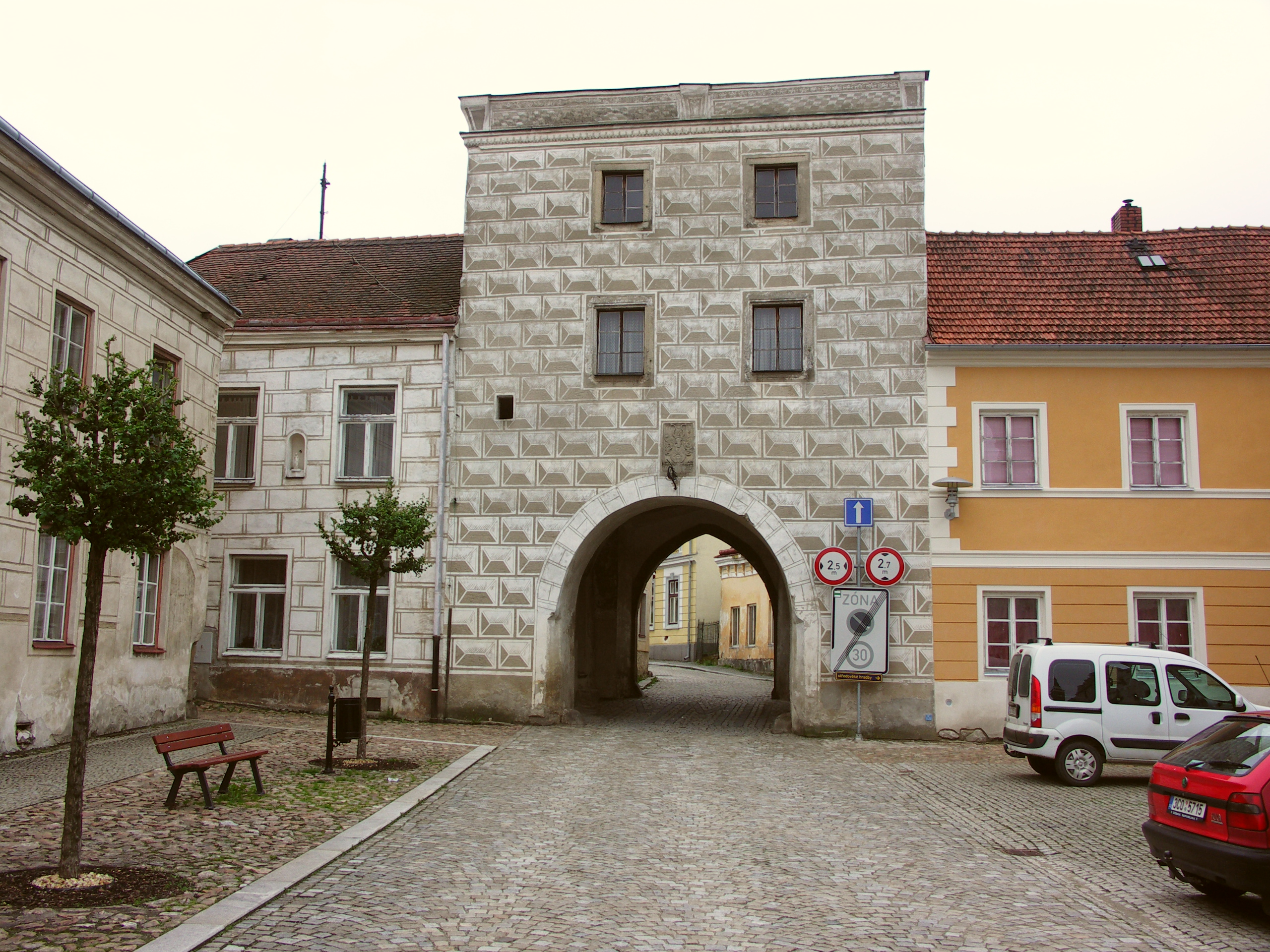
Jemnice Gate

The town has a traditional Renaissance town centre. Cellar vaults, facades of houses with typical gables derived from the Italian Renaissance and a guild rooms with murals have been preserved. The rich sgraffito decoration of the houses is also typical, including complex figural scenes.

The Church of the Assumption of the Virgin Mary is located between the two town squares. Its tower was built in 1503–1549 and is one of the symbols of the town. It is accessible to the public as a lookout tower.

The Church of Saint John the Baptist was built in the 13th or 14th century. It has a façade decorated with sgraffito from the end of the 16th century. Today it serves to cultural purposes. Church of the Holy Cross is a cemetery church from 1702. Outside the urban area, there is the pilgrimage Church of Corpus Cristi, which was built originally in the 13th century and renewed after it was burned down during the Hussite Wars.

The Gothic underground system is preserved to this day. About 380 metres (1,250 ft) of tunnels are open to the visitors. Part of the town fortifications have also been preserved, including two gates, two bastions and several fragments of town walls.

== In popular culture ==
The films Valerie and Her Week of Wonders (1970) and Barefoot (2017) were filmed here.

== Twin towns – sister cities ==
Slavonice is twinned with:

- Bogen, Germany
- Dobersberg, Austria
- Stakčín, Slovakia
