= Jezdovice =

- Municipality
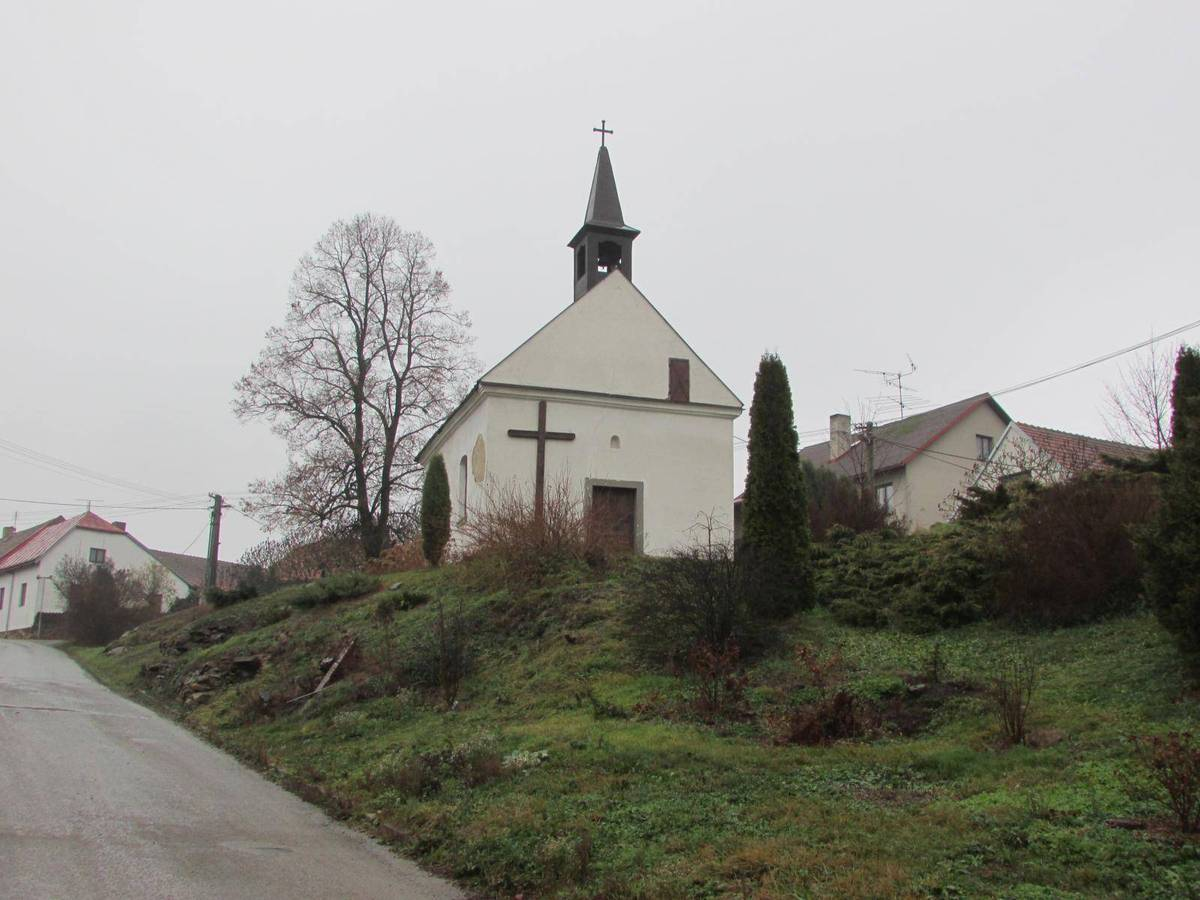
- Chapel of Saint Martin

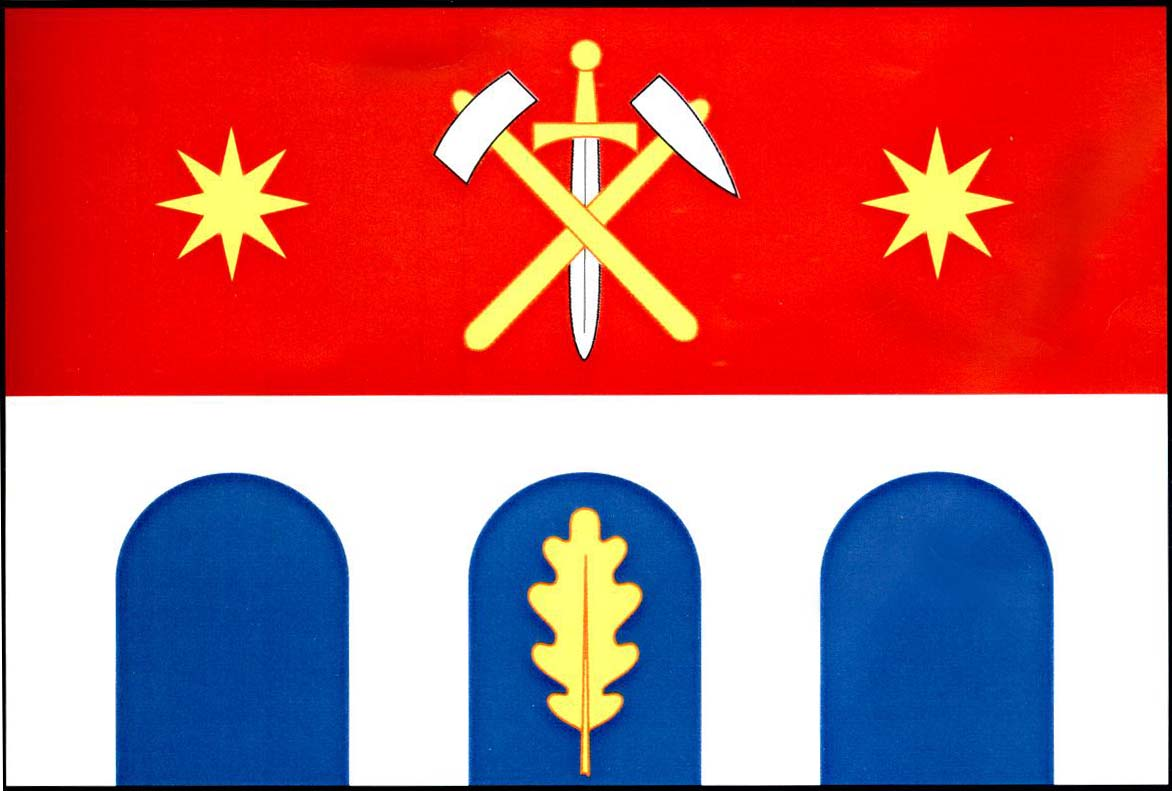
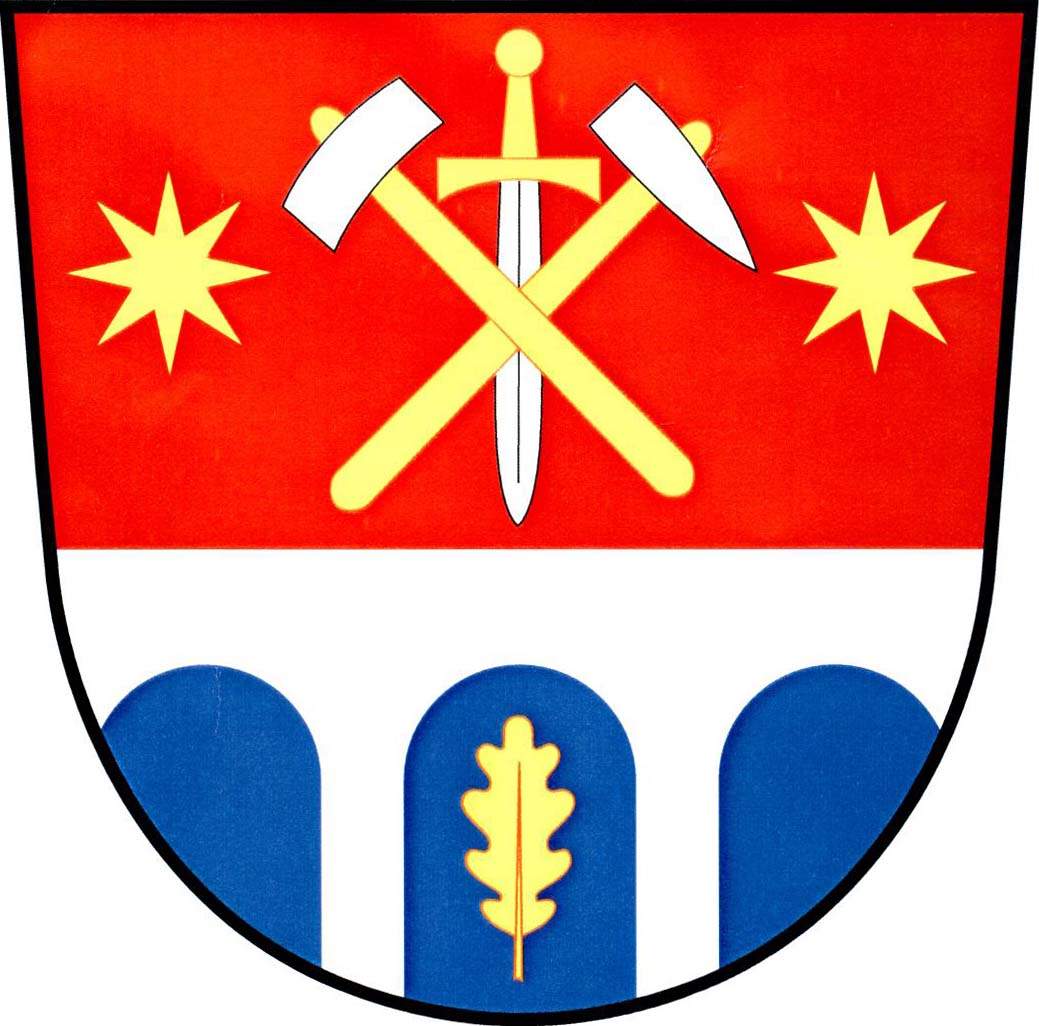
- Flag Coat of arms

- Location in the Czech Republic
- Coordinates: 49°19′23″N 15°29′3″E
- Country: Czech Republic
- Region: Vysočina
- District: Jihlava
- First mentioned: 1358

Area
  - Total: 5.58 km^{2} (2.15 sq mi)
- Elevation: 540 m (1,770 ft)

Population (2026-01-01)
  - Total: 268
  - Density: 48.0/km^{2} (124/sq mi)
- Time zone: UTC+1 (CET)
  - Summer (DST): UTC+2 (CEST)
- Postal code: 589 01
- Website: jezdovice.cz

Jezdovice (Czech pronunciation: [ˈjɛzdovɪtsɛ]) is a municipality and village in Jihlava District in the Vysočina Region of the Czech Republic. It has about 300 inhabitants.

== Geography ==
Jezdovice is located about 11 km (7 mi) southwest of Jihlava. It lies in the Křižanov Highlands. The highest point is at 640 m (2,100 ft) above sea level. The village is situated on the banks of the stream Třešťský potok and on the shore of the fishpond Jezdovický rybník. The territory is rich in small fishponds.

== History ==
The first written mention of Jezdovice is from 1358. Historically, the village is connected with silver mining.

== Demographics ==
Historical population

Year	Pop.	±%
1869	453	—
1880	461	+1.8%
1890	440	−4.6%
1900	417	−5.2%
1910	456	+9.4%

Year	Pop.	±%
1921	424	−7.0%
1930	403	−5.0%
1950	305	−24.3%
1961	295	−3.3%
1970	267	−9.5%

Year	Pop.	±%
1980	237	−11.2%
1991	223	−5.9%
2001	249	+11.7%
2011	252	+1.2%
2021	236	−6.3%

Source: Censuses

== Transport ==
Jezdovice is located on the railway line Havlíčkův Brod–Slavonice.

== Sights ==
In Jezdovice are two stone bridges from the 19th century that are technical monuments. The first one is a three-span bridge, which is 14 m (46 ft) long and 5 m (16 ft) wide and is among the oldest bridges in Moravia. The second one is a single-span bridge, which is 8 m (26 ft) long and 4.5 m (15 ft) wide.

The Chapel of Saint Martin dates from 1870.
