= Holeček =

Holeček (feminine: Holečková) is a Czech surname. Notable people include:

- Barbara Holecek (1942–2017), American film producer
- Jiří Holeček (born 1944), Czech ice hockey coach and former player
- John Holecek (born 1972), American football player
- Josef Holeček (canoeist) (1921–2005), Czech canoer
- Josef Holeček (writer) (1853–1929), Czech writer
- Libuše Holečková, Czech actress
- Marek Holeček (born 1974), Czech mountain climber
- Milan Holeček (born 1943), Czech tennis player
- Ondřej Holeček (born 1973), Czech rower

== See also ==
- Holetschek, a Germanized version of the surname
