= Johann Holetschek =

Austrian astronomer (1846–1923)

Johann Holetschek (29 August 1846 in Thuma – 20 November 1923 in Vienna) was an Austrian astronomer, known for his research on comets. Born in Thuma, in Lower Austria, he worked at the observatory of the University of Vienna. He died at Vienna.

The crater Holetschek on the Moon is named after him.

== Sources ==
- All About Austria
