= Kautzen =

- Municipality
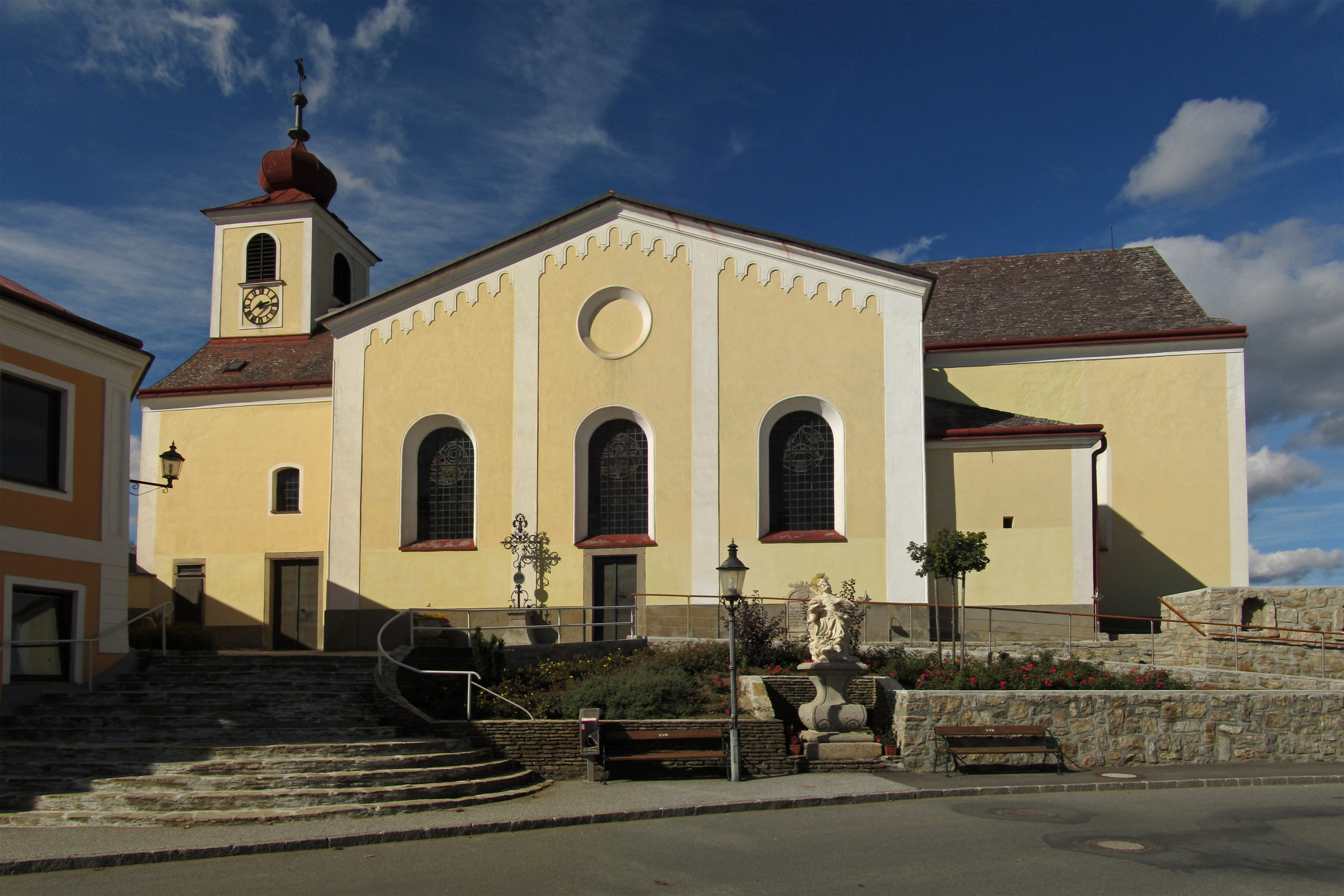
- Church of Saint James the Elder

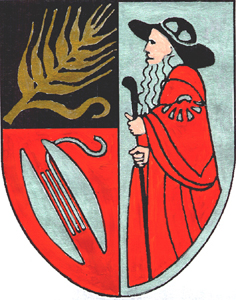
- Coat of arms

- Location within Austria
- Coordinates: 48°55′00″N 15°14′00″E
- Country: Austria
- State: Lower Austria
- District: Waidhofen an der Thaya

Government
  - Mayor: Manfred Wühl (ÖVP)

Area
  - Total: 35.41 km^{2} (13.67 sq mi)
- Elevation: 525 m (1,722 ft)

Population (2018-01-01)
  - Total: 1,119
  - Density: 31.60/km^{2} (81.85/sq mi)
- Time zone: UTC+1 (CET)
  - Summer (DST): UTC+2 (CEST)
- Postal code: 3851
- Area code: 02864
- Vehicle registration: WT
- Website: www.kautzen.gv.at

Kautzen is a municipality in the district of Waidhofen an der Thaya in the Austrian state of Lower Austria.

== Population ==
Historical population
Year	Pop.	±%
1971	1,803	—
1981	1,533	−15.0%
1991	1,389	−9.4%
2001	1,275	−8.2%

== Personalities ==
- Alois Stöger (1904 - 1999, Hainstetten), bishop
- Hans Peter Moravec (born 1948), engineer
- Erwin Hornek (1959), politician
