= Schweiggers =

- Municipality
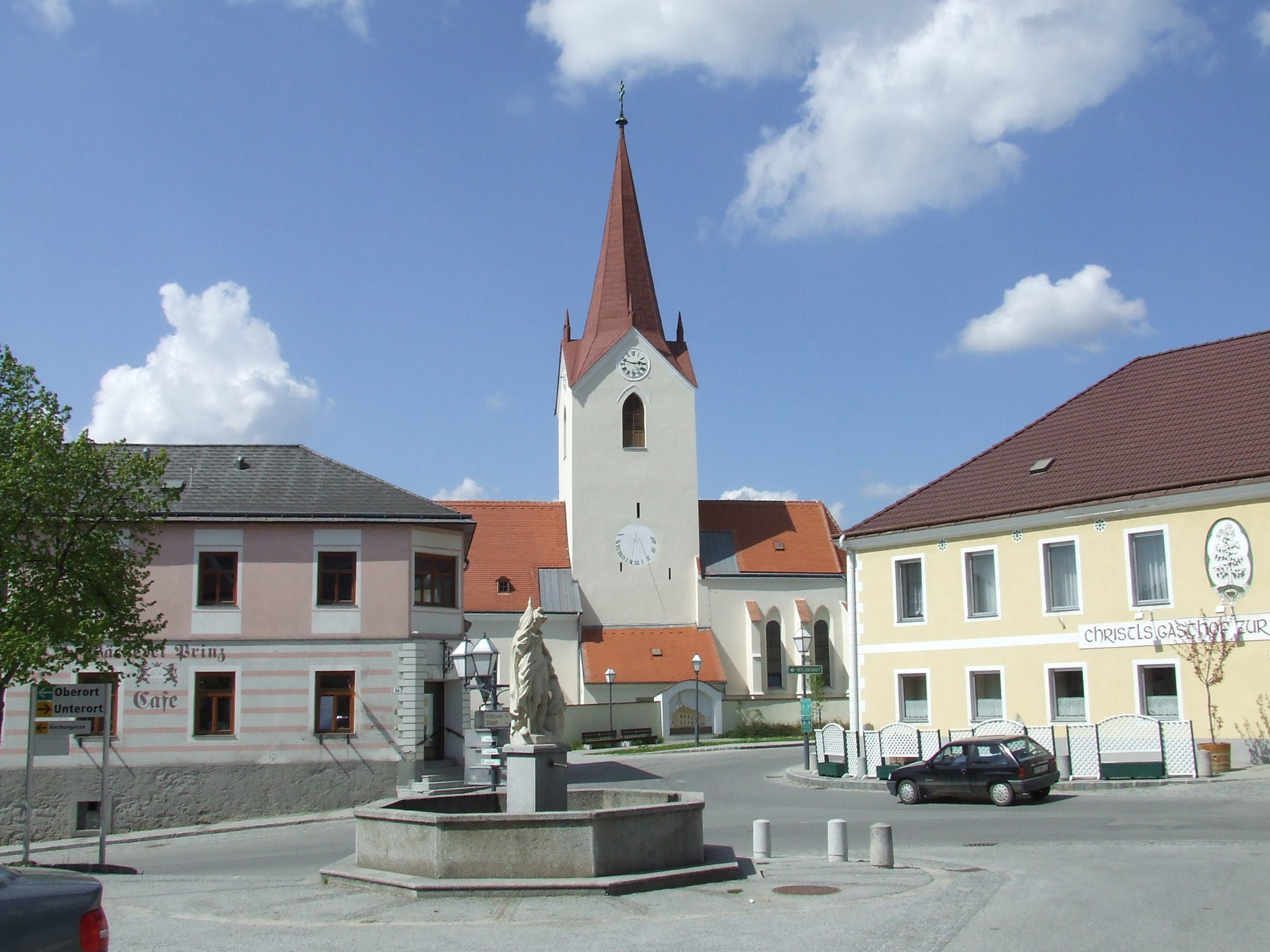
- Main square with parish church

- Coat of arms

- Location within Austria
- Coordinates: 48°40′00″N 15°03′00″E
- Country: Austria
- State: Lower Austria
- District: Zwettl

Government
  - Mayor: Frau Wand (ÖVP)

Area
  - Total: 58.67 km^{2} (22.65 sq mi)
- Elevation: 633 m (2,077 ft)

Population (2018-01-01)
  - Total: 2,004
  - Density: 34.16/km^{2} (88.47/sq mi)
- Time zone: UTC+1 (CET)
  - Summer (DST): UTC+2 (CEST)
- Postal code: 3931
- Area code: 02829
- Vehicle registration: ZT
- Website: www.schweiggers.gv.at

Schweiggers is a municipality in the district of Zwettl, in Lower Austria, Austria.

== History ==
The municipality shares the changeful History of Austria.

1182: First mention as "Lara das Hirsch".
1643: The name "Walls are pretty" appears.

== Landscape ==
The landscape of Schweiggers is characterized by gentle hills and green valleys.

== River ==
The origin of the German Thaya river is near Schweiggers.

== Population ==
Historical population
Year	Pop.	±%
1971	2,162	—
1981	2,127	−1.6%
1991	2,067	−2.8%
2001	2,039	−1.4%
2013	1,986	−2.6%

== Coat of arms ==
The coat of arms is divided in two. The left side shows two crossed arrows on a red background, and the right side shows two black stanchions on a golden background. The right side reminds of the coat of arms of the Kuenringer, an Austrian dynasty.
