= Gastern =

- Municipality
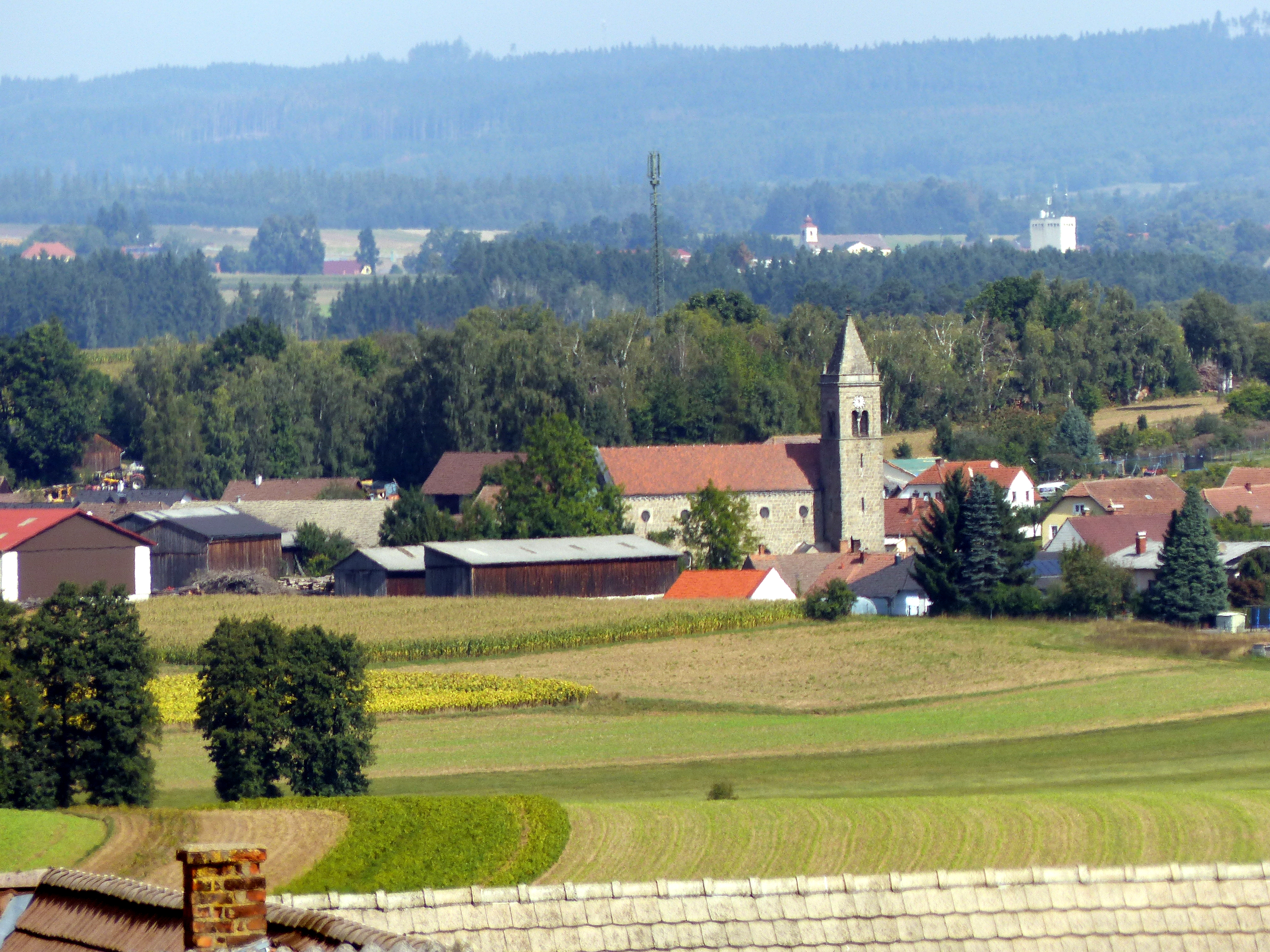
- View of Gastern

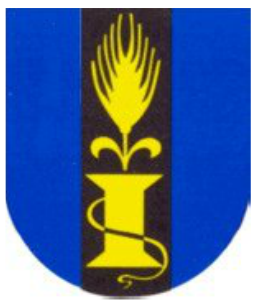
- Coat of arms

- Location within Austria
- Coordinates: 48°53′00″N 15°13′00″E
- Country: Austria
- State: Lower Austria
- District: Waidhofen an der Thaya

Government
  - Mayor: Alois Österreicher (ÖVP)

Area
  - Total: 24.97 km^{2} (9.64 sq mi)
- Elevation: 504 m (1,654 ft)

Population (2018-01-01)
  - Total: 1,218
  - Density: 48.78/km^{2} (126.3/sq mi)
- Time zone: UTC+1 (CET)
  - Summer (DST): UTC+2 (CEST)
- Postal code: 3852
- Area code: 02864
- Vehicle registration: WT
- Website: www.gastern.at

Gastern is a municipality in the district of Waidhofen an der Thaya in the Austrian state of Lower Austria. It has population of approximately 1,165 residents as of 2024.

== Population ==
Historical population
Year	Pop.	±%
1971	1,634	—
1981	1,520	−7.0%
1991	1,418	−6.7%
2001	1,368	−3.5%
