= Ludweis-Aigen =

- Municipality
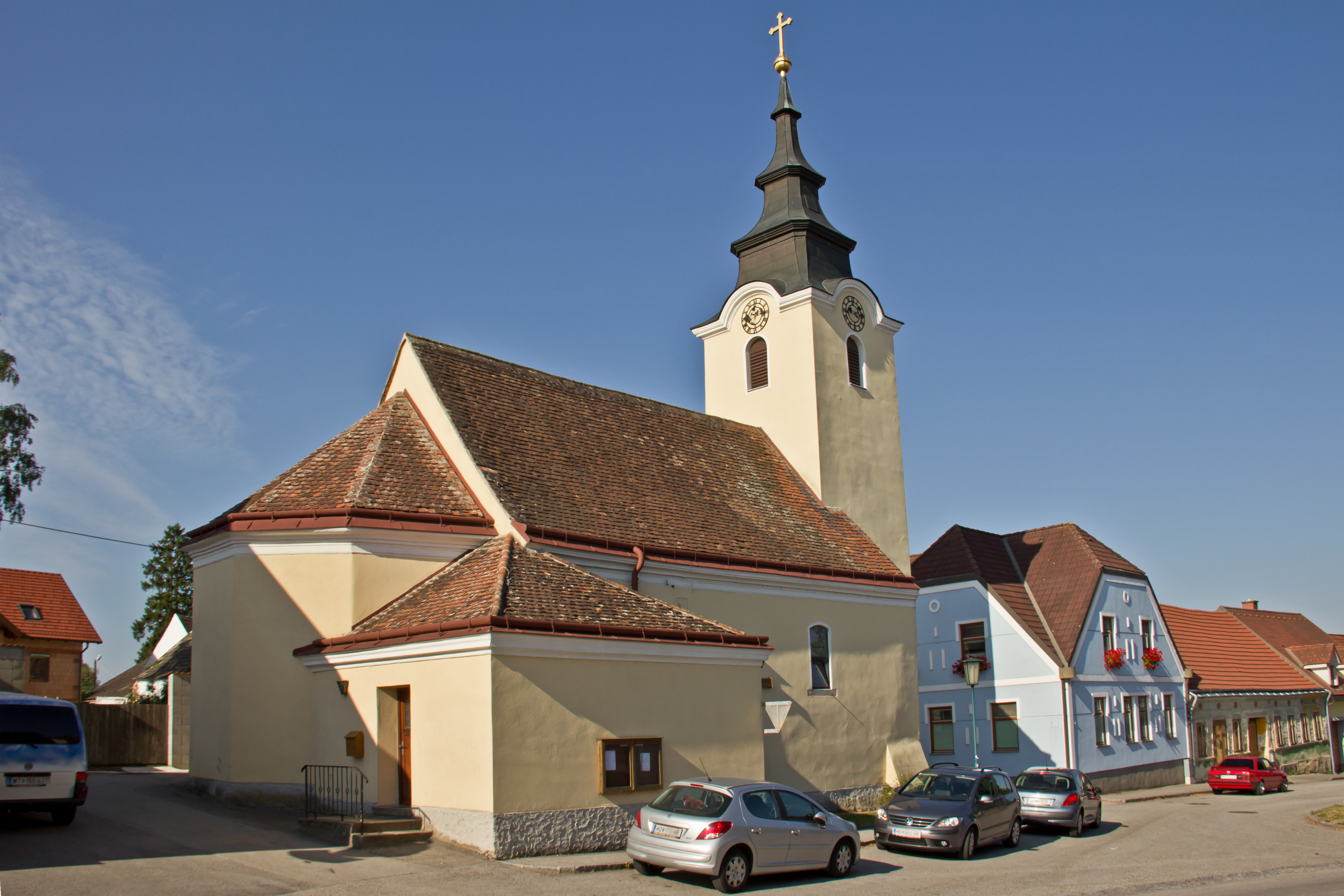
- Ludweis parish church

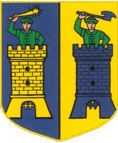
- Coat of arms

- Location within Austria
- Coordinates: 48°46′00″N 15°29′00″E
- Country: Austria
- State: Lower Austria
- District: Waidhofen an der Thaya

Government
  - Mayor: Walter Zeindl (ÖVP)

Area
  - Total: 51.19 km^{2} (19.76 sq mi)
- Elevation: 507 m (1,663 ft)

Population (2018-01-01)
  - Total: 914
  - Density: 17.9/km^{2} (46.2/sq mi)
- Time zone: UTC+1 (CET)
  - Summer (DST): UTC+2 (CEST)
- Postal code: 3762
- Area code: 02847
- Vehicle registration: WT
- Website: www.ludweis-aigen.at

Ludweis-Aigen is a municipality in the district of Waidhofen an der Thaya in the Austrian state of Lower Austria.

== Population ==
Historical population
Year	Pop.	±%
1971	1,471	—
1981	1,310	−10.9%
1991	1,136	−13.3%
2001	1,023	−9.9%
