= Pfaffenschlag bei Waidhofen =

Pfaffenschlag bei Waidhofen a.d.Thaya
- Municipality
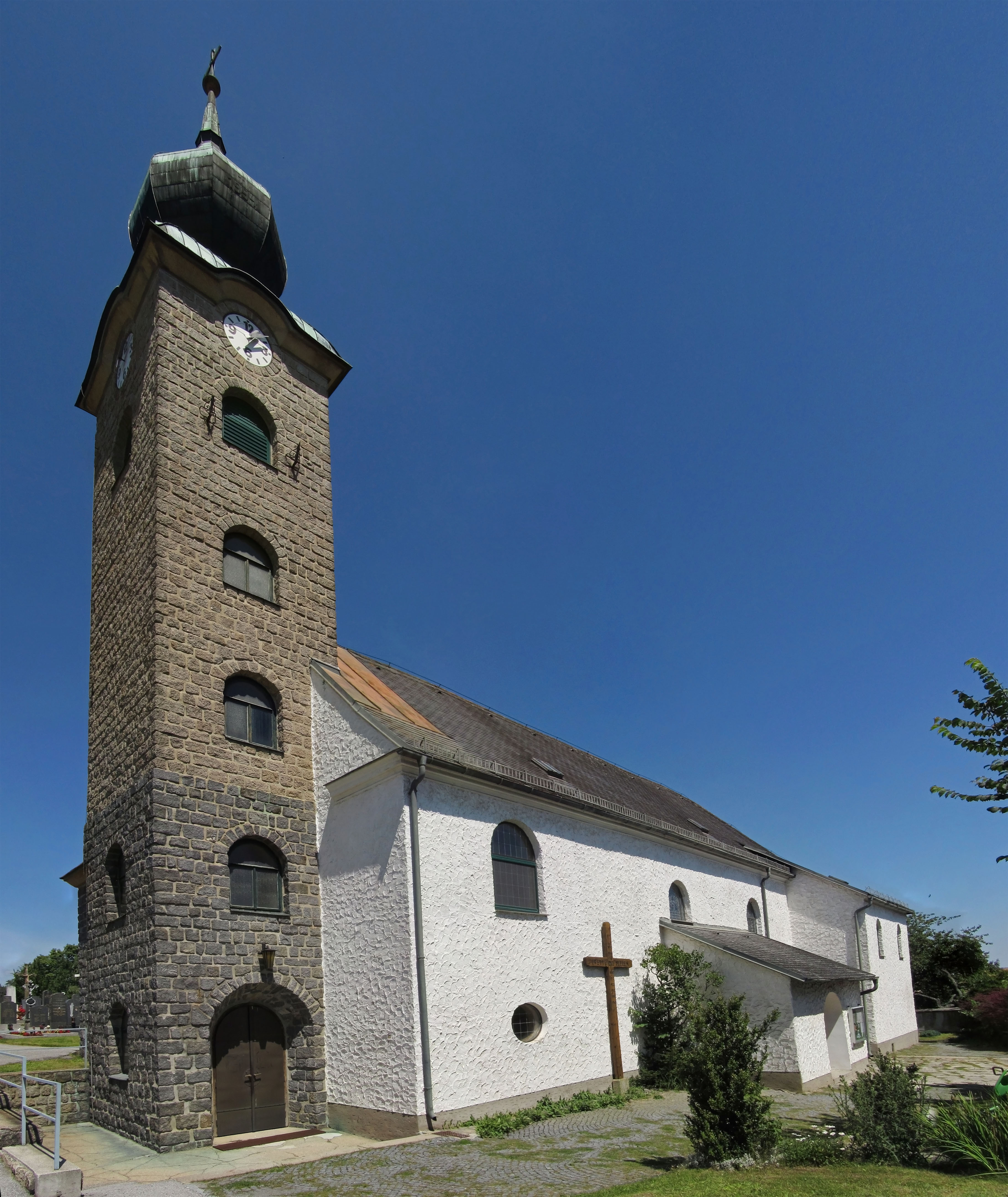
- Pfaffenschlag parish church

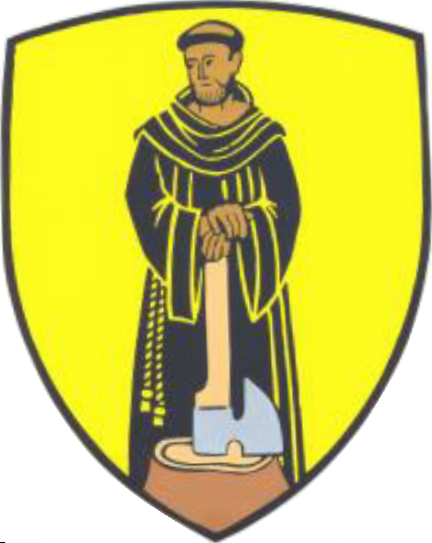
- Coat of arms

- Location within Austria
- Coordinates: 48°50′00″N 15°11′00″E
- Country: Austria
- State: Lower Austria
- District: Waidhofen an der Thaya

Government
  - Mayor: Johannes Semper (ÖVP)

Area
  - Total: 29.67 km^{2} (11.46 sq mi)
- Elevation: 570 m (1,870 ft)

Population (2018-01-01)
  - Total: 913
  - Density: 30.8/km^{2} (79.7/sq mi)
- Time zone: UTC+1 (CET)
  - Summer (DST): UTC+2 (CEST)
- Postal code: 3834
- Area code: 02848
- Vehicle registration: WT
- Website: www.pfaffenschlag.at

Pfaffenschlag bei Waidhofen (completely: Pfaffenschlag bei Waidhofen an der Thaya, German pronunciation: [ˈp͡fafn̩ˌʃlaːk baɪ̯ ˌvaɪ̯tˈhoːfn̩ an deːɐ̯ ˈtaɪ]) is a municipality in the district of Waidhofen an der Thaya in the Austrian state of Lower Austria.

== Population ==
Historical population
Year	Pop.	±%
1971	1,193	—
1981	1,071	−10.2%
1991	970	−9.4%
2001	980	+1.0%
