= Windigsteig =

- Municipality
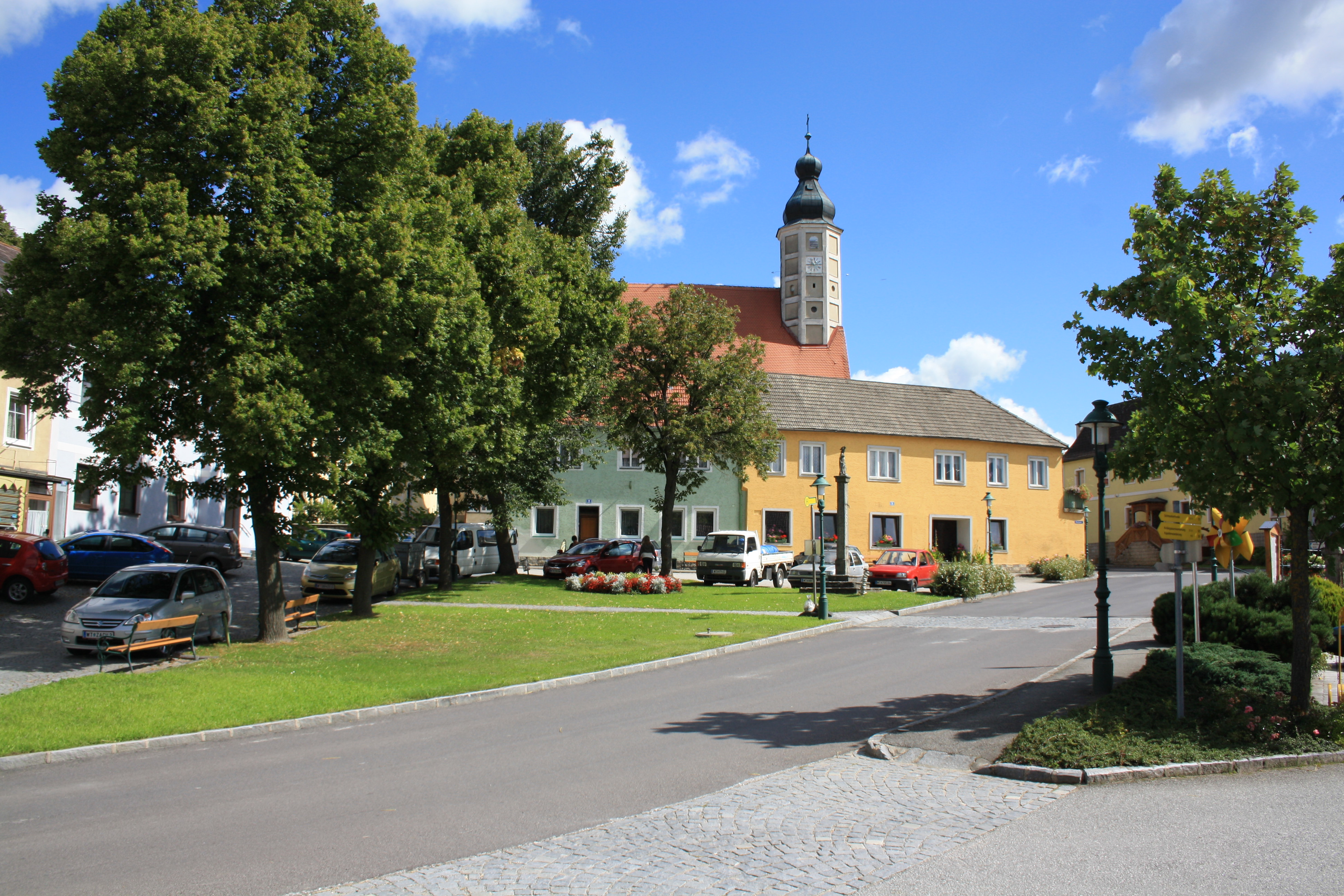
- Windigsteig market square

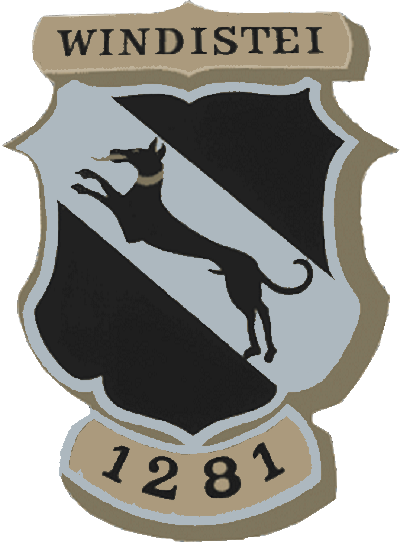
- Coat of arms

- Location within Austria
- Coordinates: 48°46′00″N 15°17′00″E
- Country: Austria
- State: Lower Austria
- District: Waidhofen an der Thaya

Government
  - Mayor: Alfred Bräuer (ÖVP)

Area
  - Total: 25.52 km^{2} (9.85 sq mi)
- Elevation: 498 m (1,634 ft)

Population (2018-01-01)
  - Total: 945
  - Density: 37.0/km^{2} (95.9/sq mi)
- Time zone: UTC+1 (CET)
  - Summer (DST): UTC+2 (CEST)
- Postal code: 3841
- Area code: 02849
- Vehicle registration: WT
- Website: www.windigsteig.gv.at

Windigsteig is a municipality in the district of Waidhofen an der Thaya in the Austrian state of Lower Austria.

== Geography ==
Windigsteig lies in the northern Waldviertel in Lower Austria. The market municipality covers an area of 25.49 square kilometres, 21.57% of which is wooded.

=== Municipal subdivisions ===
The municipality includes the following 13 villages (in brackets is their population as at 1 January 2015):

- Edengans (19)
- Grünau (31)
- Kleinreichenbach (72)
- Kottschallings (66)
- Lichtenberg (60)
- Markl (112)
- Matzlesschlag (48)
- Meires (60)
- Rafings (82)
- Rafingsberg (17)
- Waldberg (49)
- Willings (41)
- Windigsteig (312)

The Cadastral municipalities are Edengans, Grünau, Kleinreichenbach, Kottschallings, Lichtenberg, Markl, Matzlesschlag, Meires, Rafings, Waldberg, Willings and Windigsteig.

== Population ==
Historical population
Year	Pop.	±%
1971	1,431	—
1981	1,267	−11.5%
1991	1,168	−7.8%
2001	1,117	−4.4%
