= Schwarzenau, Lower Austria =

Schwarzenau
- Municipality
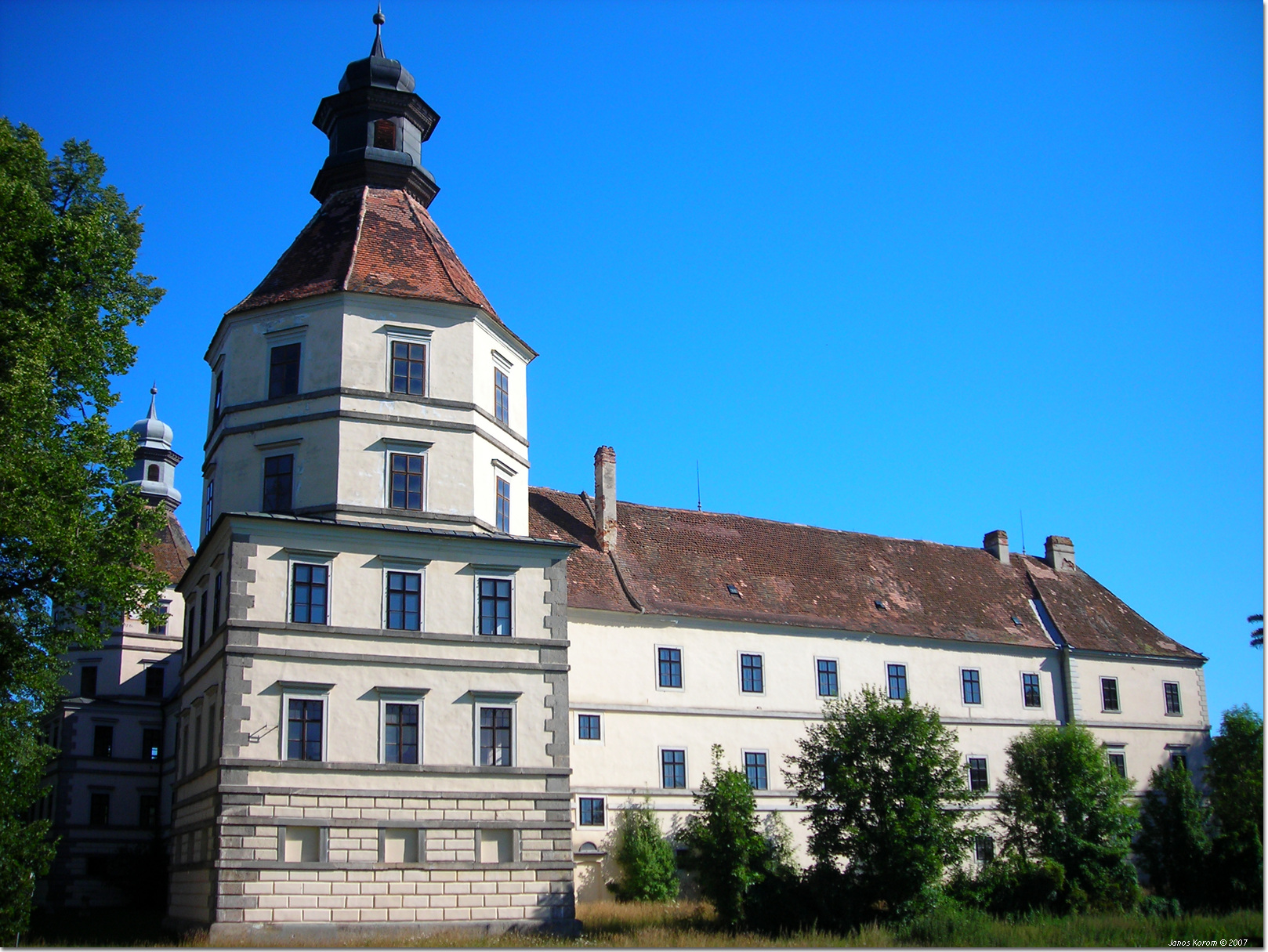
- Schwarzenau Castle

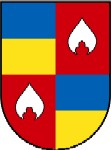
- Coat of arms

- Location within Austria
- Coordinates: 48°44′00″N 15°15′00″E
- Country: Austria
- State: Lower Austria
- District: Zwettl

Government
  - Mayor: Karl Elsigan (ÖVP)

Area
  - Total: 28.14 km^{2} (10.86 sq mi)
- Elevation: 498 m (1,634 ft)

Population (2018-01-01)
  - Total: 1,532
  - Density: 54.44/km^{2} (141.0/sq mi)
- Time zone: UTC+1 (CET)
  - Summer (DST): UTC+2 (CEST)
- Postal code: 3900
- Area code: 02849
- Vehicle registration: ZT
- Website: www.wvnet.at

Schwarzenau is a market town in the District Zwettl in the Austrian state of Lower Austria. Schwarzenau is located on the German Thaya.

== Population ==
Historical population
Year	Pop.	±%
1971	1,910	—
1981	1,929	+1.0%
1991	1,714	−11.1%
2001	1,591	−7.2%

== People ==
- Florian Berndl (1856-1934)
