= Groß-Siegharts =

- Municipality
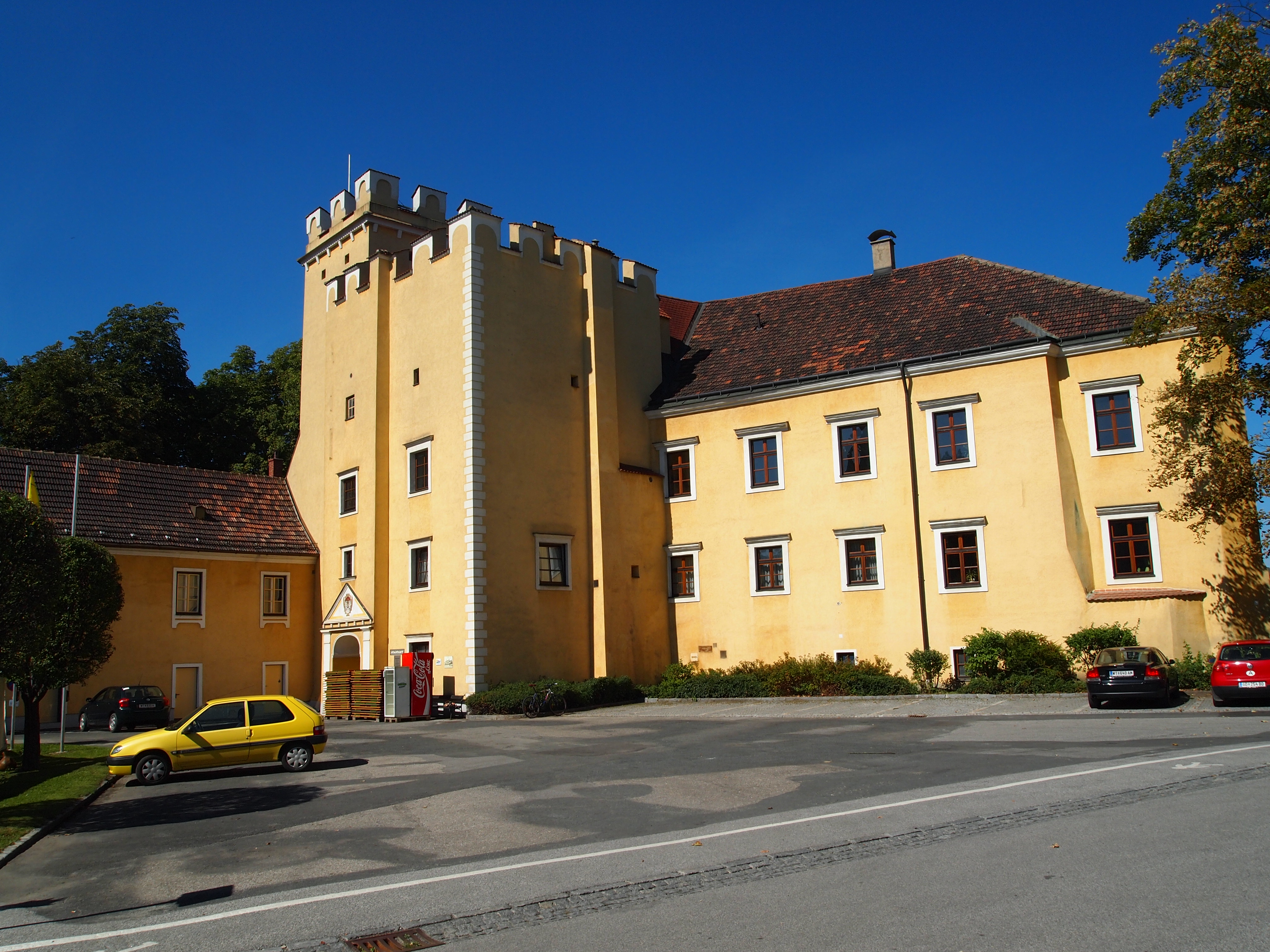
- Groß-Siegharts Castle

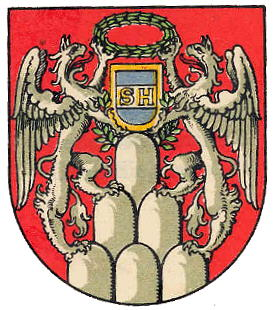
- Coat of arms

- Location within Austria
- Coordinates: 48°47′00″N 15°24′00″E
- Country: Austria
- State: Lower Austria
- District: Waidhofen an der Thaya

Government
  - Mayor: Gerald Matzinger (SPÖ)

Area
  - Total: 44.28 km^{2} (17.10 sq mi)
- Elevation: 534 m (1,752 ft)

Population (2018-01-01)
  - Total: 2,775
  - Density: 62.67/km^{2} (162.3/sq mi)
- Time zone: UTC+1 (CET)
  - Summer (DST): UTC+2 (CEST)
- Postal code: 3812
- Area code: 02847
- Vehicle registration: WT
- Website: www.siegharts.at

Groß-Siegharts is a municipality in the district of Waidhofen an der Thaya in the Austrian state of Lower Austria.

== Population ==
Historical population
Year	Pop.	±%
1869	4,247	—
1880	4,452	+4.8%
1890	4,364	−2.0%
1900	4,302	−1.4%
1910	4,305	+0.1%
1923	3,836	−10.9%
1934	3,850	+0.4%
1939	3,975	+3.2%
1951	4,073	+2.5%
1961	3,825	−6.1%
1971	3,545	−7.3%
1981	3,359	−5.2%
1991	3,236	−3.7%
2001	3,089	−4.5%
2011	2,847	−7.8%
