= Waidhofen an der Thaya =

- Municipality
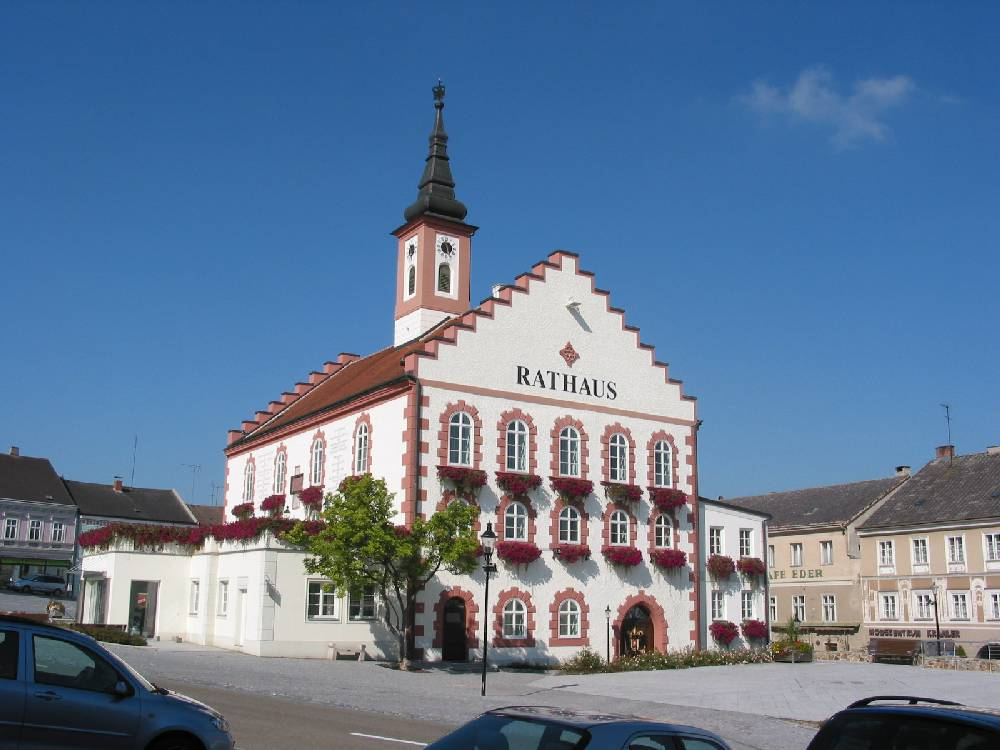
- Town hall

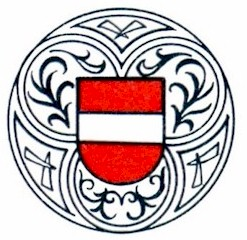
- Coat of arms

- Location within Austria
- Coordinates: 48°49′00″N 15°17′00″E
- Country: Austria
- State: Lower Austria
- District: Waidhofen an der Thaya

Government
  - Mayor: Robert Altschach (ÖVP)

Area
  - Total: 46.05 km^{2} (17.78 sq mi)
- Elevation: 510 m (1,670 ft)

Population (2018-01-01)
  - Total: 5,501
  - Density: 119.5/km^{2} (309.4/sq mi)
- Time zone: UTC+1 (CET)
  - Summer (DST): UTC+2 (CEST)
- Postal code: 3830
- Area code: 02842
- Vehicle registration: WT
- Website: www.waidhofen-thaya.at

Waidhofen an der Thaya (German pronunciation: [ˌvaɪ̯tˈhoːfn̩ an deːɐ̯ ˈtaːja]; Czech: Český Bejdov) is an Austrian town located on the German Thaya river in the district of the same name in Lower Austria. It is the northernmost of the capitals of the Districts of Austria.

== Population ==
Historical population
Year	Pop.	±%
1869	3,894	—
1880	4,091	+5.1%
1890	4,075	−0.4%
1900	4,203	+3.1%
1910	4,515	+7.4%
1923	4,400	−2.5%
1934	4,614	+4.9%
1939	4,755	+3.1%
1951	5,157	+8.5%
1961	5,120	−0.7%
1971	5,198	+1.5%
1981	5,401	+3.9%
1991	5,555	+2.9%
2001	5,750	+3.5%
2011	5,693	−1.0%

== Twin cities ==
- Heubach, Germany, since 1982
- Telč, Czech Republic, since 1992

== Personalities ==
- Birgit Zotz, writer and anthropologist
- Alexander Wurz, racing driver
- David Schalko, writer, director
