= Thaya, Austria =

Thaya
- Municipality
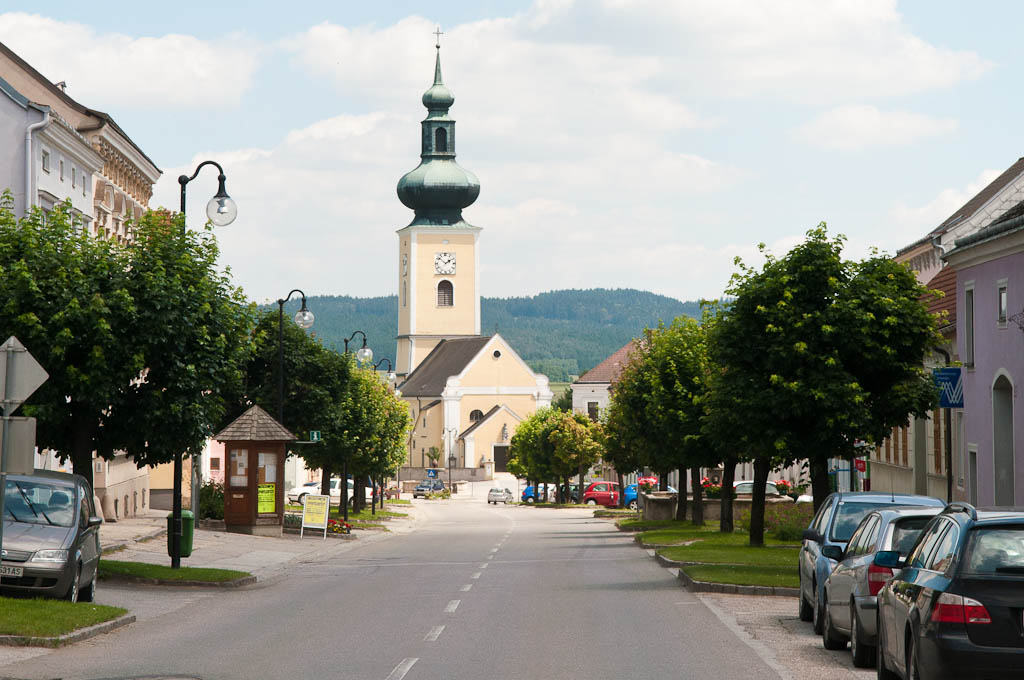
- Church of Saints Peter and Paul

- Coat of arms

- Location within Austria
- Coordinates: 48°51′00″N 15°17′00″E
- Country: Austria
- State: Lower Austria
- District: Waidhofen an der Thaya

Government
  - Mayor: Eduard Köck (ÖVP)

Area
  - Total: 43.33 km^{2} (16.73 sq mi)
- Elevation: 484 m (1,588 ft)

Population (2018-01-01)
  - Total: 1,380
  - Density: 31.8/km^{2} (82.5/sq mi)
- Time zone: UTC+1 (CET)
  - Summer (DST): UTC+2 (CEST)
- Postal code: 3842
- Area code: 02842
- Vehicle registration: WT
- Website: www.thaya.at

Thaya is a municipality in the district of Waidhofen an der Thaya in the Austrian state of Lower Austria.

== Population ==
Historical population
Year	Pop.	±%
1971	1,755	—
1981	1,548	−11.8%
1991	1,424	−8.0%
2001	1,468	+3.1%
2013	1,724	+17.4%
