= Waidhofen an der Thaya District =

Coordinates: 48.844°N 15.299°E

Waidhofen an der Thaya District Bezirk Waidhofen an der Thaya
- District
- Country: Austria
- State: Lower Austria
- Number of municipalities: 15
- Administrative seat: Waidhofen an der Thaya

Government
  - District Governor: Manuela Herzog

Area
  - Total: 669.1 km^{2} (258.3 sq mi)

Population (2001)
  - Total: 28,197
  - Density: 42.14/km^{2} (109.1/sq mi)
- Time zone: UTC+01:00 (CET)
  - Summer (DST): UTC+02:00 (CEST)
- Vehicle registration: WT

Bezirk Waidhofen an der Thaya is a district of the state of Lower Austria in Austria. It is located at the north and north-west of the state.

== Municipalities ==
Suburbs, hamlets and other subdivisions of a municipality are indicated in small characters.

- Dietmanns
  - Alt-Dietmanns, Neu-Dietmanns
- Dobersberg
  - Brunn, Dobersberg, Goschenreith am Taxenbache, Großharmanns, Hohenau, Kleinharmanns, Lexnitz, Merkengersch, Reibers, Reinolz, Riegers, Schuppertholz
- Gastern
  - Frühwärts, Garolden, Gastern, Immenschlag, Kleinmotten, Kleinzwettl, Ruders, Weißenbach, Wiesmaden
- Groß-Siegharts
  - Ellends, Fistritz, Groß-Siegharts, Loibes, Sieghartsles, Waldreichs, Weinern, Wienings
- Karlstein an der Thaya
  - Eggersdorf, Göpfritzschlag, Goschenreith, Griesbach, Hohenwarth, Karlstein an der Thaya, Münchreith an der Thaya, Obergrünbach, Schlader, Thuma, Thures, Wertenau
- Kautzen
  - Engelbrechts, Groß-Taxen, Kautzen, Kleingerharts, Klein-Taxen, Pleßberg, Reinberg-Dobersberg, Tiefenbach, Triglas
- Ludweis-Aigen
  - Aigen, Blumau an der Wild, Diemschlag, Drösiedl, Drösiedl, Kollmitzgraben, Liebenberg, Ludweis, Oedt an der Wild, Pfaffenschlag, Radessen, Radl, Sauggern, Seebs, Tröbings
- Pfaffenschlag bei Waidhofen
  - Arnolz, Artolz, Eisenreichs, Großeberharts, Johannessiedlung, Kleingöpfritz, Pfaffenschlag bei Waidhofen a.d.Thaya, Rohrbach, Schwarzenberg
- Raabs an der Thaya
  - Alberndorf, Eibenstein, Großau, Koggendorf, Kollmitzdörfl, Liebnitz, Lindau, Luden, Modsiedl, Mostbach, Neuriegers, Niklasberg, Nonndorf, Oberndorf bei Raabs, Oberndorf bei Weikertschlag, Oberpfaffendorf, Pommersdorf, Primmersdorf, Raabs an der Thaya, Rabesreith, Reith, Rossa, Schaditz, Speisendorf, Süßenbach, Trabersdorf, Unterpertholz, Unterpfaffendorf, Weikertschlag an der Thaya, Wetzles, Wilhelmshof, Zabernreith, Zemmendorf, Ziernreith
- Thaya
  - Eggmanns, Großgerharts, Jarolden, Niederedlitz, Oberedlitz, Peigarten, Ranzles, Schirnes, Thaya
- Vitis
  - Eschenau, Eulenbach, Grafenschlag, Großrupprechts, Heinreichs, Jaudling, Jetzles, Kaltenbach, Kleingloms, Kleinschönau, Schacherdorf, Schoberdorf, Sparbach, Stoies, Vitis, Warnungs
- Waidhofen an der Thaya
  - Altwaidhofen, Dimling, Götzles, Hollenbach, Jasnitz, Kleineberharts, Matzles, Puch, Pyhra, Schlagles, Ulrichschlag, Vestenötting, Waidhofen an der Thaya
- Waidhofen an der Thaya-Land
  - Brunn, Buchbach, Edelprinz, Götzweis, Griesbach, Kainraths, Nonndorf, Sarning, Vestenpoppen, Wiederfeld, Wohlfahrts
- Waldkirchen an der Thaya
  - Fratres, Gilgenberg, Rappolz, Rudolz, Schönfeld, Waldhers, Waldkirchen an der Thaya
- Windigsteig
  - Edengans, Grünau, Kleinreichenbach, Kottschallings, Lichtenberg, Markl, Matzlesschlag, Meires, Rafings, Rafingsberg, Waldberg, Willings, Windigsteig
