= Waldkirchen an der Thaya =

- Municipality
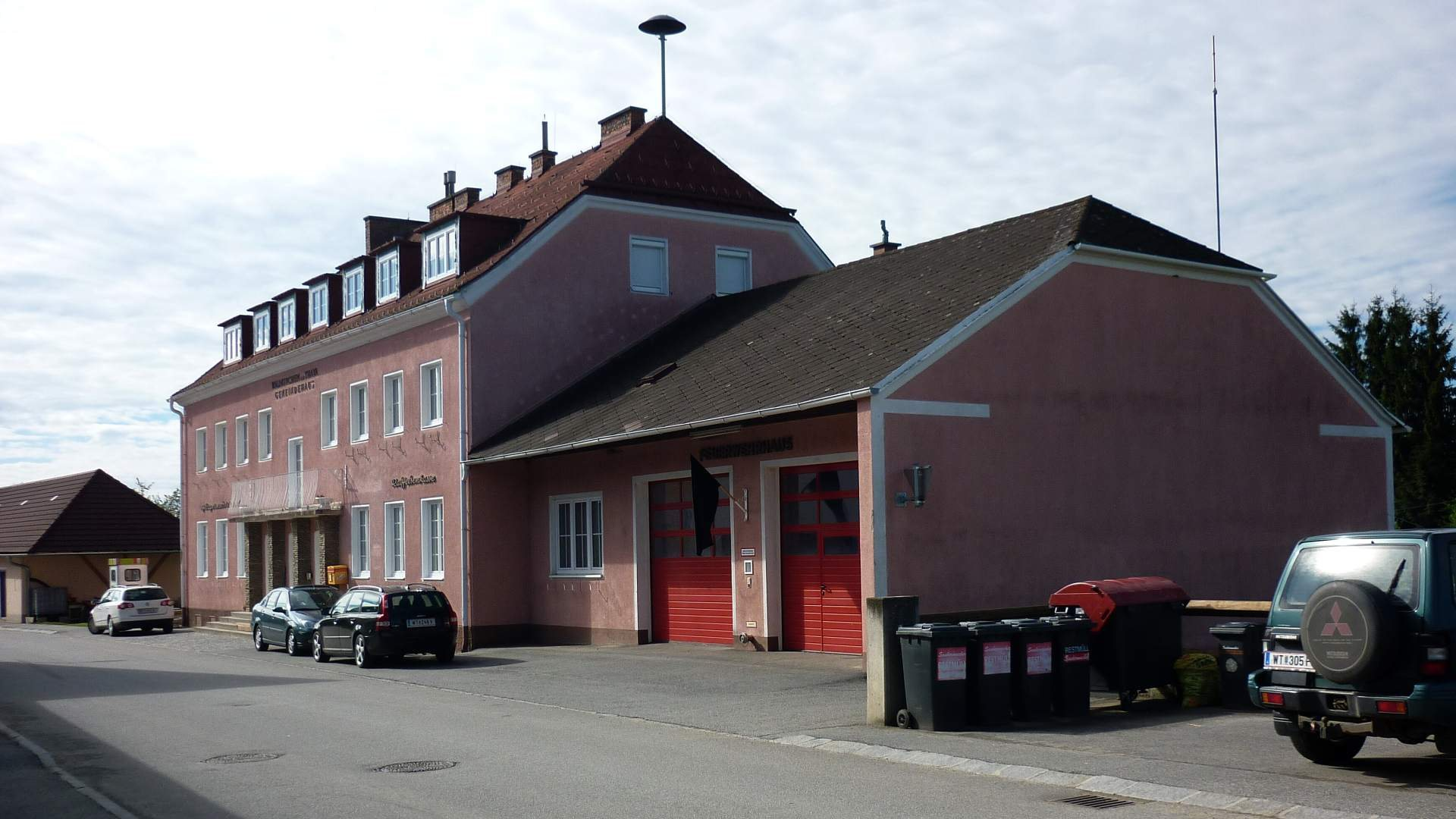
- Municipal office

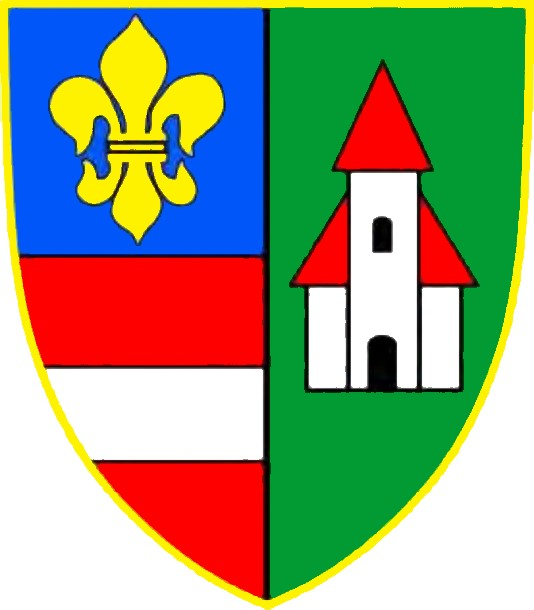
- Coat of arms

- Location within Austria
- Coordinates: 48°56′00″N 15°21′00″E
- Country: Austria
- State: Lower Austria
- District: Waidhofen an der Thaya

Government
  - Mayor: Rudolf Hofstätter (ÖVP)

Area
  - Total: 42.71 km^{2} (16.49 sq mi)
- Elevation: 478 m (1,568 ft)

Population (2018-01-01)
  - Total: 534
  - Density: 12.5/km^{2} (32.4/sq mi)
- Time zone: UTC+1 (CET)
  - Summer (DST): UTC+2 (CEST)
- Postal code: 3844
- Area code: 02843
- Vehicle registration: WT
- Website: www.waldkirchen-thaya.at

Waldkirchen an der Thaya is a municipality in the district of Waidhofen an der Thaya in the Austrian state of Lower Austria.

== Population ==
Historical population
Year	Pop.	±%
1971	1,070	—
1981	902	−15.7%
1991	758	−16.0%
2001	669	−11.7%
