= Vitis, Austria =

Vitis
- Municipality
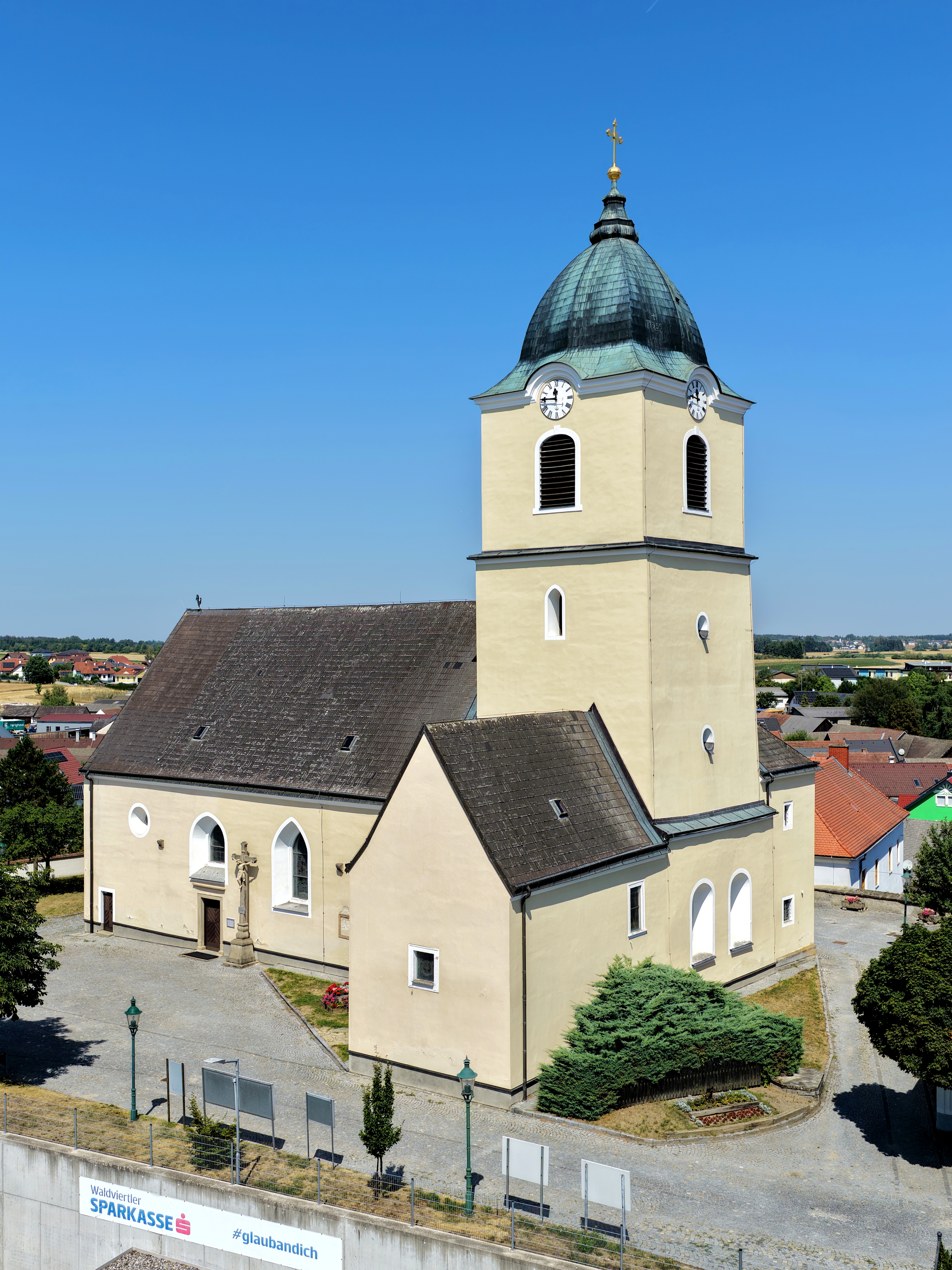
- Vitis parish church

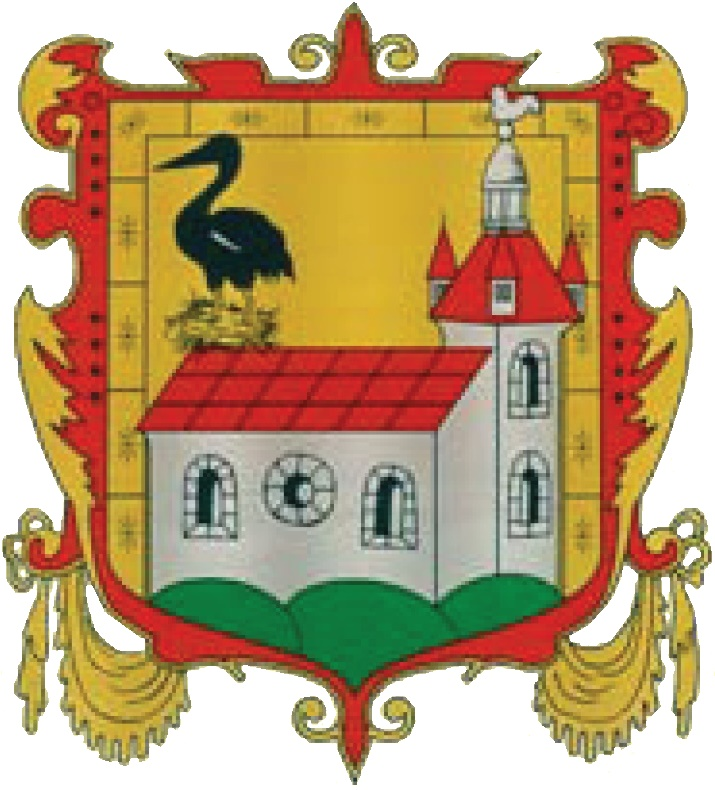
- Coat of arms

- Location within Austria Vitis (Austria)
- Coordinates: 48°45′00″N 15°10′00″E
- Country: Austria
- State: Lower Austria
- District: Waidhofen an der Thaya

Government
  - Mayor: Anette Töpfl (ÖVP)

Area
  - Total: 55.51 km^{2} (21.43 sq mi)
- Elevation: 530 m (1,740 ft)

Population (2018-01-01)
  - Total: 2,678
  - Density: 48.24/km^{2} (125.0/sq mi)
- Time zone: UTC+1 (CET)
  - Summer (DST): UTC+2 (CEST)
- Postal code: 3902
- Area code: 02841
- Vehicle registration: WT
- Website: www.vitis.at

Vitis (German pronunciation: [ˈfɪtɪs]) is a town in the district of Waidhofen an der Thaya in the Austrian state of Lower Austria.

== Population ==
Historical population
Year	Pop.	±%
1971	2,831	—
1981	2,723	−3.8%
1991	2,564	−5.8%
2001	2,575	+0.4%
