= Waidhofen an der Thaya-Land =

- Municipality
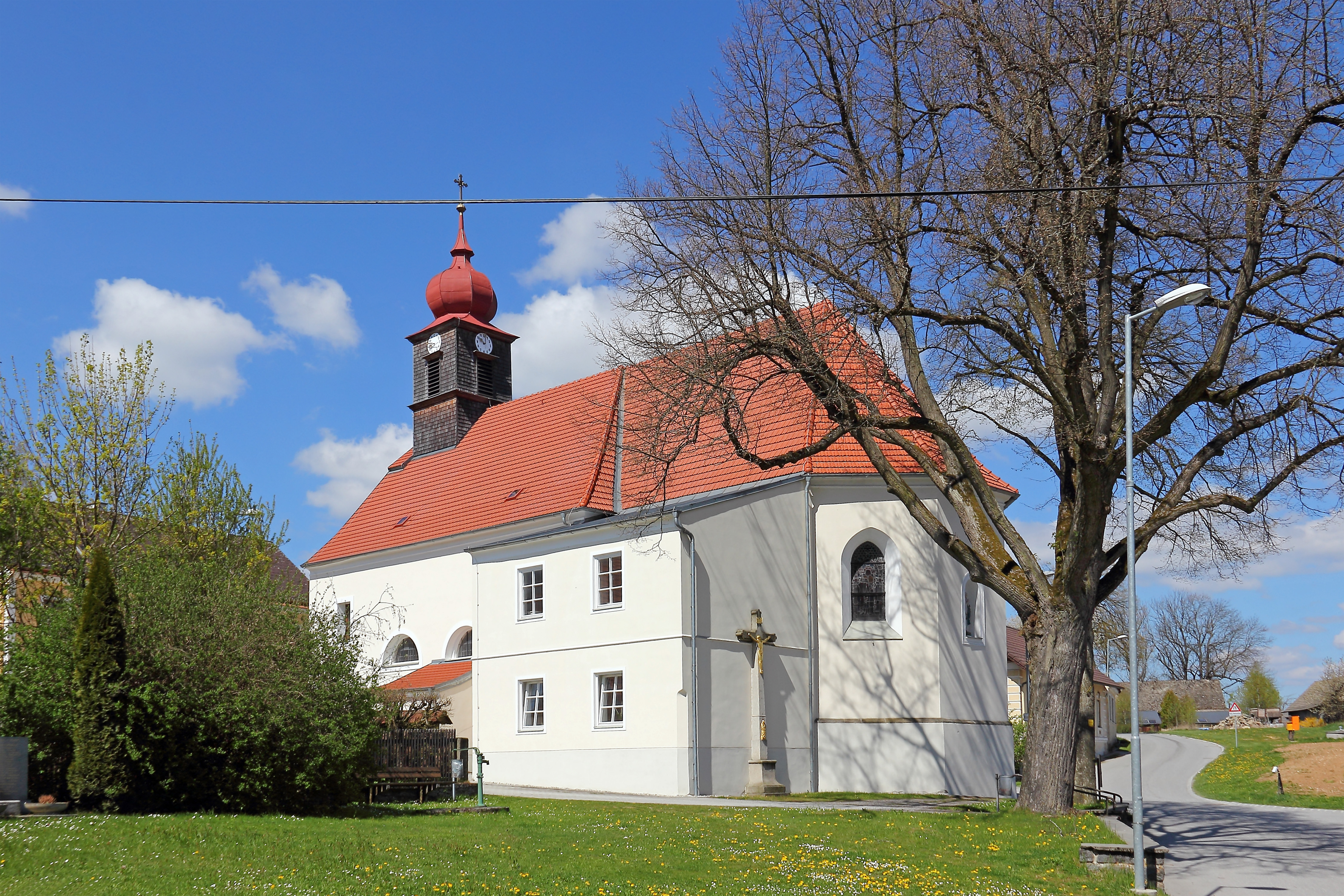
- Church of Saint Florian in Buchbach

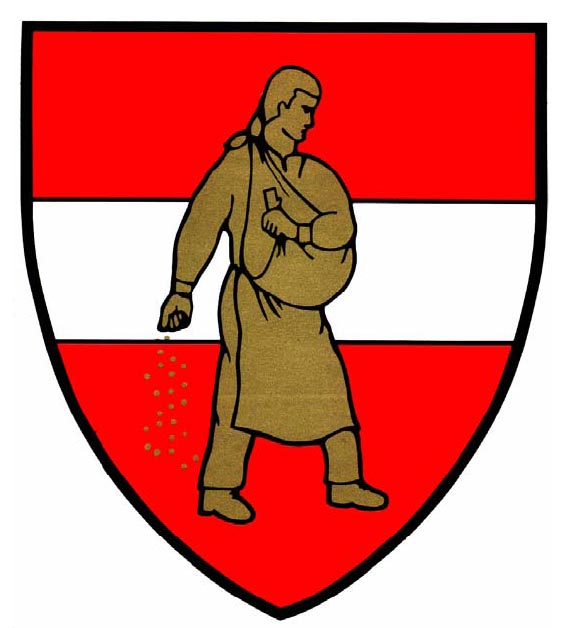
- Coat of arms

- Location within Austria
- Coordinates: 48°48′00″N 15°16′00″E
- Country: Austria
- State: Lower Austria
- District: Waidhofen an der Thaya

Government
  - Mayor: Christian Drucker (ÖVP)

Area
  - Total: 32.44 km^{2} (12.53 sq mi)
- Elevation: 481 m (1,578 ft)

Population (2018-01-01)
  - Total: 1,266
  - Density: 39.03/km^{2} (101.1/sq mi)
- Time zone: UTC+1 (CET)
  - Summer (DST): UTC+2 (CEST)
- Postal code: 3830
- Area code: 02842
- Vehicle registration: WT
- Website: www.waidhofen-thaya-land.gv.at

Waidhofen an der Thaya-Land is a municipality in the district of Waidhofen an der Thaya in the Austrian state of Lower Austria.

== Populations ==
Historical population
Year	Pop.	±%
1971	1,110	—
1981	1,127	+1.5%
1991	1,097	−2.7%
2001	1,197	+9.1%
