= Holetschek (crater) =

Lunar impact crater

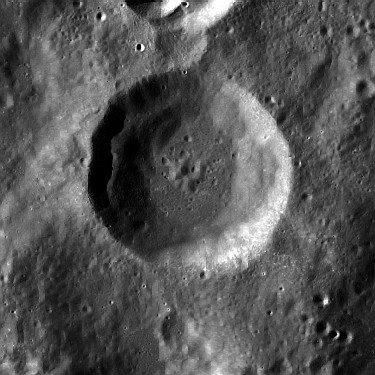
- LRO image
- Coordinates: 27.6°S 150.9°E
- Diameter: 38 km
- Depth: Unknown
- Colongitude: 209° at sunrise
- Eponym: Johann Holetschek

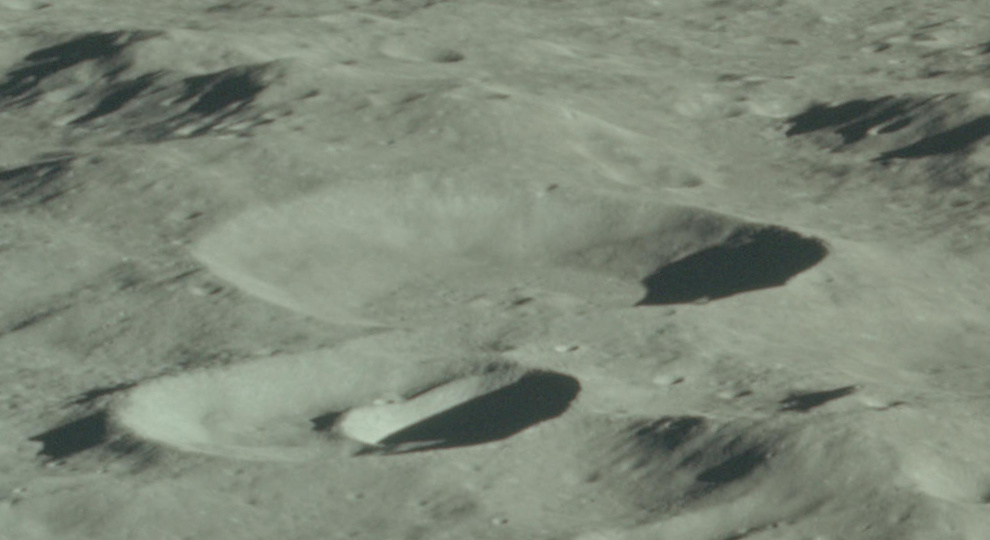
Oblique Apollo 17 image, with Holetschek Z in the foreground

Holetschek is a lunar impact crater on the far side of the Moon, to the south-southeast of the huge walled plain called Gagarin. To the east of Holetschek is the crater Sierpinski. To the west-southwest is the larger satellite crater Holetschek R.

The perimeter of this crater forms a nearly symmetric circle, with a slight outward bulge to the south-southeast. The rim is not significantly eroded, but a small craterlet is attached to the northern rim, joining it to the satellite crater Holetschek Z to the north. The inner walls are slumped in places, forming a pile of talus along the western base. The interior floor is otherwise relatively featureless.

== Satellite craters ==
By convention these features are identified on lunar maps by placing the letter on the side of the crater midpoint that is closest to Holetschek.

Holetschek	Latitude	Longitude	Diameter
N	30.2° S	150.1° E	19 km
P	30.0° S	149.5° E	16 km
R	29.0° S	147.5° E	69 km
Z	26.3° S	150.9° E	30 km
