= Barbara Holecek =

American film producer

Barbara Gullahorn Holecek (11 October 1942 – 4 August 2017) was an American anthropological documentary producer and director who produced for NOVA, PBS, UNICEF, and other groups.

She earned an undergraduate degree at the University of California, Berkeley, and a master's degree in documentary filmmaking at UCLA.

Her most famous work is Umm Kulthum: A Voice Like Egypt, a 1996 documentary of the life of the Egyptian superstar singer Umm Kulthum narrated by Omar Sharif, which she co-produced. She also directed Hunters of the Seal in 1977 and produced Papua New Guinea: Anthropology on Trial in 1983.

Holocek died on 4 August 2017.
