= Karlstein an der Thaya =

- Municipality
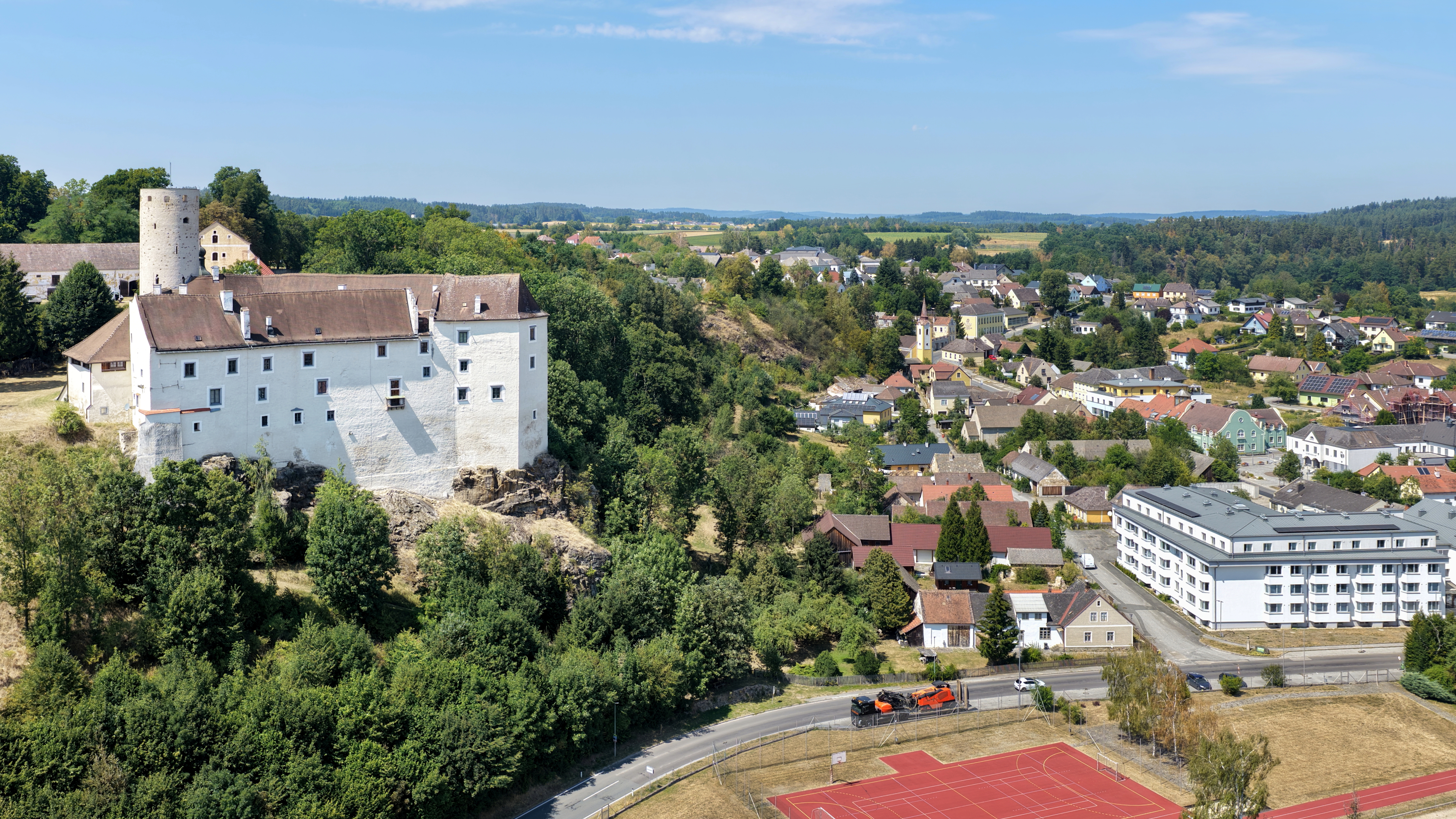
- Aerial view of Karlstein an der Thaya

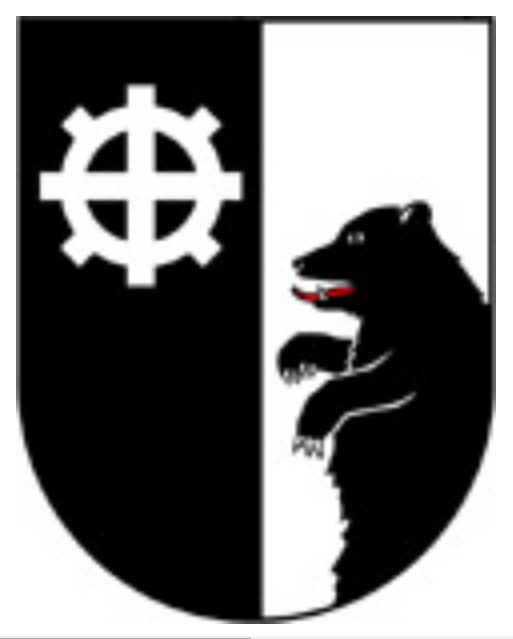
- Coat of arms

- Location within Austria
- Coordinates: 48°53′00″N 15°24′00″E
- Country: Austria
- State: Lower Austria
- District: Waidhofen an der Thaya

Government
  - Mayor: Siegfried Walch (ÖVP)

Area
  - Total: 48.87 km^{2} (18.87 sq mi)
- Elevation: 442 m (1,450 ft)

Population (2018-01-01)
  - Total: 1,468
  - Density: 30.04/km^{2} (77.80/sq mi)
- Time zone: UTC+1 (CET)
  - Summer (DST): UTC+2 (CEST)
- Postal code: 3822
- Area code: 02844
- Vehicle registration: WT
- Website: www.karlstein-thaya.gv.at

Karlstein an der Thaya is a municipality and market town in the district of Waidhofen an der Thaya in the Austrian state of Lower Austria.

== Population ==
Historical population
Year	Pop.	±%
1971	1,948	—
1981	1,723	−11.6%
1991	1,596	−7.4%
2001	1,586	−0.6%

== Local council ==
Elections were held in 2015 with the following results:

- ÖVP 13 seats
- SPÖ 4 seats
- FPÖ 2 seats
