= Dobersberg =

- Municipality
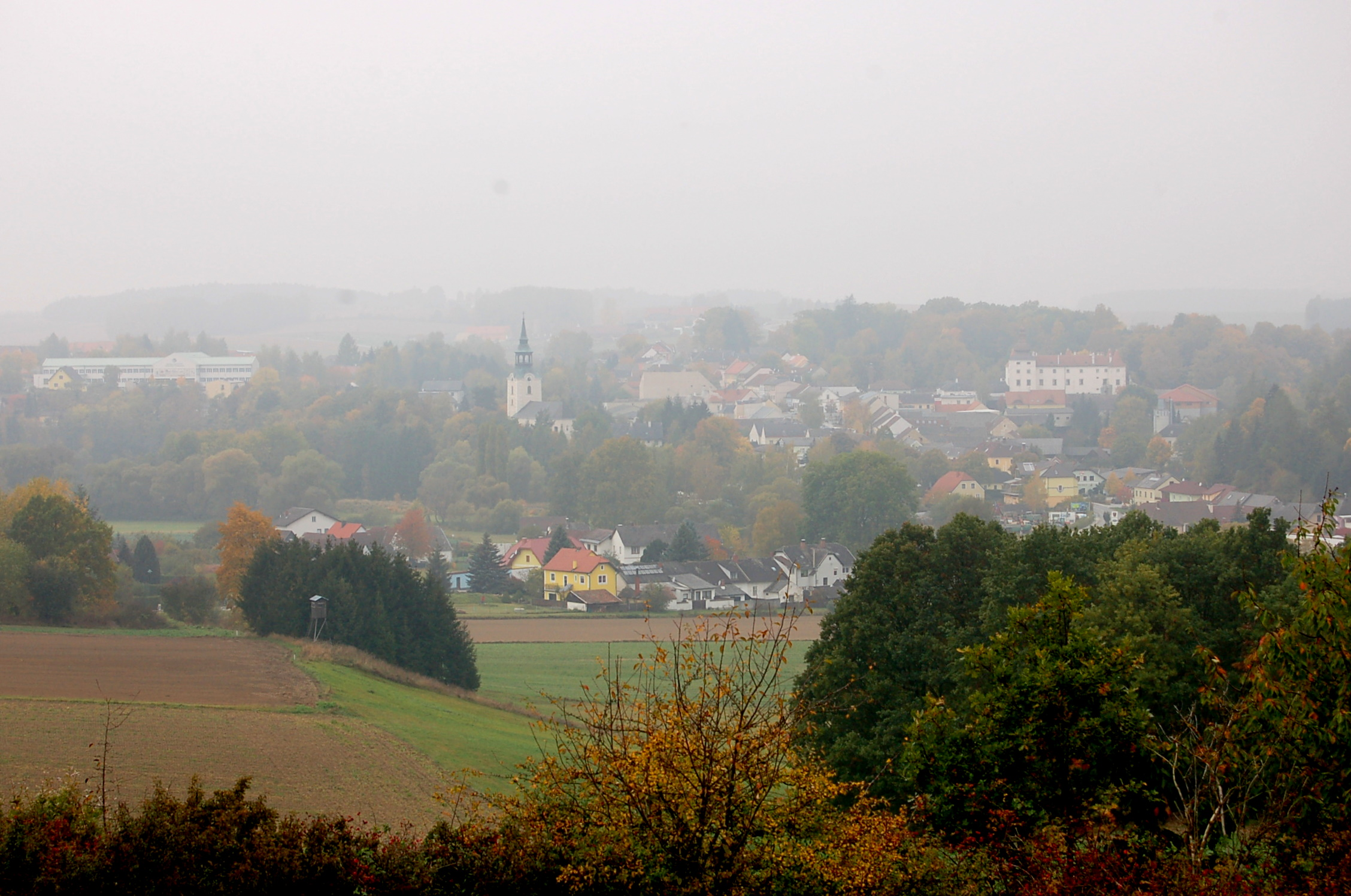
- Dobersberg seen from the east

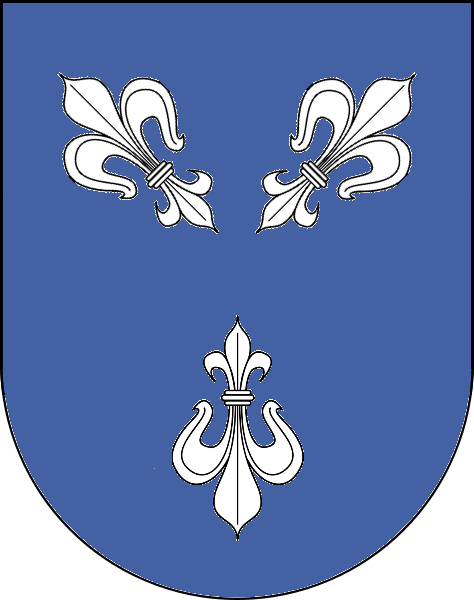
- Coat of arms

- Location within Austria
- Coordinates: 48°54′54″N 15°19′15″E
- Country: Austria
- State: Lower Austria
- District: Waidhofen an der Thaya

Government
  - Mayor: Lambert Handl (ÖVP)

Area
  - Total: 47.59 km^{2} (18.37 sq mi)
- Elevation: 465 m (1,526 ft)

Population (2018-01-01)
  - Total: 1,618
  - Density: 34.00/km^{2} (88.06/sq mi)
- Time zone: UTC+1 (CET)
  - Summer (DST): UTC+2 (CEST)
- Postal code: 3843
- Area code: 02843
- Vehicle registration: WT
- Website: www.dobersberg.gv.at

Dobersberg is a municipality in the district of Waidhofen an der Thaya in the Austrian state of Lower Austria.

== Population ==
Historical population
| Year | Pop. | ±% |
|---|---|---|
| 1971 | 1,935 | — |
| 1981 | 1,897 | −2.0% |
| 1991 | 1,801 | −5.1% |
| 2001 | 1,743 | −3.2% |
