= Sankt Stefan-Afiesl =

Coordinates: 48°34′53″N 14°07′46″E

Sankt Stefan-Afiesl is a municipality in the Rohrbach District of Upper Austria. As of 1 January 2019, its population is 1100.

The municipality was formed on 1 May 2019 by merging two municipalities, Sankt Stefan am Walde and Afiesl.

== Localities ==
The municipality includes the following populated places (Ortschaften), with population as of 1 January 2019:

- Dambergschlag (70)
- Gmain (5)
- Haid (38)
- Herrnschlag (88)
- Innenschlag (28)
- Köckendorf (84)
- Neuschlag (112)
- Oberafiesl (79)
- Obereben (17)
- Oberriedl (79)
- Preßleithen (18)
- Raiden (74)
- Sankt Stefan am Walde (186)
- Unterafiesl (38)
- Untereben (34)
- Unterriedl (150)
