= Afiesl =

- Former municipality
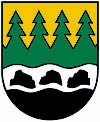
- Coat of arms

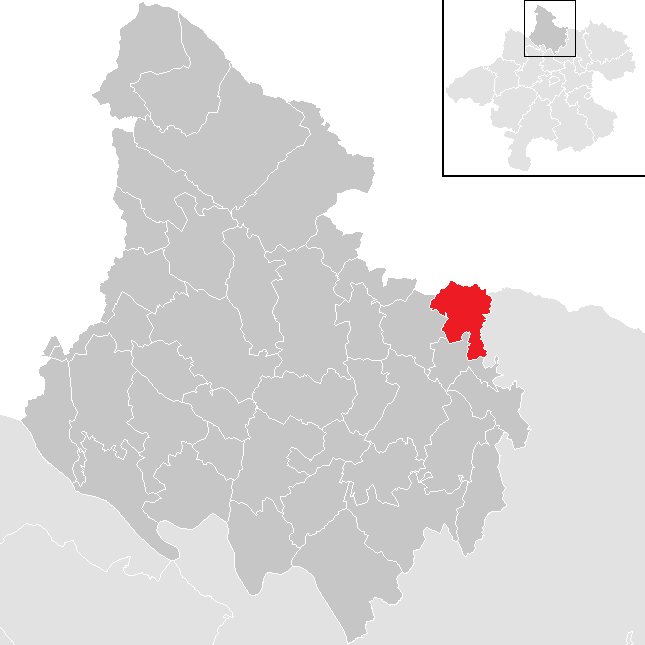
- Location in the district

- Location within Austria
- Coordinates: 48°34′53″N 14°08′24″E
- Country: Austria
- State: Upper Austria
- District: Rohrbach

Area
  - Total: 13.56 km^{2} (5.24 sq mi)
- Elevation: 714 m (2,343 ft)

Population (2018-01-01)
  - Total: 394
  - Density: 29.1/km^{2} (75.3/sq mi)
- Time zone: UTC+1 (CET)
  - Summer (DST): UTC+2 (CEST)
- Postal code: 4184
- Area code: 07216
- Vehicle registration: RO

Afiesl was a municipality in the district of Rohrbach in the Austrian state of Upper Austria. On January 1, 2019 Afiesl municipality was merged with Sankt Stefan am Walde to form Sankt Stefan-Afiesl municipality.

== Population ==
Historical population
Year	Pop.	±%
1869	677	—
1880	642	−5.2%
1890	610	−5.0%
1900	578	−5.2%
1910	569	−1.6%
1923	527	−7.4%
1934	556	+5.5%
1939	533	−4.1%
1951	526	−1.3%
1961	484	−8.0%
1971	411	−15.1%
1981	420	+2.2%
1991	419	−0.2%
2001	424	+1.2%
2011	408	−3.8%
2017	385	−5.6%
