= Sankt Stefan am Walde =

- Former municipality
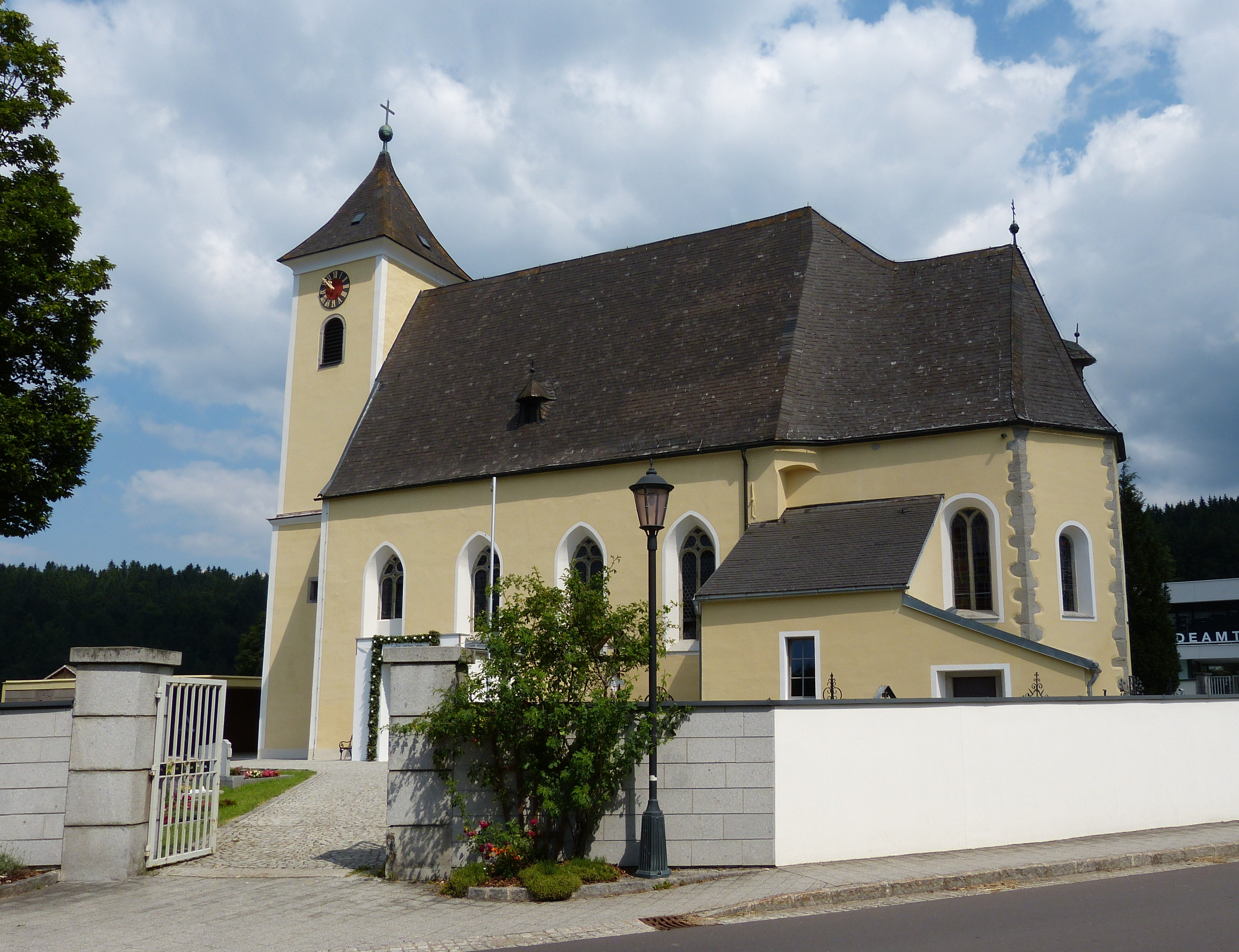

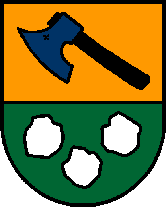
- Coat of arms

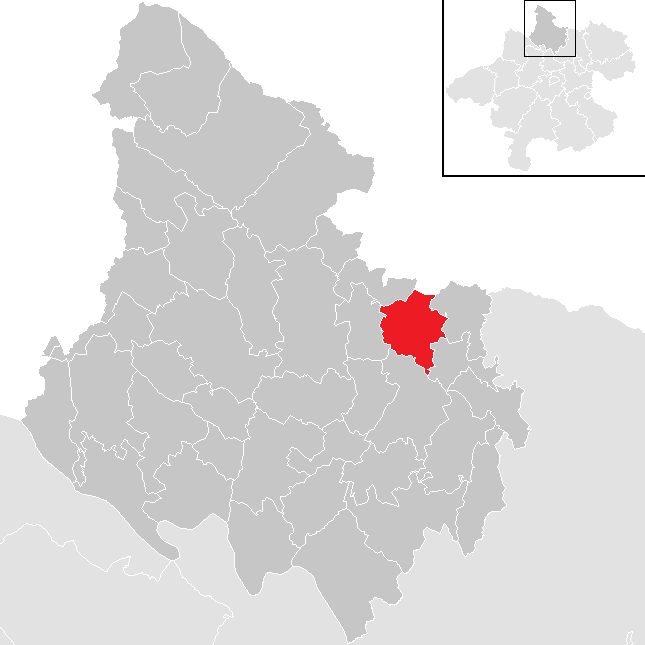
- Location in the district

- Location within Austria
- Coordinates: 48°34′06″N 14°06′08″E
- Country: Austria
- State: Upper Austria
- District: Rohrbach

Area
  - Total: 16.08 km^{2} (6.21 sq mi)
- Elevation: 805 m (2,641 ft)

Population (2018-01-01)
  - Total: 804
  - Density: 50.0/km^{2} (129/sq mi)
- Time zone: UTC+1 (CET)
  - Summer (DST): UTC+2 (CEST)
- Postal code: 4170
- Area code: 07216
- Vehicle registration: RO

Sankt Stefan am Walde was a municipality in the district of Rohrbach in the Austrian state of Upper Austria. On January 1, 2019 Sankt Stefan am Walde municipality was merged with Afiesl to form Sankt Stefan-Afiesl municipality.

== Population ==
Historical population
Year	Pop.	±%
1869	1,035	—
1880	963	−7.0%
1890	933	−3.1%
1900	867	−7.1%
1910	825	−4.8%
1923	783	−5.1%
1934	840	+7.3%
1939	857	+2.0%
1951	820	−4.3%
1961	722	−12.0%
1971	797	+10.4%
1981	853	+7.0%
1991	853	+0.0%
2001	843	−1.2%
2011	819	−2.8%
2017	804	−1.8%
