= 1930–31 Rochdale A.F.C. season =

English football club season

Rochdale
1930–31 season
- Manager: Will Cameron
- Stadium: Spotland Stadium
- Football League Third Division North: 21st
- FA Cup: 1st Round
- Top goalscorer: League: Tom Tippett (18); All: Tom Tippett (18)

The 1930–31 season was Rochdale A.F.C.'s 24th in existence and their 10th in the Football League Third Division North.

== Squad Statistics ==
=== Appearances and goals ===
No.	Pos	Nat	Player	Total		Division 3 North		FA Cup	
No.	Pos	Nat	Player	Apps	Goals	Apps	Goals	Apps	Goals
	GK	(England) ENG	Jack Prince	16	0	15	0	1	0
	DF	(England) ENG	Tom Watson	19	0	18	0	1	0
	DF	(England) ENG	Dougie Oliver	20	0	20	0	0	0
	MF	(Wales) WAL	Idris Williams	34	2	34	2	0	0
	FW	(England) ENG	Jack Barber	36	0	35	0	1	0
	MF	(Scotland) SCO	George Grierson	32	0	31	0	1	0
	MF	(England) ENG	George Stott	31	10	31	10	0	0
	FW	(England) ENG	Billy Bertram	21	3	20	3	1	0
	FW	(England) ENG	Tom Tippett	41	18	40	18	1	0
	FW	(Wales) WAL	Harry Lewis	21	6	20	6	1	0
	FW	(England) ENG	Frank Hargreaves	9	3	9	3	0	0
	DF	(England) ENG	Thomas Corcoran	25	0	24	0	1	0
	MF	(England) ENG	Albert Latham	8	1	8	1	0	0
	DF	(Republic of Ireland) IRL	Jack Everest	16	2	16	2	0	0
	MF	(England) ENG	Percy Hellyer	1	0	1	0	0	0
	FW	(England) ENG	Joe Craddock	35	10	34	10	1	0
	FW	(England) ENG	Fred Fitton	1	0	1	0	0	0
	FW	(Scotland) SCO	David Cowan	25	3	24	2	1	1
	MF	(England) ENG	Fred Appleyard	4	0	3	0	1	0
	DF	(England) ENG	William Blackburn	3	0	3	0	0	0
	MF	(England) ENG	Harry Platt	3	0	3	0	0	0
	FW	(England) ENG	George Turnbull	10	2	10	2	0	0
	MF	(England) ENG	George Ward	12	0	12	0	0	0
	MF	(England) ENG	Thomas Warburton	2	0	2	0	0	0
	GK	(Wales) WAL	Thomas Lynch	27	0	27	0	0	0
	DF	(England) ENG	Harry Bruce	2	0	2	0	0	0
	DF	(Scotland) SCO	Adam Plunkett	6	0	6	0	0	0
	MF	(England) ENG	Austin Trippier	9	1	9	1	0	0
	MF	(England) ENG	Francis Chorlton	3	0	3	0	0	0
	MF	(England) ENG	Henry Martin	1	0	1	0	0	0
	FW		George Lillywhite	0	0	0	0	0	0

Squad Statistics (Non-competitive)

=== Appearances and goals (non-competitive) ===
No.	Pos	Nat	Player	Total		Lancashire Cup		Manchester Cup	
No.	Pos	Nat	Player	Apps	Goals	Apps	Goals	Apps	Goals
	GK	(England) ENG	Jack Prince	0	0	0	0	0	0
	DF	(England) ENG	Tom Watson	2	0	1	0	1	0
	DF	(England) ENG	Dougie Oliver	1	0	0	0	1	0
	MF	(Wales) WAL	Idris Williams	4	0	2	0	2	0
	FW	(England) ENG	Jack Barber	3	0	2	0	1	0
	MF	(Scotland) SCO	George Grierson	4	0	2	0	2	0
	MF	(England) ENG	George Stott	3	1	2	1	1	0
	FW	(England) ENG	Billy Bertram	2	1	2	1	0	0
	FW	(England) ENG	Tom Tippett	3	0	2	0	1	0
	FW	(Wales) WAL	Harry Lewis	1	0	1	0	0	0
	FW	(England) ENG	Frank Hargreaves	1	1	0	0	1	1
	DF	(England) ENG	Thomas Corcoran	2	0	0	0	2	0
	MF	(England) ENG	Albert Latham	1	0	0	0	1	0
	DF	(Republic of Ireland) IRL	Jack Everest	1	0	1	0	0	0
	MF	(England) ENG	Percy Hellyer	0	0	0	0	0	0
	FW	(England) ENG	Joe Craddock	4	0	2	0	2	0
	FW	(England) ENG	Fred Fitton	1	0	1	0	0	0
	FW	(Scotland) SCO	David Cowan	1	0	0	0	1	0
	MF	(England) ENG	Fred Appleyard	1	0	1	0	0	0
	DF	(England) ENG	William Blackburn	0	0	0	0	0	0
	MF	(England) ENG	Harry Platt	0	0	0	0	0	0
	FW	(England) ENG	George Turnbull	1	0	0	0	1	0
	MF	(England) ENG	George Ward	0	0	0	0	0	0
	MF	(England) ENG	Thomas Warburton	0	0	0	0	0	0
	GK	(Wales) WAL	Thomas Lynch	4	0	2	0	2	0
	DF	(England) ENG	Harry Bruce	1	0	0	0	1	0
	DF	(Scotland) SCO	Adam Plunkett	0	0	0	0	0	0
	MF	(England) ENG	Austin Trippier	1	0	0	0	1	0
	MF	(England) ENG	Francis Chorlton	1	0	0	0	1	0
	MF	(England) ENG	Henry Martin	0	0	0	0	0	0
	FW		George Lillywhite	1	0	0	0	1	0

== Final league table ==
Pos	Team	Pld	W	D	L	GF	GA	GAv	Pts	Promotion or relegation
18	Crewe Alexandra	42	14	6	22	66	93	0.710	34	
19	New Brighton	42	13	7	22	49	76	0.645	33	
20	Hartlepools United	42	12	6	24	67	86	0.779	30	
21	Rochdale	42	12	6	24	62	107	0.579	30	Re-elected
22	Nelson (R)	42	6	7	29	43	113	0.381	19	Failed re-election and demoted

Source: rsssf.com
(R) Relegated

== Competitions ==
=== Football League Third Division North ===
30 August 1930 1	Rochdale	5–4	Nelson	Rochdale
	Hargreaves; Tippett; Stott; Dixon (o.g.)	Report	Bate; Carmedy	Stadium: Spotland Stadium; Attendance: 4822

1 September 1930 2	Rochdale	2–3	Chesterfield	Rochdale
	Stott; Everest	Report	Taylor; Lee	Stadium: Spotland Stadium; Attendance: 4384

6 September 1930 3	Crewe Alexandra	3–1	Rochdale	Crewe
	Owen; Millington; Watson (o.g.)	Report	Latham	Stadium: Gresty Road; Attendance: 3635

8 September 1930 4	Barrow	0–0	Rochdale	Barrow-in-Furness
		Report		Stadium: Holker Street; Attendance: 6873

13 September 1930 5	Rochdale	4–3	Wrexham	Rochdale
	Bertram; Craddock; Stott; Tippett	Report	Mustard; Bamford	Stadium: Spotland Stadium; Attendance: 5073

15 September 1930 6	Rochdale	4–2	Barrow	Rochdale
	Stott; Tippett	Report	Moon; Millar	Stadium: Spotland Stadium; Attendance: 3957

20 September 1930 7	Tranmere Rovers	7–3	Rochdale	Birkenhead
	Dixon; Kennedy; Watts; Everest (o.g.)	Report	Hargreaves; Lewis	Stadium: Prenton Park; Attendance: 5700

27 September 1930 8	Rochdale	1–3	Carlisle United	Rochdale
	Bertram	Report	Hutchison; McConnell	Stadium: Spotland Stadium; Attendance: 3165

4 October 1930 9	York City	3–0	Rochdale	York
	Fenoughty; Sharpe; Laycock	Report		Stadium: Fulfordgate; Attendance: 4308

11 October 1930 10	Rochdale	6–1	Rotherham United	Rochdale
	Everest; Lewis; Craddock; Tippett; Bertram	Report	Hick	Stadium: Spotland Stadium; Attendance: 3480

18 October 1930 11	Rochdale	0–4	Wigan Borough	Rochdale
		Report	Jepson (pen.)	Stadium: Spotland Stadium; Attendance: 6975

25 October 1930 12	Darlington	1–1	Rochdale	Darlington
	Wellock	Report	Craddock	Stadium: Feethams; Attendance: 3234

1 November 1930 13	Rochdale	4–2	Lincoln City	Rochdale
	Tippett; Stott; Craddock	Report	Lax; Kitching	Stadium: Spotland Stadium; Attendance: 4307

8 November 1930 14	Hull City	3–1	Rochdale	Hull
	Barber (o.g.); Alexander	Report	Stott	Stadium: Anlaby Road; Attendance: 7719

15 November 1930 15	Rochdale	3–5	Doncaster Rovers	Rochdale
	Lewis	Report	Bott; Smith; Gladwin	Stadium: Spotland Stadium; Attendance: 2985

22 November 1930 16	Gateshead	0–2	Rochdale	Gateshead
		Report	Lewis; Tippett	Stadium: Redheugh Park; Attendance: 1129

6 December 1930 17	New Brighton	2–1	Rochdale	New Brighton
	Stevens	Report	Williams	Stadium: Sandheys Park; Attendance: 2369

20 December 1930 18	Hartlepools United	4–0	Rochdale	Hartlepool
	Pedwell; Simmons; J. Mordue; T. Mordue	Report		Stadium: Victoria Park; Attendance: 3083

25 December 1930 19	Southport	4–0	Rochdale	Southport
	Cowen; Waterson; Wilson	Report		Stadium: Haig Avenue; Attendance: 6157

26 December 1930 20	Rochdale	0–4	Southport	Rochdale
		Report	Waterson; Wilson; Robinson	Stadium: Spotland Stadium; Attendance: 1934

27 December 1930 21	Nelson	0–0	Rochdale	Nelson
		Report		Stadium: Seedhill; Attendance: 2774

1 January 1931 22	Accrington Stanley	2–3	Rochdale	Accrington
	Broome; Abel	Report	Craddock; Tippett	Stadium: Peel Park; Attendance: 3724

3 January 1931 23	Rochdale	1–0	Crewe Alexandra	Rochdale
	Stott	Report		Stadium: Spotland Stadium; Attendance: 2326

10 January 1931 24	Rochdale	1–0	Stockport County	Rochdale
	Tippett	Report		Stadium: Spotland Stadium; Attendance: 2553

17 January 1931 25	Wrexham	1–1	Rochdale	Wrexham
	Taylor	Report	Stott	Stadium: Racecourse Ground; Attendance: 4405

24 January 1931 26	Rochdale	1–3	Tranmere Rovers	Rochdale
	Turnbull	Report	Dixon; Meston	Stadium: Spotland Stadium; Attendance: 3694

31 January 1931 27	Carlisle United	7–1	Rochdale	Carlisle
	McConnell; Armes; Hutchison; Coulthard	Report	Turnbull	Stadium: Brunton Park; Attendance: 2224

7 February 1931 28	Rochdale	2–2	York City	Rochdale
	Craddock	Report	Cowie; Evans	Stadium: Spotland Stadium; Attendance: 2577

14 February 1931 29	Rotherham United	1–3	Rochdale	Rotherham
	Hick	Report	Cowan; Tippett; Craddock	Stadium: Millmoor; Attendance: 5047

16 February 1931 30	Rochdale	2–3	Halifax Town	Rochdale
	Tippett	Report	Betteridge; Bain	Stadium: Spotland Stadium; Attendance: 1118

21 February 1931 31	Wigan Borough	3–0	Rochdale	Wigan
	Jepson	Report		Stadium: Springfield Park; Attendance: 3364

7 March 1931 32	Lincoln City	5–0	Rochdale	Lincoln
	Dinsdale; Cartwright; Pegg	Report		Stadium: Sincil Bank; Attendance: 6040

14 March 1931 33	Rochdale	1–0	Hull City	Rochdale
	Goldsmith (o.g.)	Report		Stadium: Spotland Stadium; Attendance: 3465

21 March 1931 34	Doncaster Rovers	4–0	Rochdale	Doncaster
	Vickers; Smith; Atkin	Report		Stadium: Belle Vue; Attendance: 2997

28 March 1931 35	Rochdale	0–1	Gateshead	Rochdale
		Report	McNaughton	Stadium: Spotland Stadium; Attendance: 1555

3 April 1931 36	Rochdale	1–6	Accrington Stanley	Rochdale
	Williams	Report	Broome; Agar; Riley	Stadium: Spotland Stadium; Attendance: 3024

4 April 1931 37	Stockport County	2–2	Rochdale	Stockport
	Lincoln	Report	Cowan; Tippett	Stadium: Edgeley Park; Attendance: 5046

6 April 1931 38	Chesterfield	4–1	Rochdale	Chesterfield
	Pynegar; Binks	Report	Tippett	Stadium: Saltergate Recreation Ground; Attendance: 5089

11 April 1931 39	Rochdale	2–0	New Brighton	Rochdale
	Tippett; Trippier	Report		Stadium: Spotland Stadium; Attendance: 1855

18 April 1931 40	Halifax Town	1–0	Rochdale	Halifax
	McFarlane	Report		Stadium: The Shay; Attendance: 2875

21 April 1931 41	Rochdale	1–2	Darlington	Rochdale
	Tippett	Report	Mitchell; Wellock	Stadium: Spotland Stadium; Attendance: 1573

25 April 1931 42	Rochdale	1–2	Hartlepools United	Rochdale
	Tippett	Report	Thompson; Simmons	Stadium: Spotland Stadium; Attendance: 1586

=== FA Cup ===
29 November 1930 1	Rochdale	1–2	Doncaster Rovers	Rochdale
	Cowan	Report	Bott; Smith	Stadium: Spotland Stadium; Attendance: 5526

=== Lancashire Cup ===
30 September 1930 2	Rochdale	2–1	Bury	Rochdale
	Stott; Bertram		Goal	Stadium: Spotland Stadium; Attendance: 1700

11 November 1930 3	Rochdale	0–1	Manchester United	Rochdale
			Goal	Stadium: Spotland Stadium; Attendance: 1950

=== Manchester Cup ===
4 March 1931 3	Manchester City	0–1	Rochdale	Manchester
			Hargreaves	Stadium: Maine Road; Attendance: 2300

15 April 1931 SF	Manchester United	2–0	Rochdale	Manchester
	Goal			Stadium: Old Trafford
