= 1928–29 Rochdale A.F.C. season =

English football club season

Rochdale
1928–29 season
- Manager: Jack Peart
- Stadium: Spotland Stadium
- Football League Third Division North: 17th
- FA Cup: 1st Round
- Top goalscorer: League: Jack Milsom (25); All: Jack Milsom (26)

The 1928–29 season was Rochdale A.F.C.'s 22nd in existence and their 8th in the Football League Third Division North.

== Squad Statistics ==
=== Appearances and goals ===
| No. | Pos | Nat | Player | Total | | Division 3 North | | FA Cup | |
| No. | Pos | Nat | Player | Apps | Goals | Apps | Goals | Apps | Goals |
|---|---|---|---|---|---|---|---|---|---|
| | GK | (Wales) WAL | Jackie Mittell | 28 | 0 | 27 | 0 | 1 | 0 |
| | DF | (England) ENG | James Ellison | 16 | 0 | 16 | 0 | 0 | 0 |
| | DF | (England) ENG | George Lewins | 35 | 0 | 34 | 0 | 1 | 0 |
| | DF | (England) ENG | Ernie Braidwood | 10 | 0 | 10 | 0 | 0 | 0 |
| | FW | (England) ENG | Jack Barber | 37 | 2 | 36 | 2 | 1 | 0 |
| | MF | (England) ENG | Jack Hall | 41 | 0 | 40 | 0 | 1 | 0 |
| | MF | (England) ENG | Uriah Miles | 3 | 0 | 3 | 0 | 0 | 0 |
| | FW | (England) ENG | Billy Bertram | 32 | 18 | 31 | 18 | 1 | 0 |
| | FW | (England) ENG | Oswald Littler | 4 | 1 | 4 | 1 | 0 | 0 |
| | DF | (England) ENG | Walter Webster | 15 | 0 | 15 | 0 | 0 | 0 |
| | MF | (Scotland) SCO | Andy Martin | 33 | 1 | 32 | 1 | 1 | 0 |
| | FW | (England) ENG | Reg Trotman | 24 | 10 | 23 | 10 | 1 | 0 |
| | FW | (England) ENG | Jack Milsom | 41 | 26 | 40 | 25 | 1 | 1 |
| | FW | (England) ENG | Jack Brierley | 14 | 7 | 14 | 7 | 0 | 0 |
| | MF | (England) ENG | George Stott | 40 | 7 | 39 | 7 | 1 | 0 |
| | MF | (Wales) WAL | Thomas Bailey | 1 | 0 | 1 | 0 | 0 | 0 |
| | DF | (England) ENG | Tom Watson | 35 | 0 | 34 | 0 | 1 | 0 |
| | GK | (England) ENG | George Power | 3 | 0 | 3 | 0 | 0 | 0 |
| | MF | (England) ENG | Henry Martin | 28 | 4 | 27 | 3 | 1 | 1 |
| | FW | (England) ENG | Charlie Howlett | 2 | 0 | 2 | 0 | 0 | 0 |
| | FW | (England) ENG | Harry Howlett | 1 | 0 | 1 | 0 | 0 | 0 |
| | FW | (England) ENG | Eric Silverwood | 2 | 0 | 2 | 0 | 0 | 0 |
| | DF | (England) ENG | Allan Murray | 2 | 0 | 2 | 0 | 0 | 0 |
| | FW | (Wales) WAL | Harry Lewis | 10 | 4 | 10 | 4 | 0 | 0 |
| | GK | (England) ENG | Ed Robson | 12 | 0 | 12 | 0 | 0 | 0 |
| | MF | (England) ENG | Fred Appleyard | 1 | 0 | 1 | 0 | 0 | 0 |
| | MF | (England) ENG | Dick Brown | 1 | 0 | 1 | 0 | 0 | 0 |
| | MF | (England) ENG | Albert Cooke | 1 | 0 | 1 | 0 | 0 | 0 |
| | FW | (Wales) WAL | Christopher Jones | 1 | 0 | 1 | 0 | 0 | 0 |
| | | (Wales) WAL | David Halfpenny | 0 | 0 | 0 | 0 | 0 | 0 |
| | GK | | R. Oddie | 0 | 0 | 0 | 0 | 0 | 0 |
| | DF | | H. Clegg | 0 | 0 | 0 | 0 | 0 | 0 |

Squad Statistics (Non-competitive)

=== Appearances and goals (non-competitive) ===
| No. | Pos | Nat | Player | Total | | Lancashire Cup | | Manchester Cup | |
| No. | Pos | Nat | Player | Apps | Goals | Apps | Goals | Apps | Goals |
|---|---|---|---|---|---|---|---|---|---|
| | GK | (Wales) WAL | Jackie Mittell | 0 | 0 | 0 | 0 | 0 | 0 |
| | DF | (England) ENG | James Ellison | 0 | 0 | 0 | 0 | 0 | 0 |
| | DF | (England) ENG | George Lewins | 2 | 0 | 1 | 0 | 1 | 0 |
| | DF | (England) ENG | Ernie Braidwood | 0 | 0 | 0 | 0 | 0 | 0 |
| | FW | (England) ENG | Jack Barber | 2 | 0 | 1 | 0 | 1 | 0 |
| | MF | (England) ENG | Jack Hall | 2 | 0 | 1 | 0 | 1 | 0 |
| | MF | (England) ENG | Uriah Miles | 0 | 0 | 0 | 0 | 0 | 0 |
| | FW | (England) ENG | Billy Bertram | 1 | 0 | 1 | 0 | 0 | 0 |
| | FW | (England) ENG | Oswald Littler | 0 | 0 | 0 | 0 | 0 | 0 |
| | DF | (England) ENG | Walter Webster | 0 | 0 | 0 | 0 | 0 | 0 |
| | MF | (Scotland) SCO | Andy Martin | 1 | 0 | 0 | 0 | 1 | 0 |
| | FW | (England) ENG | Reg Trotman | 0 | 0 | 0 | 0 | 0 | 0 |
| | FW | (England) ENG | Jack Milsom | 2 | 2 | 1 | 0 | 1 | 2 |
| | FW | (England) ENG | Jack Brierley | 1 | 0 | 0 | 0 | 1 | 0 |
| | MF | (England) ENG | George Stott | 40 | 0 | 39 | 0 | 1 | 0 |
| | MF | (Wales) WAL | Thomas Bailey | 0 | 0 | 0 | 0 | 0 | 0 |
| | DF | (England) ENG | Tom Watson | 1 | 0 | 1 | 0 | 0 | 0 |
| | GK | (England) ENG | George Power | 1 | 0 | 1 | 0 | 0 | 0 |
| | MF | (England) ENG | Henry Martin | 2 | 1 | 1 | 1 | 1 | 0 |
| | FW | (England) ENG | Charlie Howlett | 0 | 0 | 0 | 0 | 0 | 0 |
| | FW | (England) ENG | Harry Howlett | 0 | 0 | 0 | 0 | 0 | 0 |
| | FW | (England) ENG | Eric Silverwood | 0 | 0 | 0 | 0 | 0 | 0 |
| | DF | (England) ENG | Allan Murray | 0 | 0 | 0 | 0 | 0 | 0 |
| | FW | (Wales) WAL | Harry Lewis | 1 | 0 | 0 | 0 | 1 | 0 |
| | GK | (England) ENG | Ed Robson | 0 | 0 | 0 | 0 | 0 | 0 |
| | MF | (England) ENG | Fred Appleyard | 0 | 0 | 0 | 0 | 0 | 0 |
| | MF | (England) ENG | Dick Brown | 0 | 0 | 0 | 0 | 0 | 0 |
| | MF | (England) ENG | Albert Cooke | 0 | 0 | 0 | 0 | 0 | 0 |
| | FW | (Wales) WAL | Christopher Jones | 0 | 0 | 0 | 0 | 0 | 0 |
| | | (Wales) WAL | David Halfpenny | 1 | 0 | 1 | 0 | 0 | 0 |
| | GK | | R. Oddie | 1 | 0 | 0 | 0 | 1 | 0 |
| | DF | | H. Clegg | 1 | 0 | 0 | 0 | 1 | 0 |

=== Final league table ===
| Pos | Team | Pld | W | D | L | GF | GA | GAv | Pts |
|---|---|---|---|---|---|---|---|---|---|
| 15 | Nelson | 42 | 17 | 5 | 20 | 77 | 90 | 0.856 | 39 |
| 16 | Rotherham United | 42 | 15 | 9 | 18 | 60 | 77 | 0.779 | 39 |
| 17 | Rochdale | 42 | 13 | 10 | 19 | 79 | 96 | 0.823 | 36 |
| 18 | Accrington Stanley | 42 | 13 | 8 | 21 | 68 | 82 | 0.829 | 34 |
| 19 | Darlington | 42 | 13 | 7 | 22 | 64 | 88 | 0.727 | 33 |

Source: rsssf.com

== Competitions ==
=== Football League Third Division North ===
| 25 August 1928 1 | Rochdale | 1–3 | Doncaster Rovers | Rochdale |
| | Bertram | Report | Longden; T. Keetley; Tippett | Stadium: Spotland Stadium; Attendance: 4275 |

| 27 August 1928 2 | Barrow | 3–3 | Rochdale | Barrow-in-Furness |
| | Lewins (o.g.); MacDonald; Parsons | Report | Trotman; Brierley; Milsom | Stadium: Holker Street; Attendance: 7660 |

| 1 September 1928 3 | Ashington | 2–1 | Rochdale | Ashington |
| | Johnson | Report | Martin | Stadium: Portland Park; Attendance: 3244 |

| 4 September 1928 4 | Rochdale | 4–2 | Barrow | Rochdale |
| | Trotman; Brierley; Stott; Milsom | Report | Parsons; Watson | Stadium: Spotland Stadium; Attendance: 3668 |

| 8 September 1928 5 | Rochdale | 1–2 | South Shields Athletic | Rochdale |
| | Stott | Report | Parker | Stadium: Spotland Stadium; Attendance: 6913 |

| 15 September 1928 6 | Nelson | 3–0 | Rochdale | Nelson |
| | Radford; Wilkinson; Wilson (pen.) | Report | | Stadium: Seedhill; Attendance: 6715 |

| 22 September 1928 7 | Rochdale | 5–0 | Darlington | Rochdale |
| | Trotman; Stott; Milsom | Report | | Stadium: Spotland Stadium; Attendance: 4990 |

| 29 September 1928 8 | Southport | 1–1 | Rochdale | Southport |
| | Goal | Report | Milsom | Stadium: Haig Avenue; Attendance: 4861 |

| 6 October 1928 9 | Rochdale | 0–0 | Wigan Borough | Rochdale |
| | | Report | | Stadium: Spotland Stadium; Attendance: 5227 |

| 13 October 1928 10 | Rochdale | 4–2 | New Brighton | Rochdale |
| | Milsom; Trotman; Martin | Report | Cowper; Whewell | Stadium: Spotland Stadium; Attendance: 5096 |

| 20 October 1928 11 | Crewe Alexandra | 1–1 | Rochdale | Crewe |
| | Jones | Report | Bertram | Stadium: Gresty Road; Attendance: 3493 |

| 27 October 1928 12 | Rochdale | 5–1 | Tranmere Rovers | Rochdale |
| | Bertram; Trotman; Milsom | Report | Littlehales | Stadium: Spotland Stadium; Attendance: 4691 |

| 3 November 1928 13 | Stockport County | 4–0 | Rochdale | Stockport |
| | Fielding; Everest; Tompkinson; Burgess | Report | | Stadium: Edgeley Park; Attendance: 11661 |

| 10 November 1928 14 | Rochdale | 2–2 | Halifax Town | Rochdale |
| | Barber; Milsom | Report | Bell; Coleman | Stadium: Spotland Stadium; Attendance: 2038 |

| 17 November 1928 15 | Lincoln City | 2–0 | Rochdale | Lincoln |
| | Pegg; Gorringe | Report | | Stadium: Sincil Bank; Attendance: 5586 |

| 1 December 1928 16 | Accrington Stanley | 2–2 | Rochdale | Accrington |
| | Armstrong (pen.); McLaughlan | Report | Bertram; Milsom | Stadium: Peel Park; Attendance: 4711 |

| 8 December 1928 17 | Rochdale | 7–4 | Hartlepools United | Rochdale |
| | Stott; Brierley; Bertram; Martin | Report | Mason; Briggs; Richardson | Stadium: Spotland Stadium; Attendance: 3017 |

| 15 December 1928 18 | Carlisle United | 4–2 | Rochdale | Carlisle |
| | Cooper; McConnell; Agar | Report | Stott; Barber | Stadium: Brunton Park; Attendance: 5838 |

| 22 December 1928 19 | Rochdale | 2–1 | Rotherham United | Rochdale |
| | Bertram | Report | Atkinson | Stadium: Spotland Stadium; Attendance: 2120 |

| 25 December 1928 20 | Rochdale | 4–4 | Wrexham | Rochdale |
| | Milsom; Trotman; Bertram | Report | Mays; Hudson; Longmuir (pen.); Graham | Stadium: Spotland Stadium; Attendance: 7608 |

| 26 December 1928 21 | Wrexham | 3–0 | Rochdale | Wrexham |
| | Longmuir; Gunson; Mays | Report | | Stadium: Racecourse Ground; Attendance: 10877 |

| 29 December 1928 22 | Doncaster Rovers | 4–2 | Rochdale | Doncaster |
| | Bott; Keetley; Patterson | Report | Brierley; Littler | Stadium: Belle Vue; Attendance: 4191 |

| 5 January 1929 23 | Rochdale | 5–0 | Ashington | Rochdale |
| | Milsom; Bertram; Martin | Report | | Stadium: Spotland Stadium; Attendance: 2464 |

| 12 January 1929 24 | Rochdale | 4–0 | Carlisle United | Rochdale |
| | Milsom; Trotman; Bertram | Report | | Stadium: Spotland Stadium; Attendance: 5115 |

| 19 January 1929 25 | South Shields Athletic | 5–2 | Rochdale | South Shields |
| | Kennedy; Parker; Stevenson | Report | Milsom; Stott | Stadium: Horsley Hill; Attendance: 3900 |

| 26 January 1929 26 | Rochdale | 2–1 | Nelson | Rochdale |
| | Milsom; Bertram | Report | Halliwell | Stadium: Spotland Stadium; Attendance: 4902 |

| 2 February 1929 27 | Darlington | 5–3 | Rochdale | Darlington |
| | Mountford; Eden; Lewins (o.g.) | Report | Bertram; Stott | Stadium: Feethams; Attendance: 2452 |

| 9 February 1929 28 | Rochdale | 1–1 | Southport | Rochdale |
| | Trotman | Report | Valentine | Stadium: Spotland Stadium; Attendance: 3369 |

| 16 February 1929 29 | Wigan Borough | 4–1 | Rochdale | Wigan |
| | Welsby; Lievesley; Welsh | Report | Robb (o.g.) | Stadium: Springfield Park; Attendance: 3940 |

| 23 February 1929 30 | New Brighton | 6–1 | Rochdale | New Brighton |
| | Cowper; Kirk; John Parker; Wadsworth | Report | Milsom | Stadium: Sandheys Park; Attendance: 2946 |

| 2 March 1929 31 | Rochdale | 2–1 | Crewe Alexandra | Rochdale |
| | Lewis; Milsom | Report | Scullion | Stadium: Spotland Stadium; Attendance: 3356 |

| 9 March 1929 32 | Tranmere Rovers | 5–1 | Rochdale | Birkenhead |
| | Jones; Charlton; Beswick | Report | Milsom | Stadium: Prenton Park; Attendance: 4055 |

| 16 March 1929 33 | Rochdale | 1–3 | Stockport County | Rochdale |
| | Milsom | Report | Fielding; Newton | Stadium: Spotland Stadium; Attendance: 11281 |

| 23 March 1929 34 | Halifax Town | 1–1 | Rochdale | Halifax |
| | Bell | Report | Milsom | Stadium: The Shay; Attendance: 3787 |

| 29 March 1929 35 | Chesterfield | 2–1 | Rochdale | Chesterfield |
| | Cowan | Report | Milsom | Stadium: Saltergate Recreation Ground; Attendance: 4730 |

| 30 March 1929 36 | Rochdale | 0–2 | Lincoln City | Rochdale |
| | | Report | Jenkins 3'; Kitching 51' | Stadium: Spotland Stadium; Attendance: 4848 |

| 1 April 1929 37 | Rochdale | 2–1 | Chesterfield | Rochdale |
| | Lewis | Report | Cowan | Stadium: Spotland Stadium; Attendance: 3329 |

| 6 April 1929 38 | Bradford City | 0–0 | Rochdale | Bradford |
| | | Report | | Stadium: Valley Parade; Attendance: 22669 |

| 13 April 1929 39 | Rochdale | 2–1 | Accrington Stanley | Rochdale |
| | Bertram | Report | Jepson | Stadium: Spotland Stadium; Attendance: 2894 |

| 20 April 1929 40 | Hartlepools United | 0–2 | Rochdale | Hartlepool |
| | | Report | Lewis; Bertram | Stadium: Victoria Park; Attendance: 1835 |

| 30 April 1929 41 | Rochdale | 1–3 | Bradford City | Rochdale |
| | Bertram | Report | Whitehurst; Cochrane; Cairns | Stadium: Spotland Stadium; Attendance: 20945 |

| 4 May 1929 42 | Rotherham United | 5–0 | Rochdale | Rotherham |
| | Bottrill; Orr; Parkin | Report | | Stadium: Millmoor; Attendance: 2899 |

=== FA Cup ===
| 24 November 1928 1 | Chesterfield | 3–2 | Rochdale | Chesterfield |
| | Roseboom; Taylor; Neale | Report | Martin; Milsom | Stadium: Saltergate Recreation Ground; Attendance: 5214 |

=== Lancashire Cup ===
| 17 September 1928 1 | Barrow | 2–1 | Rochdale | Barrow-in-Furness |
| | Goal | | Martin | Stadium: Holker Street; Attendance: 2758 |

=== Manchester Cup ===
| 27 February 1929 2 | Manchester City | 3–2 | Rochdale | Manchester |
| | Goal | | Milsom | Stadium: Maine Road |
