= 1929–30 Rochdale A.F.C. season =

English football club season

Rochdale
1929–30 season
- Manager: Jack Peart
- Stadium: Spotland Stadium
- Football League Third Division North: 10th
- FA Cup: 1st Round
- Top goalscorer: League: Tom Tippett (29); All: Tom Tippett (29)

The 1929–30 season was Rochdale's 23rd in existence and their 9th in the Football League Third Division North.

== Squad Statistics ==
=== Appearances and goals ===
No.	Pos	Nat	Player	Total		Division 3 North		FA Cup	
No.	Pos	Nat	Player	Apps	Goals	Apps	Goals	Apps	Goals
	GK	(England) ENG	Len Crompton	11	0	11	0	0	0
	DF	(England) ENG	Phil Hope	13	1	13	1	0	0
	DF	(England) ENG	Tom Watson	40	0	39	0	1	0
	MF	(England) ENG	James Parton	7	0	7	0	0	0
	MF	(England) ENG	Evan Hooker	25	0	25	0	0	0
	FW	(England) ENG	Jack Barber	43	1	42	1	1	0
	MF	(England) ENG	George Stott	40	13	39	13	1	0
	FW	(England) ENG	Billy Bertram	42	14	41	14	1	0
	FW	(England) ENG	Jack Milsom	15	14	14	13	1	1
	FW	(Wales) WAL	Harry Lewis	32	6	32	6	0	0
	MF	(Scotland) SCO	Tom Lindsay	7	0	7	0	0	0
	MF	(England) ENG	Jack Hall	9	0	8	0	1	0
	MF	(England) ENG	Lawrie Baker	35	0	34	0	1	0
	FW	(Wales) WAL	Christopher Jones	1	0	1	0	0	0
	FW	(England) ENG	Tom Tippett	31	29	30	29	1	0
	MF	(England) ENG	Dick Brown	40	10	39	10	1	0
	DF	(England) ENG	Allan Murray	5	0	5	0	0	0
	GK	(Wales) WAL	Thomas Lynch	32	0	31	0	1	0
	DF	(England) ENG	Dougie Oliver	27	0	26	0	1	0
	MF	(Wales) WAL	Idris Williams	15	1	15	1	0	0
	MF	(England) ENG	Austin Trippier	3	0	3	0	0	0
	MF	(England) ENG	Henry Martin	0	0	0	0	0	0

Squad Statistics (Non-competitive)

=== Appearances and goals (non-competitive) ===
No.	Pos	Nat	Player	Total		Lancashire Cup		Manchester Cup	
No.	Pos	Nat	Player	Apps	Goals	Apps	Goals	Apps	Goals
	GK	(England) ENG	Len Crompton	1	0	1	0	0	0
	DF	(England) ENG	Phil Hope	3	0	1	0	2	0
	DF	(England) ENG	Tom Watson	4	0	2	0	2	0
	MF	(England) ENG	James Parton	1	0	1	0	0	0
	MF	(England) ENG	Evan Hooker	0	0	0	0	0	0
	FW	(England) ENG	Jack Barber	5	0	2	0	3	0
	MF	(England) ENG	George Stott	6	3	2	1	4	2
	FW	(England) ENG	Billy Bertram	5	1	2	1	3	0
	FW	(England) ENG	Jack Milsom	2	1	2	1	0	0
	FW	(Wales) WAL	Harry Lewis	4	1	1	0	3	1
	MF	(Scotland) SCO	Tom Lindsay	0	0	0	0	0	0
	MF	(England) ENG	Jack Hall	5	0	2	0	3	0
	MF	(England) ENG	Lawrie Baker	3	0	1	0	2	0
	FW	(Wales) WAL	Christopher Jones	2	0	0	0	2	0
	FW	(England) ENG	Tom Tippett	4	6	1	1	3	5
	MF	(England) ENG	Dick Brown	6	2	2	0	4	2
	DF	(England) ENG	Allan Murray	1	0	1	0	0	0
	GK	(Wales) WAL	Thomas Lynch	5	0	1	0	4	0
	DF	(England) ENG	Dougie Oliver	4	0	0	0	4	0
	MF	(Wales) WAL	Idris Williams	4	0	0	0	4	0
	MF	(England) ENG	Austin Trippier	0	0	0	0	0	0
	MF	(England) ENG	Henry Martin	1	0	0	0	1	0

== Final league table ==
Pos	Team	Pld	W	D	L	GF	GA	GAv	Pts
8	Hartlepools United	42	17	11	14	81	74	1.095	45
9	Southport	42	15	13	14	81	74	1.095	43
10	Rochdale	42	18	7	17	89	91	0.978	43
11	Crewe Alexandra	42	17	8	17	82	71	1.155	42
12	Tranmere Rovers	42	16	9	17	83	86	0.965	41

Source: rsssf.com

== Competitions ==
=== Football League Third Division North ===
31 August 1929 1	Lincoln City	0–0	Rochdale	Lincoln
		Report		Stadium: Sincil Bank; Attendance: 6415

3 September 1929 2	Rochdale	2–1	Chesterfield	Rochdale
	Hope; Barber	Report	Lee	Stadium: Spotland Stadium; Attendance: 5878

7 September 1929 3	Rochdale	2–1	Tranmere Rovers	Rochdale
	Milsom; Bertram	Report	Meston	Stadium: Spotland Stadium; Attendance: 4403

14 September 1929 4	Halifax Town	2–3	Rochdale	Halifax
	Hickman	Report	Tippett; Stott; Wheelhouse (o.g.)	Stadium: The Shay; Attendance: 4982

17 September 1929 5	Rochdale	4–1	Darlington	Rochdale
	Brown; Bertram; Tippett	Report	Wrightson	Stadium: Spotland Stadium; Attendance: 5614

21 September 1929 6	Rochdale	1–2	Rotherham United	Rochdale
	Milsom	Report	Murden; Smailes	Stadium: Spotland Stadium; Attendance: 4700

28 September 1929 7	Wrexham	8–0	Rochdale	Wrexham
	Woodhouse; Ascroft; Longmuir; Bamford	Report		Stadium: Racecourse Ground; Attendance: 5445

5 October 1929 8	South Shields Adelaide Athletic	2–2	Rochdale	South Shields
	Maycock	Report	Bertram; Stott	Stadium: Horsley Hill; Attendance: 3876

12 October 1929 9	Rochdale	4–0	Accrington Stanley	Rochdale
	Milsom; Brown	Report		Stadium: Spotland Stadium; Attendance: 5362

19 October 1929 10	Rochdale	6–1	Barrow	Rochdale
	Milsom; Bertram	Report	Rock	Stadium: Spotland Stadium; Attendance: 4151

26 October 1929 11	Port Vale	3–3	Rochdale	Stoke-on-Trent
	Fishwick; Pynegar (pen.); Griffiths	Report	Milsom; Brown	Stadium: Old Recreation Ground; Attendance: 8902

2 November 1929 12	Rochdale	5–0	New Brighton	Rochdale
	Bertram; Milsom; Lewis	Report		Stadium: Spotland Stadium; Attendance: 3136

9 November 1929 13	Stockport County	4–2	Rochdale	Stockport
	Lincoln; Fielding; Bocking; Newton	Report	Milsom	Stadium: Edgeley Park; Attendance: 12903

23 November 1929 14	Crewe Alexandra	6–1	Rochdale	Crewe
	Broome; Scullion; Gorringe	Report	Milsom	Stadium: Gresty Road; Attendance: 4011

14 December 1929 15	Rochdale	2–1	Wigan Borough	Rochdale
	Tippett; Bertram	Report	Smith	Stadium: Spotland Stadium; Attendance: 1826

21 December 1929 16	Wigan Borough	3–1	Rochdale	Wigan
	Welsby; Smith	Report	Tippett	Stadium: Springfield Park; Attendance: 2518

25 December 1929 17	Rochdale	2–4	Doncaster Rovers	Rochdale
	Tippett; Bertram	Report	Smith; Bott; Patterson	Stadium: Spotland Stadium; Attendance: 2996

26 December 1929 18	Doncaster Rovers	3–1	Rochdale	Doncaster
	Patterson; Wadsworth; Gregory	Report	Tippett	Stadium: Belle Vue; Attendance: 7799

28 December 1929 A	Rochdale	1 a 1	Lincoln City	Rochdale
	Goal		Goal	Stadium: Spotland Stadium

1 January 1930 19	Chesterfield	2–0	Rochdale	Chesterfield
	Hunt; Bullock	Report		Stadium: Saltergate Recreation Ground; Attendance: 5293

4 January 1930 20	Tranmere Rovers	2–2	Rochdale	Birkenhead
	Cartman; Urmson	Report	Tippett; Brown	Stadium: Prenton Park; Attendance: 3273

11 January 1930 21	Rochdale	2–2	Southport	Rochdale
	Tippett	Report	Cowen; Hills	Stadium: Spotland Stadium; Attendance: 2101

14 January 1930 22	Nelson	1–0	Rochdale	Nelson
	Hedley	Report		Stadium: Seedhill; Attendance: 1359

18 January 1930 23	Rochdale	0–3	Halifax Town	Rochdale
		Report	Proctor; Cooper	Stadium: Spotland Stadium; Attendance: 2759

25 January 1930 24	Rotherham United	0–4	Rochdale	Rotherham
		Report	Tippett; Stott; Bertram	Stadium: Millmoor; Attendance: 5915

1 February 1930 25	Rochdale	5–4	Wrexham	Rochdale
	Stott; Tippett; Lewis	Report	Rogers; Bell; Bamford	Stadium: Spotland Stadium; Attendance: 2637

8 February 1930 26	Rochdale	2–0	South Shields Adelaide Athletic	Rochdale
	Tippett; Stott	Report		Stadium: Spotland Stadium; Attendance: 3176

15 February 1930 27	Accrington Stanley	6–2	Rochdale	Accrington
	Pears; Hawes; Ferguson; Parsons	Report	Bertram	Stadium: Peel Park; Attendance: 4361

22 February 1930 28	Barrow	2–0	Rochdale	Barrow-in-Furness
	Murray; Millar	Report		Stadium: Holker Street; Attendance: 3216

1 March 1930 29	Rochdale	0–0	Port Vale	Rochdale
		Report		Stadium: Spotland Stadium; Attendance: 7177

8 March 1930 30	New Brighton	2–0	Rochdale	New Brighton
	Oakes; Taylor	Report		Stadium: Sandheys Park; Attendance: 4160

15 March 1930 31	Rochdale	3–1	Stockport County	Rochdale
	Williams; Tippett	Report	Tompkinson	Stadium: Spotland Stadium; Attendance: 4516

22 March 1930 32	York City	6–0	Rochdale	York
	Gardner; Fenoughty; Millar; Bottrill	Report		Stadium: Fulfordgate; Attendance: 4720

29 March 1930 33	Rochdale	3–1	Crewe Alexandra	Rochdale
	Tippett; Stott	Report	Pringle	Stadium: Spotland Stadium; Attendance: 2370

5 April 1930 34	Southport	2–3	Rochdale	Southport
	Cowen; Allen	Report	Lewis; Stott	Stadium: Haig Avenue; Attendance: 2703

8 April 1930 35	Rochdale	3–4	Lincoln City	Rochdale
	Tippett	Report	Roberts; Ellis	Stadium: Spotland Stadium; Attendance: 1046

12 April 1930 36	Rochdale	4–1	Nelson	Rochdale
	Brown; Bertram; Stott	Report	Carmedy	Stadium: Spotland Stadium; Attendance: 2621

18 April 1930 37	Rochdale	1–1	Hartlepools United	Rochdale
	Stott	Report	Pedwell	Stadium: Spotland Stadium; Attendance: 2441

19 April 1930 38	Carlisle United	2–0	Rochdale	Carlisle
	Hutchison; Henderson	Report		Stadium: Brunton Park; Attendance: 2987

21 April 1930 39	Hartlepools United	2–8	Rochdale	Hartlepool
	Pedwell	Report	Brown; Tippett	Stadium: Victoria Park; Attendance: 3655

22 April 1930 40	Darlington	3–0	Rochdale	Darlington
	Wellock; Brown; Mitchell	Report		Stadium: Feethams; Attendance: 3013

29 April 1930 41	Rochdale	2–0	Carlisle United	Rochdale
	Stott	Report		Stadium: Spotland Stadium; Attendance: 1758

3 May 1930 42	Rochdale	4–2	York City	Rochdale
	Lewis; Tippett; Brown	Report	Gardner; Bottrill	Stadium: Spotland Stadium; Attendance: 1564

=== FA Cup ===
30 November 1929 1	Accrington Stanley	3–1	Rochdale	Accrington
	Jepson; Armstrong	Report	Milsom	Stadium: Peel Park; Attendance: 5500

=== Lancashire Cup ===
9 September 1929 1	Nelson	3–4	Rochdale	Nelson
	Goal		Milsom; Tippett; Bertram; Stott	Stadium: Seedhill

16 October 1929 2	Manchester United	5–0	Rochdale	Manchester
	Goal			Stadium: Old Trafford

=== Manchester Cup ===
4 March 1930 3	Ashton National	1–6	Rochdale	Ashton-under-Lyne
	Goal		Tippett; Brown; Lewis; Stott	Stadium: National Park; Attendance: 3300

1 April 1930 SF	Rochdale	3–3	Wigan Borough	Rochdale
	Tippett; Stott		Goal	Stadium: Spotland Stadium; Attendance: 3000

9 April 1930 SF - Replay 1	Wigan Borough	0–0	Rochdale	Wigan
				Stadium: Springfield Park

30 April 1930 SF - Replay 2	Rochdale	1–2	Wigan Borough	Rochdale
	Tippett		Goal	Stadium: Spotland Stadium
