= 1931–32 Rochdale A.F.C. season =

English football club season

Rochdale
1931–32 season
- Manager: Will Cameron; Herbert Hopkinson
- Stadium: Spotland Stadium
- Football League Third Division North: 21st
- FA Cup: First Round
- Top goalscorer: League: Reg Watson (8); All: Reg Watson (8)
Home colours

The 1931–32 season was Rochdale A.F.C.'s 25th season in existence and their 11th season in the Football League Third Division North. They finished in 21st and last position with 11 points.

During the season they only managed four wins and went on a record-breaking run of 17 straight defeats. However, they were re-elected at the end of the season.

== Squad Statistics ==
=== Appearances and goals ===
| No. | Pos | Nat | Player | Total | | Division3 (N) | | FA Cup | |
| No. | Pos | Nat | Player | Apps | Goals | Apps | Goals | Apps | Goals |
|---|---|---|---|---|---|---|---|---|---|
| N/A | GK | (England) ENG | Harry Abbott | 33 | 0 | 32 | 0 | 1 | 0 |
| N/A | DF | (Scotland) SCO | James Beattie | 15 | 0 | 14 | 0 | 1 | 0 |
| N/A | DF | (Scotland) SCO | Adam Plunkett | 12 | 0 | 12 | 0 | 0 | 0 |
| N/A | DF | (England) ENG | Bill Armstrong | 4 | 0 | 4 | 0 | 0 | 0 |
| N/A | DF | (Ireland) EIR | Jack Everest | 23 | 6 | 22 | 6 | 1 | 0 |
| N/A | MF | (England) ENG | George Ward | 22 | 0 | 22 | 0 | 0 | 0 |
| N/A | MF | (England) ENG | Ernest Steele | 20 | 3 | 19 | 3 | 1 | 0 |
| N/A | FW | (South Africa) RSA | David Murray | 23 | 4 | 22 | 3 | 1 | 1 |
| N/A | FW | (Scotland) SCO | George Guyan | 4 | 1 | 4 | 1 | 0 | 0 |
| N/A | FW | (Wales) WAL | Benny Jones | 20 | 3 | 19 | 3 | 1 | 0 |
| N/A | MF | (Scotland) SCO | Con Hilley | 3 | 0 | 3 | 0 | 0 | 0 |
| N/A | DF | (Scotland) SCO | Jimmy Hamilton | 40 | 0 | 39 | 0 | 1 | 0 |
| N/A | MF | (Wales) WAL | Idris Williams | 35 | 2 | 34 | 2 | 1 | 0 |
| N/A | MF | (England) ENG | Robert Forster | 2 | 0 | 2 | 0 | 0 | 0 |
| N/A | MF | (England) ENG | Harry Platt | 13 | 0 | 13 | 0 | 0 | 0 |
| N/A | FW | (England) ENG | Reg Watson | 18 | 8 | 17 | 8 | 1 | 0 |
| N/A | MF | (Scotland) SCO | Joe McAleer | 21 | 7 | 20 | 7 | 1 | 0 |
| N/A | DF | (Scotland) SCO | Edward Black | 8 | 0 | 8 | 0 | 0 | 0 |
| N/A | MF | (England) ENG | Fred Appleyard | 2 | 0 | 2 | 0 | 0 | 0 |
| N/A | FW | (England) ENG | Fred Brown | 21 | 6 | 21 | 6 | 0 | 0 |
| N/A | FW | (Scotland) SCO | Ken Nisbet | 12 | 2 | 12 | 2 | 0 | 0 |
| N/A | MF | (England) ENG | Roland Hill | 3 | 0 | 2 | 0 | 1 | 0 |
| N/A | GK | (England) ENG | Bert Welch | 8 | 0 | 8 | 0 | 0 | 0 |
| N/A | MF | (England) ENG | Harold Howarth | 20 | 4 | 20 | 4 | 0 | 0 |
| N/A | DF | (England) ENG | Walter Webster | 14 | 0 | 14 | 0 | 0 | 0 |
| N/A | DF | (England) ENG | Frank Twine | 10 | 0 | 10 | 0 | 0 | 0 |
| N/A | MF | (England) ENG | Jimmy Bimson | 12 | 1 | 12 | 1 | 0 | 0 |
| N/A | FW | (England) ENG | Arthur Hawes | 13 | 0 | 13 | 0 | 0 | 0 |
| N/A | MF | (England) ENG | Tommy Hogg | 10 | 1 | 10 | 1 | 0 | 0 |
| N/A | MF | (England) ENG | Ron Hornby | 2 | 0 | 2 | 0 | 0 | 0 |
| N/A | FW | (England) ENG | Reg Grant | 1 | 0 | 1 | 0 | 0 | 0 |
| N/A | FW | (Scotland) SCO | John Whitelaw | 1 | 0 | 1 | 0 | 0 | 0 |
| N/A | FW | (England) ENG | George White | 1 | 0 | 1 | 0 | 0 | 0 |
| N/A | FW | (England) ENG | John Crowther | 1 | 1 | 1 | 1 | 0 | 0 |
| N/A | DF | (England) ENG | Clarence Constantine | 2 | 0 | 2 | 0 | 0 | 0 |
| N/A | FW | (Scotland) SCO | Tommy Flannigan | 2 | 0 | 2 | 0 | 0 | 0 |
| N/A | GK | (England) ENG | Eddie Plane | 0 | 0 | 0 | 0 | 0 | 0 |

Squad Statistics (Non-competitive)

=== Appearances and goals (non-competitive) ===
| No. | Pos | Nat | Player | Total | | Lancashire Cup | | Manchester Cup | |
| No. | Pos | Nat | Player | Apps | Goals | Apps | Goals | Apps | Goals |
|---|---|---|---|---|---|---|---|---|---|
| N/A | GK | (England) ENG | Harry Abbott | 1 | 0 | 1 | 0 | 0 | 0 |
| N/A | DF | (Scotland) SCO | James Beattie | 1 | 0 | 1 | 0 | 0 | 0 |
| N/A | DF | (Scotland) SCO | Adam Plunkett | 0 | 0 | 0 | 0 | 0 | 0 |
| N/A | DF | (England) ENG | Bill Armstrong | 1 | 0 | 1 | 0 | 0 | 0 |
| N/A | DF | (Ireland) EIR | Jack Everest | 1 | 0 | 1 | 0 | 0 | 0 |
| N/A | MF | (England) ENG | George Ward | 2 | 0 | 1 | 0 | 1 | 0 |
| N/A | MF | (England) ENG | Ernest Steele | 2 | 0 | 1 | 0 | 1 | 0 |
| N/A | FW | (South Africa) RSA | David Murray | 2 | 0 | 1 | 0 | 1 | 0 |
| N/A | FW | (Scotland) SCO | George Guyan | 0 | 0 | 0 | 0 | 0 | 0 |
| N/A | FW | (Wales) WAL | Benny Jones | 1 | 0 | 0 | 0 | 1 | 0 |
| N/A | MF | (Scotland) SCO | Con Hilley | 0 | 0 | 0 | 0 | 0 | 0 |
| N/A | DF | (Scotland) SCO | Jimmy Hamilton | 2 | 0 | 1 | 0 | 1 | 0 |
| N/A | MF | (Wales) WAL | Idris Williams | 2 | 0 | 1 | 0 | 1 | 0 |
| N/A | MF | (England) ENG | Robert Forster | 0 | 0 | 0 | 0 | 0 | 0 |
| N/A | MF | (England) ENG | Harry Platt | 1 | 0 | 0 | 0 | 1 | 0 |
| N/A | FW | (England) ENG | Reg Watson | 1 | 0 | 1 | 0 | 0 | 0 |
| N/A | MF | (Scotland) SCO | Joe McAleer | 1 | 0 | 1 | 0 | 0 | 0 |
| N/A | DF | (Scotland) SCO | Edward Black | 0 | 0 | 0 | 0 | 0 | 0 |
| N/A | MF | (England) ENG | Fred Appleyard | 0 | 0 | 0 | 0 | 0 | 0 |
| N/A | FW | (England) ENG | Fred Brown | 0 | 0 | 0 | 0 | 0 | 0 |
| N/A | FW | (Scotland) SCO | Ken Nisbet | 0 | 0 | 0 | 0 | 0 | 0 |
| N/A | MF | (England) ENG | Roland Hill | 0 | 0 | 0 | 0 | 0 | 0 |
| N/A | GK | (England) ENG | Bert Welch | 0 | 0 | 0 | 0 | 0 | 0 |
| N/A | MF | (England) ENG | Harold Howarth | 1 | 0 | 0 | 0 | 1 | 0 |
| N/A | DF | (England) ENG | Walter Webster | 1 | 0 | 0 | 0 | 1 | 0 |
| N/A | DF | (England) ENG | Frank Twine | 0 | 0 | 0 | 0 | 0 | 0 |
| N/A | MF | (England) ENG | Jimmy Bimson | 0 | 0 | 0 | 0 | 0 | 0 |
| N/A | FW | (England) ENG | Arthur Hawes | 0 | 0 | 0 | 0 | 0 | 0 |
| N/A | MF | (England) ENG | Tommy Hogg | 0 | 0 | 0 | 0 | 0 | 0 |
| N/A | MF | (England) ENG | Ron Hornby | 1 | 0 | 0 | 0 | 1 | 0 |
| N/A | FW | (England) ENG | Reg Grant | 0 | 0 | 0 | 0 | 0 | 0 |
| N/A | FW | (Scotland) SCO | John Whitelaw | 0 | 0 | 0 | 0 | 0 | 0 |
| N/A | FW | (England) ENG | George White | 0 | 0 | 0 | 0 | 0 | 0 |
| N/A | FW | (England) ENG | John Crowther | 0 | 0 | 0 | 0 | 0 | 0 |
| N/A | DF | (England) ENG | Clarence Constantine | 0 | 0 | 0 | 0 | 0 | 0 |
| N/A | FW | (Scotland) SCO | Tommy Flannigan | 0 | 0 | 0 | 0 | 0 | 0 |
| N/A | GK | (England) ENG | Eddie Plane | 1 | 0 | 0 | 0 | 1 | 0 |

== Final league table ==
| Pos | Team | Pld | W | D | L | GF | GA | GAv | Pts | Promotion |
|---|---|---|---|---|---|---|---|---|---|---|
| 18 | Carlisle United | 40 | 11 | 11 | 18 | 64 | 79 | 0.810 | 33 | |
| 19 | Rotherham United | 40 | 14 | 4 | 22 | 63 | 72 | 0.875 | 32 | |
| 20 | New Brighton | 40 | 8 | 8 | 24 | 38 | 76 | 0.500 | 24 | |
| 21 | Rochdale | 40 | 4 | 3 | 33 | 48 | 135 | 0.356 | 11 | Re-elected |
| 22 | Wigan Borough | 0 | 0 | 0 | 0 | 0 | 0 | — | 0 | Resigned from the league and folded (Note: Wigan Borough resigned from the Football League on 21 October and folded. Their record (P12 W3 D1 L8 F12 A32 GA 0.375 Pts 7) was expunged.) |

Source: rsssf.com

== Competitions ==
=== Legend ===
| Win | Draw | Loss |

=== Football League Third Division North ===
| 29 August 1931 1 | Rochdale | 2–2 | Accrington Stanley | Rochdale |
| | Jones; Guyan | Report | Wright; Viner | Stadium: Spotland Stadium; Attendance: 6,974 |

| 31 August 1931 2 | Rotherham United | 5–0 | Rochdale | Rotherham |
| | Sellars; Hick; Spicer | Report | | Stadium: Millmoor; Attendance: 6,431 |

| 5 September 1931 3 | Wrexham | 4–0 | Rochdale | Wrexham |
| | Taylor; Bamford | Report | | Stadium: Racecourse Ground; Attendance: 7,390 |

| 7 September 1931 4 | Stockport County | 3–1 | Rochdale | Stockport |
| | Webster; Scullion | Report | Watson | Stadium: Edgeley Park; Attendance: 3,941 |

| 12 September 1931 5 | Rochdale | 4–3 | Carlisle United | Rochdale |
| | Watson; Everest; Steele | Report | Watson; McConnell | Stadium: Spotland Stadium; Attendance: 4,382 |

| 15 September 1931 6 | Rochdale | 1–0 | Stockport County | Rochdale |
| | Williams | Report | | Stadium: Spotland Stadium; Attendance: 4,384 |

| 19 September 1931 7 | Crewe Alexandra | 1–0 | Rochdale | Crewe |
| | Swindells | Report | | Stadium: Gresty Road; Attendance: 6,358 |

| 26 September 1931 8 | Rochdale | 1–1 | Darlington | Rochdale |
| | McAleer | Report | Siddle | Stadium: Spotland Stadium; Attendance: 3,703 |

| 3 October 1931 9 | Rochdale | 3–1 | Doncaster Rovers | Rochdale |
| | McAleer; Watson | Report | Emery | Stadium: Spotland Stadium; Attendance: 4,641 |

| 10 October 1931 10 | Southport | 3–1 | Rochdale | Southport |
| | Cowen; McConnell; Holmes | Report | Steele | Stadium: Haig Avenue; Attendance: 5,442 |

| 17 October 1931 11 | Halifax Town | 3–2 | Rochdale | Halifax |
| | Crawford; Betteridge | Report | Everest; Murray | Stadium: The Shay; Attendance: 4,082 |

| 24 October 1931 12 | Rochdale | 0–1 | Walsall | Rochdale |
| | | Report | Pointon | Stadium: Spotland Stadium; Attendance: 2,845 |

| 31 October 1931 13 | Gateshead | 3–1 | Rochdale | Gateshead |
| | Welsh; Meek | Report | Jones | Stadium: Redheugh Park; Attendance: 7,227 |

| 7 November 1931 14 | Rochdale | 3–2 | New Brighton | Rochdale |
| | Jones; Everest | Report | Rawsthorne | Stadium: Spotland Stadium; Attendance: 1,888 |

| 14 November 1931 15 | Barrow | 4–1 | Rochdale | Barrow-in-Furness |
| | Littler; Wilson | Report | Watson | Stadium: Holker Street; Attendance: 2,542 |

| 21 November 1931 16 | Rochdale | 3–6 | Hull City | Rochdale |
| | Watson; Nisbet | Report | Wainscoat; Speed; Munnings; D. Duncan; A. Duncan | Stadium: Spotland Stadium; Attendance: 4,593 |

| 5 December 1931 17 | Rochdale | 0–3 | Chester City | Rochdale |
| | | Report | Cresswell; Hedley; Jennings | Stadium: Spotland Stadium; Attendance: 3,119 |

| 12 December 1931 18 | Hartlepool United | 3–0 | Rochdale | Hartlepool |
| | Hewitt; Dixon | Report | | Stadium: Victoria Park; Attendance: 3,085 |

| 25 December 1931 19 | Tranmere Rovers | 9–1 | Rochdale | Birkenhead |
| | Dixon; Whitehurst; Watts; Meston | Report | Murray | Stadium: Prenton Park; Attendance: 5,719 |

| 26 December 1931 20 | Rochdale | 3–6 | Tranmere Rovers | Rochdale |
| | Brown; Murray; Everest | Report | Urmson; Watts; Dixon; Lewis; Meston | Stadium: Spotland Stadium; Attendance: 3,993 |

| 2 January 1932 21 | Accrington Stanley | 3–0 | Rochdale | Accrington |
| | Williamson; Jones; Agar | Report | | Stadium: Peel Park; Attendance: 1,824 |

| 9 January 1932 22 | Lincoln City | 3–0 | Rochdale | Lincoln |
| | Hall; Cartwright | Report | | Stadium: Sincil Bank; Attendance: 6,737 |

| 16 January 1932 23 | Rochdale | 2–4 | Wrexham | Rochdale |
| | Everest; Steele | Report | Mustard; Parden | Stadium: Spotland Stadium; Attendance: 1,749 |

| 23 January 1932 24 | Carlisle United | 4–0 | Rochdale | Carlisle |
| | Hutchison; McConnell | Report | | Stadium: Brunton Park; Attendance: 3,812 |

| 30 January 1932 25 | Rochdale | 2–3 | Crewe Alexandra | Rochdale |
| | Howarth; Brown | Report | Swindells; Weale | Stadium: Spotland Stadium; Attendance: 1,978 |

| 6 February 1932 26 | Darlington | 3–1 | Rochdale | Darlington |
| | Waugh; Wellock; Coates | Report | Nisbet | Stadium: Feethams; Attendance: 2,764 |

| 13 February 1932 27 | Doncaster Rovers | 2–0 | Rochdale | Doncaster |
| | Atherton; Pattison | Report | | Stadium: Belle Vue; Attendance: 2,856 |

| 20 February 1932 28 | Rochdale | 0–1 | Southport | Rochdale |
| | | Report | Bell | Stadium: Spotland Stadium; Attendance: 2,894 |

| 27 February 1932 29 | Rochdale | 1–4 | Halifax Town | Rochdale |
| | Crowther | Report | Crawford; Betteridge; Johnson; Read | Stadium: Spotland Stadium; Attendance: 3,154 |

| 5 March 1932 30 | Walsall | 2–1 | Rochdale | Walsall |
| | Turner; Reed | Report | Brown | Stadium: Fellows Park; Attendance: 2,601 |

| 12 March 1932 31 | Rochdale | 0–3 | Gateshead | Rochdale |
| | | Report | Welsh; Meek | Stadium: Spotland Stadium; Attendance: 2,526 |

| 19 March 1932 32 | New Brighton | 1–1 | Rochdale | New Brighton |
| | Rawsthorne | Report | Brown | Stadium: Sandheys Park; Attendance: 2,362 |

| 25 March 1932 33 | York City | 5–2 | Rochdale | York |
| | Baines; Thompson; Jenkinson | Report | McAleer; Howarth | Stadium: Fulfordgate; Attendance: 5,285 |

| 26 March 1932 34 | Rochdale | 0–6 | Barrow | Rochdale |
| | | Report | Webster (o.g.); Millar; Postlethwaite; Suggett; Bimson (o.g.) | Stadium: Spotland Stadium; Attendance: 2,189 |

| 28 March 1932 35 | Rochdale | 3–5 | York City | Rochdale |
| | McAleer; Brown | Report | Baines; Spooner; Fenoughty | Stadium: Spotland Stadium; Attendance: 1,387 |

| 2 April 1932 36 | Hull City | 4–1 | Rochdale | Hull |
| | Munnings; Mills | Report | Hogg | Stadium: The Boulevard; Attendance: 3,611 |

| 9 April 1932 37 | Rochdale | 3–5 | Lincoln City | Rochdale |
| | McAleer; Williams | Report | Pringle; Riley; Cartwright; Whyte | Stadium: Spotland Stadium; Attendance: 1,038 |

| 16 April 1932 38 | Chester City | 7–2 | Rochdale | Chester |
| | Mercer; Williams (o.g.); Jennings; Hedley | Report | McAleer; Howarth | Stadium: Sealand Road; Attendance: 4,658 |

| 23 April 1932 39 | Rochdale | 1–3 | Hartlepool United | Rochdale |
| | Bimson | Report | Thornton; Dixon | Stadium: Spotland Stadium; Attendance: 1,379 |

| 7 May 1932 40 | Rochdale | 1–4 | Rotherham United | Rochdale |
| | Howarth; McAleer (red card) | Report | Beynon; Gray; Parkin | Stadium: Spotland Stadium; Attendance: 1,724 |

=== FA Cup ===
| 28 November 1931 R1 | Scunthorpe United | 2–1 | Rochdale | Scunthorpe |
| | Methven; Hubbard | Report | Murray | Stadium: Old Showground; Attendance: 5,000 |

=== Lancashire Cup ===
| 22 September 1931 R2 | Rochdale | 0–1 | Accrington Stanley | Rochdale |
| | | | Goal | Stadium: Spotland Stadium |

=== Manchester Cup ===
| 24 February 1932 R3 | Manchester City | 6–0 | Rochdale | Manchester |
| | Goal | | | Stadium: Maine Road |
