= Guyan =

Guyan is both a given name and a surname. Notable people with the name include:

- Guyan Kanté (born 1982), Ivorian footballer
- Guyan Porter (born 1971), Scottish artist
- George Guyan (1901–1984), Scottish footballer
- Li Guyan, Chinese official
