= Milsom =

Milsom is a surname. Notable people by that name include:

- Edward Milsom, rugby league footballer who played in the 1890s
- Jack Milsom (1907–1977), English footballer
- Nigel Milsom (born 1975), Australian painter
- Robert Milsom (born 1987), English footballer
- Rosemarie Milsom, Australian journalist, director of Adelaide Writers' Week since May 2026
- S. F. C. Milsom (1923–2016), English legal historian
- Veronica Milsom (born 1984), Australian radio presenter, comedian, and actress

== See also ==
- Milsom Rees
