= Albert Latham =

Albert Latham may refer to:

- Albert George Latham, professor of modern languages
- Albert Latham (footballer), English footballer
