= Fred Appleyard (footballer) =

English association football player (1909–1995)

Personal information
- Full name: Fred Appleyard
- Date of birth: 13 June 1909
- Place of birth: Norden, England
- Date of death: March 1995 (aged 85)
- Place of death: Ulverston, England
- Height: 5 ft 9 in (1.75 m)
- Positions: Left-half; inside left

Senior career*
Years	Team	Apps	(Gls)
- Norden St James
1928–1932	Rochdale	6	(0)
1933–193?	Norden Congregationalists		
1935–19??	Rochdale St Clement's		
- * Club domestic league appearances and goals

Fred Appleyard (13 June 1909 – March 1995) was an English professional footballer who played as a left-half or inside-left in the Football League for Rochdale, and in non-League football for Norden St James, Norden Congregationalists and Rochdale St Clement's.

== Life and career ==
Fred Appleyard was born on 13 June 1909 in Norden, Rochdale, Lancashire. He was the second son of George Appleyard, a domestic coachman, and his wife Sarah, and had an older brother, Willie.

Appleyard played in non-League football for Norden St James before signing for Third Division North club Rochdale on amateur forms in January 1928. He made his debut on 9 March 1929 in a 5–1 defeat away to Tranmere Rovers in the league, which proved to be his only appearance of the 1928–29 season. He turned professional in 1930, and made his next first-team appearance in November of that year. He appeared in four matches in the 1930–31 season, three in the league and one in the FA Cup. Having finished in 21st place, Rochdale had to apply for re-election, and with the club's future uncertain, Appleyard was one of just six players offered terms for the 1931–32 season. Their application was successful, and Appleyard made two more league appearances. His last, in January 1932, was as stand-in for Rochdale's regular left half, George Ward, in a 3–2 defeat at home to Crewe Alexandra. After leaving Rochdale he returned to playing in non-League with Norden Congregationalists, which he joined in June 1933, and Rochdale St Clement's from September 1935.

The 1939 Register finds Appleyard living in Rochdale with his parents and a younger sister and employed as a production process worker in textile bleaching and dyeing. He died in Ulverston, Cumbria, in March 1995 at the age of 85.

== Career statistics ==
Appearances and goals by club, season and competition
Club	Season	League			FA Cup		Total	
Club	Season	Division	Apps	Goals	Apps	Goals	Apps	Goals
Rochdale	1928–29	Third Division North	1	0	0	0	1	0
Rochdale	1930–31	Third Division North	3	0	1	0	4	0
Rochdale	1931–32	Third Division North	2	0	0	0	2	0
Career total			6	0	1	0	7	0
