= Charles Howlett (disambiguation) =

Charles Howlett may refer to:

- Charles Howlett (1885–1932), dental surgeon, politician and amateur actor
- Charlie Howlett (1864–1903), English footballer for Sheffield United
- Charlie Howlett (footballer, born 1906) (1906–1990), English footballer, for Durham City, Rochdale and Halifax Town
