= George Grierson =

George Grierson may refer to:

- George Grierson (politician) (1867–1931), politician in Manitoba, Canada
- George Grierson (printer) (c. 1679–1753), Scottish-born printer and publisher in Dublin, Ireland
- George Grierson (footballer) (1905–1962), Scottish footballer
- George Abraham Grierson (1851–1941), Irish administrator and linguist in British India
