= Frederick Gregory =

Frederick or Fred Gregory may refer to:

- Frederick D. Gregory (born 1941), United States Air Force pilot and NASA astronaut
- Frederick Gugenheim Gregory (1893–1961), British botanist and plant physiologist
- Fred Gregory (footballer, born 1886) (1886–1937), English footballer
- Fred Gregory (footballer, born 1911) (1911–1985), English footballer
