= Parden =

Parden is a surname. Notable people with the surname include:

- Bernard Parden (1907–unknown), English footballer
- Molly Parden (fl. 2011), American folk musician
- Noah W. Parden (c. 1868–1944), American attorney and politician
