= Joe McAleer =

Scottish footballer (1910–1949)

Personal information
- Full name: Joseph Edward McAleer
- Date of birth: 8 March 1910
- Place of birth: Blythswood, Scotland
- Date of death: 17 April 1949 (aged 39)
- Place of death: Limerick, Ireland
- Height: 5 ft 9 in (1.75 m)
- Position: Forward

Senior career*
Years	Team	Apps	(Gls)
1926	St Roch's		
1926–1927	Bridgeton Waverley		
1927–1928	St Anthony's		
1929	Bridgeton Waverley		
1929–1930	Glenboig St Joseph's		
1930–1931	Arbroath	26	(15)
1931–1933	Rochdale	35	(8)
1933	Glenavon	0	(0)
1933–1934	Northampton Town	13	(8)
1934–1935	Lincoln City	7	(5)
1935–1936	Clapton Orient		
1936–1937	Gillingham	9	(3)
1937	Brideville		
1937–1938	Wrexham	7	(1)
.	Partick Thistle		
1938–1939	King's Park		
1939	Glentoran		
1939–1940	Sligo Rovers		
1940–	Limerick		
- * Club domestic league appearances and goals

Joseph Edward McAleer (8 March 1910 – 17 April 1949) was a Scottish professional footballer. During his career he played for clubs in all the countries of the British Isles.

In 1930, following playing over several seasons for Junior League level clubs around Glasgow, he signed with east coast Scottish Football League Second Division club Arbroath. In his second league game for 'the Red Lichties' he scored all five goals in a 5–1 defeat of Armadale. After one season with Arbroath he moved south to England and signed with Football League Third Division North team Rochdale. He remained there for two seasons – during the first of which, 1931–1932, the club finished bottom of the league (but were re-elected) and with seven strikes from his 20 matches he was the club's second highest league goalscorer.

Over the next eight seasons he became a nomadic player: not commanding a regular spot he spent no more than a single season with any club. After leaving Rochdale he signed in July 1933 with Irish League club Glenavon but by early August, before the season commenced, he had been granted release from his contract. At the end of that month he joined Northampton Town of the Football League Third Division South and stayed for the remainder of the 1933–1934 season. Over the next three years he had single season stays at Football league clubs Lincoln City of the Third Division North and then two Third Division South clubs Clapton Orient and Gillingham for whom he scored a winning goal on his debut.

In August 1937 it was reported he had signed for Kent League outfit Ashford and was named in a prospective teamsheet but nothing came of this and by mid October he was with Brideville of the League of Ireland. However at the end of the same month he signed on with Welsh club Wrexham who were members of the Football League Third Division North and stayed until the season's end. During the next season in late October 1938 he played as a trialist for Stirling based King's Park of Scottish Football League Second Division and scored a hat-trick: in early December he signed for the club and played with them for the remainder of the campaign.

In August 1939 he returned to Northern Ireland signing with Glentoran. However once again his stay in the country was short – in mid September with football in the United Kingdom being disrupted by the Second World War his contract was cancelled by mutual consent and he moved over the border to Ireland and signed-on with League of Ireland Sligo Rovers. He was the league's third-equal highest goalscorer over the 1939–1940 season with 15 goals and played for the club in their losing appearance in the final of the 1940 FAI Cup.

In the summer of 1940 he stayed within the same league but changed clubs to Limerick. The 1940–1941 season was the first of a multi-season stay at the club: he was connected to Limerick over the next nine years and was club coach at his death in April 1949.

In 1948 he had been the team trainer for the League of Ireland team to face a Scottish League XI.
