= Scottish Artists Union =

SAU
- Scottish Artists Union
- Founded: May 2001; 24 years ago
- Headquarters: The Briggait, Bridgegate, Glasgow
- Location: Scotland
- Members: ▲2,729 (2025)
- President: B. D. Owens
- Affiliations: STUC
- Website: artistsunion.scot

The Scottish Artists Union is the representative voice for visual and applied artists in Scotland, one of the largest arts membership organisations in the country.

== History ==
The SAU was constituted in 2001 with a meeting of Scottish artists at the Scottish Trades Union Congress headquarters in Glasgow. The union claim to be the first new trade union of the 21st century. Scottish artists involved in the initiative from the outset included Guyan Porter, Ann McCluskey, painter Gerry Morris and photographer Ken Palmer.

The new trade union was set up with three main aims, protection and extension of artists' rights, to lobby on behalf of artists and to provide financial benefits, such as cheaper insurance.

One of the recurring priorities for the SAU has been fair rates of pay for visual artists doing workshops and other such activities. The SAU produced a statement on Recommended Rates of Pay in 2002 and this was endorsed by the Scottish Arts Council. The SAU continues to campaign for appropriate contracts across all areas of visual artists practice including for workshops, as well as with galleries exhibiting work, and commissioners.

In 2006-07 the SAU was able to secure a deal for Public Liability Insurance for the membership, following 2–3 years research by Chris Biddlecombe, a founding member of the Executive. This was a priority because increasingly members were describing Public Liability Insurance being a requirement for working for Local Authorities, Open Studio Events and other aspects of trading as a visual artist in Scotland. Later, a studio contents insurance package was added.

The SAU has attempted to establish as wide a remit as possible from the very beginning. There is virtually no discipline within visual arts and applied arts that does not qualify for membership. The criteria on which membership is predicated are designed simply to ensure that the membership is made up of professionals.

By 2012 the SAU had almost 1000 members, making it one of the largest arts membership organisations in Scotland.

== List of presidents ==
- Guyan Porter (founding President) 2001-2004
- Su Grierson 2004-2006
- Terry Anderson 2006-2009
- Chris Biddlecombe 2009-2011
- Rowena Comrie 2011-2014
- Janie Nicoll] 2014-2017
- Sinead Dunn 2017-2019
- Lynda Graham 2019 - 2022
- BD Owens 2022 -
