= Thomas Lynch (footballer) =

Welsh footballer

Personal information
- Full name: Thomas John Lynch
- Date of birth: 31 August 1907
- Place of birth: Sirhowy, Wales
- Date of death: 1976 (aged 68–69)
- Place of death: Bangor, Wales
- Position: Goalkeeper

Senior career*
Years	Team	Apps	(Gls)
- Rhymney
1929–1931	Rochdale	58	(0)
1931–1932	Colwyn Bay United		
1932–1933	Barnsley	19	(0)
1933–1934	Barrow	4	(0)
1934–1935	Yeovil & Petters United		
1935–1937	Brentford	0	(0)
1937	Watford	2	(0)
1937–1938	Gloucester City		
- Bangor City
- * Club domestic league appearances and goals

Thomas John Lynch (31 August 1907 – 1976) was a Welsh professional footballer who played in the Football League for Rochdale, Barnsley, Barrow and Watford as a goalkeeper.

== Career statistics ==
Appearances and goals by club, season and competition
Club	Season	League			FA Cup		Other		Total	
Club	Season	Division	Apps	Goals	Apps	Goals	Apps	Goals	Apps	Goals
Rochdale	1929–30	Third Division North	31	0	1	0	2 (Note: 1 appearance in Lancashire Senior Cup, 1 appearance in Manchester Senior Cup)	0	34	0
Rochdale	1930–31	Third Division North	27	0	0	0	4 (Note: 2 appearances in Lancashire Senior Cup, 2 appearances in Manchester Senior Cup)	0	31	0
Rochdale	Total		58	0	1	0	6	0	65	0
Watford	1936–37	Third Division South	2	0	0	0	―		2	0
Career total			60	0	1	0	6	0	67	0
