= Billy Bertram =

English footballer

Personal information
- Full name: William Bertram
- Date of birth: 31 December 1897
- Place of birth: Brandon, England
- Date of death: 27 October 1962 (aged 64)
- Height: 5 ft 7 in (1.70 m)
- Position: Inside forward

Senior career*
Years	Team	Apps	(Gls)
1914–1919	Browney Colliery		
1919–1920	Durham City		
1920–1921	Newcastle United	3	(0)
1921–1922	Norwich City	25	(2)
1922–1923	Leadgate Park		
1923–1925	Durham City	100	(28)
1925–1931	Rochdale	198	(72)
1931	Accrington Stanley	0	(0)
- * Club domestic league appearances and goals

William Bertram (31 December 1897 – 27 October 1962) was an English professional footballer who played in the Football League for Rochdale, Durham City, Norwich City and Newcastle United as an inside forward.

== Personal life ==
Bertram served as a private in the Durham Light Infantry during the First World War.

== Career statistics ==
Appearances and goals by club, season and competition
Club	Season	League			FA Cup		Other		Total	
Club	Season	Division	Apps	Goals	Apps	Goals	Apps	Goals	Apps	Goals
Newcastle United	1919–20	First Division	3	0	0	0	—		3	0
Rochdale	1925–26	Third Division North	31	11	3	0	1 (Note: Appearances in Lancashire Senior Cup)	1	35	12
Rochdale	1926–27	Third Division North	35	13	1	1	0	0	36	14
Rochdale	1927–28	Third Division North	40	13	1	1	1	0	42	14
Rochdale	1928–29	Third Division North	31	18	1	0	1	0	33	18
Rochdale	1929–30	Third Division North	41	14	1	0	5 (Note: 3 appearances in Manchester Senior Cup, 2 appearances and 1 goal in Lancashire Senior Cup)	1	47	15
Rochdale	1930–31	Third Division North	20	3	2	0	2	1	24	4
Rochdale	Total		198	72	9	2	10	3	217	77
Career total			201	72	9	2	10	3	220	77
