= Tommy Flannigan =

Scottish footballer (1908–1981)

Personal information
- Full name: Thomas Flannigan
- Date of birth: 25 May 1908
- Place of birth: Edinburgh, Scotland
- Date of death: 23 May 1981 (aged 72)
- Place of death: Darlington, England
- Height: 5 ft 9 in (1.75 m)
- Position: Inside left

Senior career*
Years	Team	Apps	(Gls)
- Harp Athletic
192?–1926	Edinburgh Emmet		
1926–1927	Dundee	1	(0)
1927–1929	Stoke City	4	(0)
1929–1930	Hull City	2	(0)
1930–1931	Loughborough Corinthians		
1931	Darlington	0	(0)
1931	Rochdale	2	(0)
1932	Stafford Rangers		
1932–193?	Buxton		
1933–1934	Saint-Étienne	1	(0)
1934	Shrewsbury Town		
- * Club domestic league appearances and goals

Thomas Flannigan (25 May 1908 – 23 May 1981) was a Scottish footballer who played in the Scottish League for Dundee, in the English Football League for Stoke City, Hull City and Rochdale, and in the French Division 2 for Saint-Étienne. He was on the books of Darlington without playing for their first team, and played non-league football for Loughborough Corinthians, Stafford Rangers, Buxton and Shrewsbury Town. He played mainly at inside left, but was used anywhere across the forward line.

== Life and career ==
Flannigan was born in Edinburgh in 1908. He played football for Harp Athletic and Edinburgh Emmet before signing for Dundee in 1926, touted by the Dundee Evening Telegraph along with Jim Meagher and Andy Ramage as "lads who will make a capital inside trio in the near future". Flannigan was backup for Joe Cassidy in the 1926–27 season, and did not make his debut until the last First Division match of the campaign, on 30 April 1927. He played at inside left, alongside Ramage at centre forward, in a 3–0 win against Queen's Park. That proved to be his only appearance, as in early July he signed for English club Stoke City.

He spent his first season in the reserves before coming into the league side in December 1928 for a four-game run. On his debut, in a goalless draw away to Southampton, he had "about the best shot of the afternoon, a drive which flashed the ball just over the bar". The following week, the Staffordshire Sentinel suggested that Flannigan lacked stamina, then that his "neat touches were out of place" on Notts County's frozen pitch. During his fourth match, a clash of heads with a team-mate left him concussed. Described as a "clever dribbler" but "rather light of build", Flannigan made 24 appearances for Stoke's reserves in the Central League, but was not retained at the end of the season, and was sold to Hull City for a "considerable" fee, later reported as £500.

He made just two Second Division appearances during the 1929–30 season, and was transfer-listed at a fee of £750. There were no takers, so he spent the 1930–31 season in non-league football with Loughborough Corinthians of the Midland League. Eventually, the fee was reduced, and Flannigan attempted a return to the Football League with Darlington of the Third Division North. After a month with no first-team football, his registration was cancelled and he signed for another Northern Section club, Rochdale. He made his debut on 26 September 1931 in a 1–1 draw with Darlington, and played in the next match, but that was his last.

He resurfaced in February at Birmingham League club Stafford Rangers and made a debut for Buxton in the Cheshire County League in November, before trying his luck in French football with Saint-Étienne. He played one senior game in the inaugural season of Division 2, a 2–1 defeat at home to SO Biterrois on 31 December 1933. Flannigan's last club was Shrewsbury Town, after which he retired and took up hairdressing.

Flannigan died in Darlington, County Durham, in 1981 at the age of 72.

== Career statistics ==
Appearances and goals by club, season and competition
Club	Season	League			Cup (Note: Includes Scottish Cup, FA Cup, Coupe de France)		Total	
Club	Season	Division	Apps	Goals	Apps	Goals	Apps	Goals
Dundee	1926–27	Scottish Division One	1	0	0	0	1	0
Stoke City	1927–28	Second Division	0	0	0	0	0	0
Stoke City	1928–29	Second Division	4	0	0	0	4	0
Stoke City	Total		4	0	0	0	4	0
Hull City	1929–30	Second Division	2	0	0	0	2	0
Darlington	1931–32	Third Division North	0	0	0	0	0	0
Rochdale	1931–32	Third Division North	2	0	0	0	2	0
Saint-Étienne	1933–34	Division 2 Sud	1	0	0	0	1	0
Career total			10	0	0	0	10	0
