= Thomas Corcoran (footballer) =

English footballer

Personal information
- Date of birth: 1909
- Place of birth: Earlestown, England
- Position: Right back

Senior career*
Years	Team	Apps	(Gls)
- Atherton
1929–1930	Bradford City	3	(0)
- Rochdale
- * Club domestic league appearances and goals

Thomas Corcoran (born 1909) was an English professional footballer who played as a right back.

== Career ==
Born in Earlestown, Corcoran played for Atherton, Bradford City and Rochdale. For Bradford City he made 3 appearances in the Football League.

== Sources ==
- Frost, Terry (1988). Bradford City A Complete Record 1903-1988. Breedon Books Sport. ISBN 0-907969-38-0.
