= George Turnbull (footballer, born 1911) =

English footballer

Personal information
- Full name: George Edward Turnbull
- Date of birth: 25 May 1911
- Place of birth: Sunderland, England
- Date of death: 1996 (aged 84–85)
- Height: 5 ft 9 in (1.75 m)
- Positions: Centre forward; inside left

Senior career*
Years	Team	Apps	(Gls)
- Sunderland Forge
- Bank Head Albion
1930–1931	Rochdale	10	(2)
1931	Darlington	5	(1)
193?–1932	Bank Head Albion		
1932–193?	Shiney Row Swifts		
- Easington Colliery Welfare
- Sunderland Electrical Undertaking
- * Club domestic league appearances and goals

George Edward Turnbull (25 May 1911 – 1996) was an English footballer who played as a centre forward or inside left in the Football League for Rochdale and Darlington. He had trials with Newcastle United and Guildford City, and played non-league football for clubs including Sunderland Forge, Bank Head Albion, Shiney Row Swifts, Easington Colliery Welfare and Sunderland Electrical Undertaking.

== Life and career ==
Turnbull was born in Sunderland, which was then in County Durham. After a trial with Newcastle United early in the 1930–31 season, he signed for Rochdale. He played ten matches in the Third Division North, scoring twice, and was prolific in reserve-team matches, but after the club finished 21st out of 22 in the league and were obliged to seek re-election, he was one of many released in what the Northern Daily Mail called a "clean sweep of their players". He joined divisional rivals Darlington in August 1931, and scored once in five appearances at the beginning of the season, but the club cancelled his registration in October.

In the 1932–33 season, he played local football in the Sunderland area for Bank Head Albion, as well as for Wearside League clubs Shiney Row Swifts and Easington Colliery Welfare.

Turnbull died in 1996.
