= Andy Martin (footballer, born 1896) =

Scottish footballer

Andrew Fitzsimmons Martin (22 September 1896 – 1978) was a Scottish footballer who played league football as a wing half for Blackpool, Halifax Town, Rochdale, and Torquay United as well as non-league football for a number of other clubs.
