= William Cowan (footballer) =

English footballer

Personal information
- Full name: William Cowan
- Date of birth: 28 November 1900
- Place of birth: Gateshead, England
- Date of death: 1979 (aged 78–79)
- Position: Centre forward

Senior career*
Years	Team	Apps	(Gls)
?–1925	High Fell	?	(?)
1925–1927	Hull City	11	(8)
1927–1928	Blackpool	1	(0)
1928–1929	Chesterfield	7	(6)
1929–1930	York City	0	(0)
Total		19	(14)
- * Club domestic league appearances and goals

William Cowan (28 November 1900 – 1979) was an English footballer who played as a centre forward.

== Career ==
Born in Gateshead, Cowan played for High Fell before moving to the Football League with Hull City, scoring on his debut in a 4–1 victory over Nottingham Forest on 12 October 1925. His last appearance for the club came in a 5–2 defeat at Wolverhampton Wanderers on 15 January 1927 and he finished his Hull career with nine goals in 12 appearances in all competitions. He made one appearance for Blackpool during the 1927–28 season before going on to score six in seven league appearances for Chesterfield in the 1928–29 season. He was with York City during the 1929–30 season, the club's first in the Football League after being elected from the Midland League, but did not make any appearances for the club in any competitions. In his short career, he made 19 League appearances, in which he scored 14 goals.
