= Edmund Crawford =

English footballer and manager

Ted Crawford
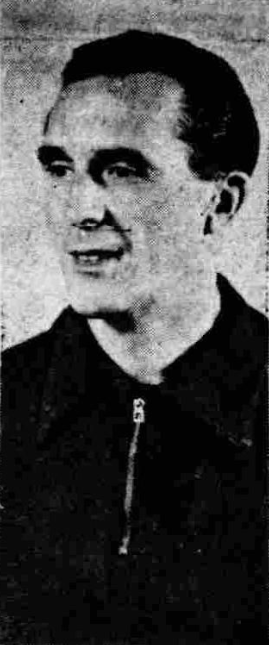

Personal information
- Full name: Edmund Crawford
- Date of birth: 31 October 1906
- Place of birth: Filey, England
- Date of death: 13 December 1977 (aged 71)
- Place of death: London, England
- Height: 6 ft 0 in (1.83 m)
- Position: Forward

Senior career*
Years	Team	Apps	(Gls)
- Scarborough
- Scarborough Penguins
1922–1923	Filey Town		
1929–1931	Filey Town		
1931–1932	Halifax Town		
1932–1933	Liverpool	8	(4)
1933–1945	Clapton Orient		

Managerial career
- 1946–1949: Degerfors IF
- 1949–1951: Bologna
- 1951–1952: Livorno
- 1955: AEK Athens
- 1956–1957: Barnet
- * Club domestic league appearances and goals

Edmond Crawford (31 October 1906 – 13 December 1977) was an English footballer and football manager.

== Playing career ==
Crawford started his career as an amateur when joining his two brothers at Filey Town in February 1922. He moved to Scarborough Penguins in 1923, then to Scarborough before returning to Filey Town for two seasons in 1929, where he set a local league record by scoring 141 goals in 73 matches. His first professional contract was at Halifax Town in 1931. He then signed for Liverpool where he scored 4 goals in 8 matches. In 1933, he joined Clapton Orient, where he ended his playing career. He played his last 6 years with an undiagnosed broken ankle.

== Managerial career ==
After the World War II, he started his managerial career in Sweden with Degerfors IF. He then went to Italy, at Bologna, as George Raynor told him there was a job. He then went to Livorno, AEK Athens and Barnet, and also later assisted at Crewe Alexandra.
