= Evan Hooker =

English footballer (1901–1962)

Evan Hooker (10 March 1901 – 1962) was an English footballer who played as a wing half for Stalybridge Celtic, Stockport County and Rochdale. He also played non-league football for various other clubs.
