= Sammy Beswick =

English footballer (1903–1966)

Personal information
- Full name: Samuel McAdam Beswick
- Date of birth: 3 August 1903
- Place of birth: Macclesfield, England
- Date of death: 15 December 1966 (aged 63)
- Place of death: Bournemouth, England
- Height: 5 ft 7 in (1.70 m)
- Position: Centre forward

Senior career*
| Years | Team | Apps | (Gls) |
| –1922 | Stockport County | | |
| 1922–1929 | Tranmere Rovers | 67 | (32) |
| 1929– | Rhyl | | |
| Total | | 67 | (32) |
- * Club domestic league appearances and goals

Samuel McAdam Beswick (8 March 1903 – 15 December 1966) was a footballer who played as a centre forward for Stockport County, Tranmere Rovers and Rhyl.
