= Billy Mays (footballer) =

Welsh footballer (1902–1959)

Albert William Mays (18 July 1902 – 1959) was a Welsh footballer. Born in Ynyshir, he played professionally for clubs including Bristol City, Merthyr Town, Wrexham and Walsall between 1923 and 1932, making a total of 160 Football League appearances. While with Merthyr Town, Mays supplemented his income by working in a coal mine. He also gained one cap for Wales, against Northern Ireland in 1929, a game in which he scored the opening Wales goal in a 2-2 draw.

His son, also called Albert, was also a professional footballer.
