= Thomas Moon =

English footballer (1900–1981)

Personal information
- Date of birth: 2 January 1900
- Place of birth: Preston, England
- Date of death: 19 January 1981 (aged 81)
- Position: Outside right

Senior career*
Years	Team	Apps	(Gls)
?	New Hall Lane Temperance	?	(?)
?	Dick, Kerr's	?	(?)
?	Horwich RMI	?	(?)
1923–?	Preston North End	0	(0)
?	Dick, Kerr's	?	(?)
1925	Southport	4	(1)
?	Dick, Kerr's	?	(?)
?	Chorley	?	(?)
?	Dick, Kerr's	?	(?)
1928–1929	Bradford City	47	(17)
?	Dick, Kerr's	?	(?)
1930–?	Barrow	28	(6)
1931	Wigan Borough^{[A]}	10	(1)
1931–?	Frickley Colliery	?	(?)
?	Drumcondra	?	(?)
?	Dick, Kerr's	?	(?)
- * Club domestic league appearances and goals

Thomas Moon (2 January 1900 – 19 January 1981) was an English professional footballer who played in the Football League playing for Preston North End, Southport, Bradford City and Wigan Borough. He played as an outside right.

== Playing career ==
Moon was born in Preston, Lancashire. He made his debut in the Football League with Southport. He was a nomadic player, representing a number of football league and non-league clubs. He returned many times to Dick, Kerr's football team during his career.

He joined Bradford City from Dick, Kerr's in September 1928. He made 47 league appearances for the club, scoring 17 goals, and also made 4 FA Cup appearances. He left the club in September 1929 to re-join Dick, Kerr's.

He began the 1931–32 season with Wigan Borough. After twelve matches, the club folded and its results were expunged from official records. Moon had played in ten of the league appearances, scoring once. Moon resumed his football career back in non-league with Frickley Colliery and had a spell in Ireland with Drumcondra before retiring.

== Notes ==
^{a} ^{b} Wigan Borough folded during the 1931–32 season following the match on 24 October 1931, a 5–0 defeat at Wrexham in which Oakes played.

== Sources ==
- Frost, Terry (1988). Bradford City A Complete Record 1903-1988. Breedon Books Sport. ISBN 0-907969-38-0.
