= Joe Johnson (footballer, born 1900) =

English footballer (1900–1976)

Personal information
- Full name: Joseph James Johnson
- Date of birth: 23 June 1900
- Place of birth: Wednesbury, England
- Date of death: 1976 (aged 75–76)
- Position: Inside forward

Senior career*
Years	Team	Apps	(Gls)
1919–1920	Bradley United		
1920–1921	Talbot Stead Tube Works		
1921–1922	Cannock Town		
1922–1925	Crystal Palace	29	(6)
1925–1926	Barnsley	14	(2)
1926–1928	West Ham United	15	(7)
1928–1929	Southend United	0	(0)
1929–1930	Walsall	0	(0)
1930–1931	Wigan Borough	30	(9)
1931–1932	Halifax Town	27	(6)
1932–1933	Accrington Stanley	26	(7)
1933	Cannock Town		
1933	Cradley Heath		
Total		141	(37)
- * Club domestic league appearances and goals

Joseph James Johnson (23 June 1900 – 1976) was an English footballer who played in the Football League for Accrington Stanley, Barnsley, Crystal Palace, Halifax Town, West Ham United and Wigan Borough.
