= Tom Mordue =

English footballer

Personal information
- Full name: Thomas Mordue
- Date of birth: 22 July 1905
- Place of birth: Horden, England
- Date of death: 1975 (aged 69–70)
- Position: Inside forward

Senior career*
Years	Team	Apps	(Gls)
1922–1923	Herrington Swifts		
1923–1924	Hull City	6	(0)
1924–1925	Horden Athletic		
1925–1926	Newcastle United	5	(2)
1926–1928	Sheffield United	7	(0)
1928–1931	Hartlepools United	101	(26)
1931–1932	Horden Colliery Welfare		
1932–1933	Shotton Colliery Welfare		
1933	Horden Coke Ovens		
Total		119	(28)
- * Club domestic league appearances and goals

Thomas Mordue (22 July 1905 – 1975) was an English footballer who played in the Football League for Hartlepools United, Hull City, Newcastle United and Sheffield United.
