= Reg Trotman =

English footballer (1906–1970)

Reginald Wilfred Trotman (10 July 1906 – 1970) was an English footballer who played as an inside forward for Bristol Rovers and Rochdale. He was also in the reserve team of Sheffield Wednesday, and played non-league football for various other clubs.
