= Bobby Mason (footballer, born 1901) =

English footballer

Personal information
- Full name: Robert Mason
- Date of birth: 13 May 1901
- Place of birth: Houghton-le-Spring, England
- Date of death: 1981 (aged 79–80)
- Position: Centre half

Senior career*
Years	Team	Apps	(Gls)
1921–1922	Whitburn		
1923–1925	Leeds United	15	(0)
1927–1928	Bristol Rovers	0	(0)
1928–1929	Hartlepools United	13	(1)
1929	West Stanley		
Total		28	(1)
- * Club domestic league appearances and goals

Robert Mason (13 May 1901 – 1981) was an English footballer who played in the Football League for Hartlepools United and Leeds United.
