= Bert Welch =

English footballer (born 1912)

Herbert Welch (born 1912) was an English footballer who played as a goalkeeper for Rochdale, as well as non-league football for various other clubs.<
