= Robert Pringle (footballer) =

English footballer

Personal information
- Date of birth: 1897
- Place of birth: Stockton, England
- Height: 5 ft 10 in (1.78 m)
- Position: Full back

Senior career*
Years	Team	Apps	(Gls)
- Middlesbrough
1922–1924	Bradford City	31	(0)
- Crewe Alexandra
Total		31	(0)
- * Club domestic league appearances and goals

Robert Pringle (born 1897) was an English professional footballer who played as a full back.

== Career ==
Born in Stockton, Pringle joined Bradford City from Middlesbrough in August 1922. He made 31 league appearances for the club, before moving to Crewe Alexandra in July 1924.

== Sources ==
- Frost, Terry (1988). Bradford City A Complete Record 1903-1988. Breedon Books Sport. ISBN 0-907969-38-0.
