= Harry Howlett =

English footballer

Harry William Alfred Howlett (23 June 1910 – 1989) was an English footballer who played as a centre forward for Rochdale and Nottingham Forest.
