= Jack Kennedy (footballer, born 1906) =

English footballer (1906–>1932)

John Kennedy

Personal information
- Date of birth: 8 Sept 1901 - Jan 1975
- Place of birth: Blyth, England
- Position: Inside left

Senior career*
Years	Team	Apps	(Gls)
- Blyth Spartans
–1930	Sheffield United		
1930–1932	Tranmere Rovers	65	(45)
1932–	Exeter City		
- Torquay United
- Blyth Spartans
- * Club domestic league appearances and goals

Jack Kennedy (1906 – after 1932) was an English footballer who played as an inside left for Blyth Spartans, Sheffield United, Tranmere Rovers, Exeter City and Torquay United.

Kennedy joined Torquay on 9 November 1933, to enable Torquay to field a side at Reading on 10 November. T. Walters also signed for Torquay from Exeter on the same date and for same reason. Both played on 10 November.
