= Frank Hargreaves =

English footballer (1902–1987)

Frank Hargreaves (17 November 1902 – 1987) was an English footballer who played as an inside forward for Oldham Athletic, Everton and Rochdale. He also played reserve team and non-league football for various other clubs.
