= Evan Jenkins (footballer) =

Welsh footballer

Personal information
- Full name: Evan Thomas Jenkins
- Date of birth: 26 June 1906
- Place of birth: Ynyshir, Wales
- Date of death: 1990 (aged 83–84)
- Height: 5 ft 7 1/2 in (1.71 m)
- Position: Winger

Senior career*
Years	Team	Apps	(Gls)
1928–1930	Lincoln City	30	(12)
1930–1933	Burnley	66	(16)
1933–1934	Lincoln City	14	(1)
1934	Barnsley	0	(0)
1934–1935	York City	28	(10)
- * Club domestic league appearances and goals

Evan Thomas Jenkins (26 June 1906 – 1990) was a Welsh professional footballer who played as a winger.
