= Edward Milsom =

English rugby league footballer

Playing information
- Position: Stand-off, Scrum-half
Club
Years	Team	Pld	T	G	FG	P
1895–98	Wakefield Trinity	42	0	0	0	0

Edward Milsom was a professional rugby league footballer who played in the 1890s. He played at club level for Wakefield Trinity, as a stand-off or scrum-half. He played stand-off in Wakefield Trinity's first ever match in the Northern Union (now the Rugby Football League), the 0-11 defeat by Bradford F.C. during the inaugural 1895–96 season at Park Avenue, Bradford on Saturday 7 September 1895.
