= Gordon Bell (footballer) =

English footballer (1906–1979)

Personal information
- Full name: Gordon Bell
- Date of birth: 9 January 1906
- Place of birth: Sunderland, Tyne and Wear, England
- Date of death: 1979 (aged 72–73)
- Position: Outside left

Senior career*
Years	Team	Apps	(Gls)
- Newcastle Swifts
- Chilton Colliery Recreation
1922–1923	Darlington	0	(0)
1925–1927	Durham City	0	(0)
1927–1928	Carlisle United		
1928–1929	Leeds United		
1929–1930	Wrexham	24	(7)
1930–1931	Swansea Town	19	(6)
1931–1932	Carlisle United	1	(0)
- Consett
- * Club domestic league appearances and goals

Gordon Bell (9 January 1906 – 1979) was an English professional footballer who played as an outside left. He made appearances in the English Football League for Wrexham, Swansea Town and Carlisle United.

He was also on the books at football league teams Darlington, Durham City and Leeds United, however didn't make an appearance for any of them.
