= Thomas Bailey (footballer, born 1904) =

Welsh footballer (1904–1983)

Thomas William Bailey (22 August 1904 – 1983) was a Welsh footballer who played as a wing half for Rochdale. He was also on the reserve team of Merthyr Town.
