= Francis Chorlton =

English footballer (1908–1984)

Personal information
- Full name: Francis Chorlton
- Date of birth: February 27, 1908
- Date of death: 1984
- Position: Winger

Senior career*
Years	Team	Apps	(Gls)
- Rochdale
- * Club domestic league appearances and goals

Francis Chorlton (27 February 1908 – 1984) was an English footballer who played as a winger. He is known for his appearances in the Football League for Rochdale during the interwar period.

== Career ==
Francis Chorlton played as a winger and was associated with Rochdale, competing in the Football League during the early 20th century. He made appearances for the club in league competition, contributing as an attacking wide player during a period in which Rochdale competed in the lower divisions of English football.
