= Eric Silverwood =

English footballer

Eric Silverwood (25 July 1906 – 1973) was an English footballer who played as an inside forward for Rochdale.
