= George Lewins =

English footballer (1906–1991)

George Albert Lewins (16 July 1906 – 1991) was an English footballer who played as a full back for Rochdale, Wigan Borough and Tranmere Rovers. He was also in the reserve teams of Newcastle United, Reading and Manchester City, and played non-league football for various other clubs.
