= David Cowan (footballer, born 1910) =

Scottish footballer

Personal information
- Full name: David Cowan
- Date of birth: 30 November 1910
- Place of birth: West Carron, Scotland
- Position: Inside left

Youth career
- Alva Albion Rovers

Senior career*
Years	Team	Apps	(Gls)
1930–1931	Rochdale		
1931–1935	Stenhousemuir		
1934–1937	Falkirk		
1936–1937	Arbroath		
1939–1940	Dumbarton	2	(1)
- * Club domestic league appearances and goals

David Cowan (born 30 November 1910) was a Scottish footballer who played for Rochdale, Stenhousemuir, Falkirk, Arbroath and Dumbarton.
