= Tommy Atkin =

English footballer (1906–1986)

Personal information
- Full name: Thomas Lowes Atkin
- Date of birth: 19 August 1906
- Place of birth: Darlington, England
- Date of death: 1986 (aged 79–80)
- Place of death: Darlington, England
- Height: 5 ft 7 in (1.70 m)
- Position: Outside right

Senior career*
Years	Team	Apps	(Gls)
1925−1927	Darlington	0	(0)
1927−1928	Bolton Wanderers	0	(0)
1928−1932	Doncaster Rovers	99	(6)
1932−1934	Gateshead	54	(16)
1934−1936	Darlington	26	(3)
1936−1937	Wigan Athletic	41	(9)
1937−1938	Peterborough United	39	(8)
- * Club domestic league appearances and goals

Thomas Lowes Atkin (19 August 1906 − 1986) was an English footballer who played as an outside right for several clubs.

== Playing career ==
Born in Darlington, Tommy Atkin started out with his home town club Darlington in 1925 who were in the Second Division, having their highest ever League finish that season. After the 1926−27 season when Darlington were relegated, he was transferred to First Division club Bolton Wanderers.

The following season, in 1928, he went to Doncaster Rovers in Division Three (North), the division in which he'd play for the next eight seasons. He was at Doncaster for four years, where he played 105 league and cup games. Following this, Atkin moved back to the North East playing for Gateshead for two seasons, and then in 1934 returning to play for Darlington for a further two seasons.

He played for Wigan Athletic during the 1936–37 season, playing 41 games and scoring nine goals in the Cheshire League. He moved to Peterborough for their 1937−38 season in the Midland League, scoring 10 times in 42 league and cup appearances.

Atkin married in 1936, and died in 1986 in his native Darlington.
