= Matt Jenkinson =

English footballer

Personal information
- Full name: Matthew Jenkinson
- Date of birth: 31 October 1906
- Place of birth: Filey, East Riding of Yorkshire, England
- Date of death: 4 August 1979 (aged 72)
- Place of death: Filey, North Yorkshire, England
- Height: 5 ft 8 in (1.73 m)
- Positions: Outside forward; inside forward

Senior career*
Years	Team	Apps	(Gls)
–1930	Scarborough		
1930–1932	York City	18	(6)
1932–1933	Scarborough		
1933–1934	York City	54	(14)
1934	Filey Town		
1934–1935	Scarborough		
1935–	Filey Town		
Total		72	(20)
- * Club domestic league appearances and goals

Matthew Jenkinson (31 October 1906 – 4 August 1979), also known as Sailor Jenkinson, was an English professional footballer who played as an outside forward or an inside forward in the Football League for York City and in non-League football for Scarborough and Filey Town.
