= Norman Wright (footballer) =

English footballer (1908–1974)

Personal information
- Full name: Norman Wright
- Date of birth: 27 December 1908
- Place of birth: Ushaw Moor, England
- Date of death: 30 January 1974 (aged 65)
- Position: Winger

Senior career*
Years	Team	Apps	(Gls)
1926–1927	Esh Winning		
1927–1930	Grimsby Town	17	(3)
1930–1931	Crewe Alexandra	30	(4)
1931–1933	Accrington Stanley	78	(21)
1933–1935	Manchester City	3	(1)
1935–1936	Watford	21	(3)
1936–193?	South Shields		
- * Club domestic league appearances and goals

Norman Wright (27 December 1908 – 30 January 1974) was an English professional footballer who played as a winger.
