= Albert George Latham =

"Old Tyneside" by Albert G. Latham, 1913

Albert George Latham (1864–1940) was the first Professor of Modern Languages at Newcastle University. He was educated at the Universities of London, Bonn, Caen, Paris and Florence and joined the staff in 1893 as a lecturer in French and Italian. In 1899, he married the daughter of A D Murray, editor of the Newcastle Daily Journal (Mrs Latham later became an author of books for children and also took charge of ‘Children’s Hour’, as ‘Auntie Katie’ in local transmissions for children from the local Newcastle BBC radio station). He was a specialist in French and German literature and also an accomplished translator for several European languages, mainly German, French and Italian, translating, among other things, choral works set by his colleague at Newcastle, W G Whittaker. In 1910/11, he was appointed as the first full professor of Modern Languages, leading to Centenary Celebrations at the School of Modern Languages at Newcastle in 2011. Latham’s publications included The Oxford Treasury of French Literature. His translation of Goethe's Faust for the Everyman's Library edition was the one most English-speaking readers in the first half of the twentieth century would have been familiar with. He retired in 1926.
