= Tom Tippett =

English footballer

Personal information
- Full name: Thomas Tippett
- Date of birth: 10 July 1904
- Place of birth: Gateshead, England
- Date of death: 1997 (aged 92–93)
- Position: Forward

Youth career
- Twizzell United

Senior career*
Years	Team	Apps	(Gls)
1925–1926	Middlesbrough	0	(0)
1926	Craghead United		
1926	Newcastle United	0	(0)
1927–1929	Doncaster Rovers	31	(4)
1929–1931	Rochdale	70	(47)
1931–1933	Port Vale	39	(11)
1933–1936	West Ham United	27	(10)
Total		167	(72)
- * Club domestic league appearances and goals

Thomas Tippett (10 July 1904 – 1997) was an English footballer who played as a forward for Middlesbrough, Craghead United, Newcastle United, Doncaster Rovers, Rochdale, Port Vale, and West Ham United.

== Career ==
Tippett played for Twizzell United, Middlesbrough, Craghead United (in three spells), Newcastle United and, after having trials with Stoke City and Grimsby Town, joined Doncaster Rovers and then Rochdale. He joined Port Vale in June 1931. He scored eight goals in 31 Second Division games in the 1931–32 season but was criticized for his lack of goals. He fell ill in August 1932 and failed to regain his first-team spot, scoring three goals in only nine league and cup games in the 1932–33 season. He left the Old Recreation Ground and transferred to West Ham United in May 1933.

== Career statistics ==
Appearances and goals by club, season and competition
Club	Season	League			FA Cup		Total	
Club	Season	Division	Apps	Goals	Apps	Goals	Apps	Goals
Middlesbrough	1925–26	Second Division	0	0	0	0	0	0
Newcastle United	1926–27	First Division	0	0	0	0	0	0
Doncaster Rovers	1927–28	Third Division North	12	0	0	0	12	0
Doncaster Rovers	1928–29	Third Division North	19	4	0	0	19	4
Doncaster Rovers	Total		31	4	0	0	31	4
Rochdale	1929–30	Third Division North	30	29	1	0	31	29
Rochdale	1930–31	Third Division North	40	18	1	0	41	18
Rochdale	Total		70	47	2	0	72	47
Port Vale	1931–32	Second Division	31	8	2	0	33	8
Port Vale	1932–33	Second Division	8	3	1	0	9	3
Port Vale	Total		39	11	3	0	42	11
West Ham United	1933–34	Second Division	21	8	1	0	22	8
West Ham United	1934–35	Second Division	4	2	0	0	4	2
West Ham United	1935–36	Second Division	2	0	0	0	2	0
West Ham United	Total		27	10	1	0	28	10
Career total			167	72	6	0	173	72
