= George Power (footballer) =

English footballer (1910–1977)

George Francis Power (16 March 1910 – 1977) was an English footballer who played as a goalkeeper for Rochdale. He was also on the reserve team of Manchester City and played non-league football for various other clubs.
