= Tommy Hogg =

English footballer, referee, and teacher

Personal information
- Date of birth: 21 March 1908
- Place of birth: Brampton, England
- Date of death: 26 October 1965 (aged 57)
- Place of death: Bradford, England
- Position: Forward

Senior career*
Years	Team	Apps	(Gls)
1930–1931	Bradford Park Avenue	3	(0)
1932	Rochdale	10	(1)
- * Club domestic league appearances and goals

Thomas Hogg (21 March 1908 – 26 October 1965) was an English professional footballer who played as a forward for Bradford Park Avenue and Rochdale. He later worked as a referee and a teacher.
