= Billy Sellars =

English footballer

Personal information
- Full name: William Sellars
- Date of birth: 7 October 1907
- Place of birth: Hyde Park, England
- Date of death: 1987 (aged 79 or 80)
- Position: Winger

Senior career*
Years	Team	Apps	(Gls)
1927–1932	Rotherham United	165	(36)
1932–1933	Southport	39	(11)
1933–1934	Burnley	19	(2)
1934–1935	Bradford Park Avenue	2	(1)
1935–1936	Lincoln City	33	(2)
- * Club domestic league appearances and goals

William Sellars (7 October 1907 – 1987) was an English professional footballer who played as a winger.
