= Albert Cooke (footballer) =

English footballer

Albert Cooke (11 April 1908 – 1988) was an English footballer who played as a wing half for Rochdale, Notts County (reserves), Hull City and Halifax Town.
