= Percy Hellyer =

English footballer (1910–2001)

Percival Charles Hellyer (5 March 1910 – 2001) was an English footballer who played as a winger for Rochdale. He also played reserve team and non-league football for various other clubs.
