= Walter Lax =

English footballer

Personal information
- Full name: Walter Lax
- Date of birth: 22 March 1912
- Place of birth: Gainsborough, Lincolnshire, England
- Date of death: 1967 (aged 55)
- Position: Outside left

Senior career*
Years	Team	Apps	(Gls)
–	Albion Works		
1930–1931	Lincoln City	45	(11)
1931–1933	Blackpool	25	(0)
1933	Coventry City	0	(0)
1933–1934	York City	28	(5)
–	Scunthorpe & Lindsey United		
–	Lysaght's Sports		
- * Club domestic league appearances and goals

Walter Lax (22 March 1912 – 1967) was an English footballer who scored 16 goals from 98 appearances in the Football League playing for Lincoln City, Blackpool and York City. He played as an outside left. He was also on the books of Coventry City without representing that club in the league, and played non-league football for Scunthorpe & Lindsey United as well as a couple of works teams.
