= James Parton (footballer) =

English footballer

James Parton (3 December 1902 – 1981) was an English footballer who played as a wing half for Barrow and Rochdale. He also played non-league football for various other clubs.
