= Guyan Porter =

British artist

Guyan Porter (born 1971, Aberdeen, Scotland) is a visual artist living in Sussex, England, and working internationally. His work encompasses installation, sculpture, painting, architectural and public interventions and studio-based work that explores 'the sociological and psychological foundations of belief'. With a multi-disciplinary approach, his work is research led and has explored diverse subjects such as statistical data, democracy, early human categorisation and conflicts between internal and external authorities. Mixing traditional forms with processes of political engagement, Porter draws on conceptual and installation art while referencing pioneering social scientists such as Daniel Dennett and Stanley Milgram.

In 2001 he was a founding member and first President of the Scottish Artists Union, the first ever Trade Union for visual and applied artists in the United Kingdom.

== Early life and education ==
Guyan Porter was born in Aberdeen, Scotland in 1971. He went to the Aberdeen Grammar School before studying at the Gray's School of Art between 1989 and 1993, gaining a BA Honours in Fine Art and Sculpture.

Porter set up his first studio in Glasgow in 1994, organising, exhibiting in and curating artist led projects and multi media arts events.

== Notable work ==
In 1999 Porter organised an exhibition called Vault at The Arches in Glasgow, where the work of ten visual artists, musicians, DJs. performers and a classic ensemble was combined in a week of multi media events. In The Glaswegian, Porter explained: "We're bringing art, music and performance together in the unusual spaces the Arches give us."

In the same year Porter carried out a residency in Russia as part of the Glasgow City Council Cultural Twinning Programme. Renowned Scottish Artist Ian Hughes said: "I have known Guyan and his work for over 15 years. We were both Glasgow District Council's artists-in-residence in Rostov-on-Don, Russia in 1999. Guyan is one of those rare artists who pursue their vision, despite the contemporary artistic vogue for cultivated superficiality, with ruthlessly focused intensity. He never shys away from the 'difficult', morally challenging themes of the human condition. Yet, all his artworks have a delicacy and beauty that shows redemption is possible through human creative self-analysis. His work is still as relevant today as it was 15 years ago. It will continue to be so"

In 2002 he produced "Three Imaginary Views", a triptych of pressed steel disks, etched, and coated with lacquer, partially obscuring meteorological maps of the Arctic, referencing geo-political divisions of oceanic territories and causal relationships between oceanic pollution and increasing climate instability.

In 2003 he began a series of paintings forming an installation of diagrammatic charts. Based on administrative diagrams the paintings would sample statistical information on behaviour, environment, life style, addiction, crime, politics and economic activity. "Genetic Stereotype" was first shown in 2014 in the Future Dreaming exhibition, a multi media project exploring the impact of propaganda on individuals, communities and young adults facing the future.

Gender Bender (2007) was a temporary public art project transforming a steel container into an 'alien art object'. Painted in deep pink, the piece explored how identity and gender have been traditionally ascribed to objects, architecture, spaces and colour, and the way in which people have come to use these gendered descriptions.

In 2009 Porter and artist Will Foster showed - "Subject To Change Without Notice" - a project that; " temporarily transformed into publicly accessible centres for researching, reconsidering and re-presenting the enormity of small print and ambiguous text that floods contemporary society." The project opened at the Centre for Contemporary Arts, for Glasgow International, and went on to create a series of exhibits and events at Akbank, Istanbul. The artist Banu Cennetoğlu held a conference on the themes of the work as part of the project. The exhibition was curated by Basak Senova.

In 2016 he took part in the group exhibition The New Immortals at the Phoenix in Brighton. Porter's work, De Conditioning Chamber, was a participatory project comprising a pre-fabricated building housing an experimental device. Participants entered one at a time, experiencing 'an environment testing two human tendencies the Sussex-via-Glasgow artist takes particular interest in: deeply-held beliefs and mortality.'

According to curator Sheila McGregor; "Systems of belief are central to the work of Guyan Porter, whose art takes place across a range of media in ways that respond to site and context.... , how secure is our understanding of where we have come from, let alone where we might be going to next? Like its companion piece, Porter’s De Conditioning Chamber, with its challenging message, seems designed to make us question the basis of what we know and what we believe."

The exhibition included what Porter claimed was the only complete Neanderthal skull anywhere in the world.

== Politics and Activism ==
Being involved in lobbying and campaigning on social and environmental issues from the early 1990s, Porter was a founder member and first President of the Scottish Artists Union, the first ever Trade Union for visual and applied artists in the United Kingdom. He was renowned for campaigning for artists and the arts.

As an artist Porter has made work in politicised contexts, such as with the piece; Sri Lanka Portraits. In an article by Kai-Oi Jay Yung, Porter said: "There must be more value lurking somewhere? ... the residency I did was complex." "...a war not really reported in the western press... has escalated dramatically." According to Yung: "Guyan Porter has been making connections throughout the world... travelling extensively ever since his 1998 residency to Russia. Travelling itself has become critical to understanding diverse art contexts and cultural settings, enabling him to explore unorthodox environments".

According to renowned cartoonist Terry Anderson: "Guyan is a passionate and articulate artist whose commitment to social justice is evident in his visual arts practice as well as activism."
