= Harry Briggs (footballer, born 1904) =

English footballer

Personal information
- Full name: Harold Briggs
- Date of birth: 1904
- Place of birth: Middlesbrough, England
- Position: Winger

Senior career*
Years	Team	Apps	(Gls)
1925–1927	Darlington	6	(0)
1927	Luton Town	2	(0)
1927	Newark Town		
1928–1929	Hartlepools United	18	(3)
1930–1931	Barrow	35	(7)
1931	Crook Town		
Total		61	(10)
- * Club domestic league appearances and goals

Harold Briggs (1904–unknown) was an English footballer who played in the Football League for Barrow, Darlington, Hartlepools United and Luton Town.
