= Norman Proctor =

English footballer

Personal information
- Full name: Norman Proctor
- Date of birth: 11 May 1896
- Place of birth: Alnwick, England
- Date of death: 1947 (aged 50–51)
- Position: Winger

Senior career*
Years	Team	Apps	(Gls)
1919–1920	Spen Black & White		
1920–1921	Scotswood		
1921–1922	Blyth Spartans		
1922–1923	Rotherham County	22	(1)
1923–1924	West Ham United	7	(1)
1924–1925	Leicester City	5	(0)
1925–1927	Tranmere Rovers	56	(13)
1927–1931	Halifax Town	126	(3)
1931–1933	Workington		
1933	Newbiggin West End		
Total		216	(18)
- * Club domestic league appearances and goals

Norman Proctor (11 May 1896 – 1947) was an English footballer who played in the Football League for Halifax Town, Leicester City, Rotherham County, Tranmere Rovers and West Ham United.
