= Phil Hope (footballer) =

English footballer

Philip Hope (24 April 1897 – 1969) was an English footballer who played as a full back for Norwich City, Blackburn Rovers, Southend United, Clapton Orient and Rochdale. He also played non-league football for various other clubs.
