= Tom Lindsay (footballer) =

Scottish footballer (1903–1979)

Thomas Lindsay (11 March 1903 – 1979) was a Scottish footballer who played league football as a winger for Reading, Wigan Borough, Rochdale, Watford, New Brighton and Southport, as well as non-league football for a number of other clubs.
