= John Ascroft =

English footballer

Personal information
- Full name: John Herbert Ascroft
- Date of birth: 2 February 1907
- Place of birth: Bebington, England
- Date of death: 1990 (aged 83)
- Place of death: Cumbria, England
- Position: Outside left

Senior career*
Years	Team	Apps	(Gls)
- Connah's Quay & Shotton
- Flint Town United
1926	Oldham Athletic	0	(0)
- Flint Town
1927	Arsenal	0	(0)
1927–1929	Bangor City		
	Wrexham	10	(6)
- Workington
- Runcorn
- * Club domestic league appearances and goals

John Herbert Ascroft (2 February 1907 – 1990) was an English professional footballer who played as an outside left. He made appearance in the English Football League for Wrexham. He also was on the books of EFL clubs Oldham Athletic and Arsenal but never made an appearance for either club.

== Reviews ==
The Football Gazette (South Shields) wrote about Ascroft:

Wrexham are not going to miss Gunson, their goalgetting left winger, so very much if John Herbert Ascroft repeats the delightful form he displayed against Stockport County a week ago, for apart from scoring this youngster was a real live wire in all he did. He played with the Bangor City club last season and there attracted quite a lot of attention, but did not wish to go far from North Wales. Wrexham have quite a good opinion of him.
