= Jack Brierley (footballer) =

English footballer (1904–1986)

John Brierley (8 September 1904 – 1986) was an English footballer who played as an inside forward for Rochdale. He was also in the reserve teams of Manchester United and Oldham Athletic and played non-league football for various other clubs.
