= Thomas Warburton (footballer) =

English footballer (1910–1985)

Thomas Charnley Warburton (11 September 1910 – 1985) was an English footballer who played as a winger for Rochdale.
