= Len Crompton =

English footballer

Personal information
- Full name: Leonard Crompton
- Date of birth: 26 March 1902
- Place of birth: Tottington, Lancashire, England
- Date of death: 1966
- Position: Goalkeeper

Senior career*
Years	Team	Apps	(Gls)
1922–24	Rossendale United	38	(0)
1924–1927	Blackpool	88	(0)
	Lancaster Town	?	(?)
1929	Rochdale	11	(0)
1930–1931	Barnsley	17	(0)
1931	Norwich City	0	(0)
1933	Rossendale United	8	(0)
- * Club domestic league appearances and goals

Leonard Compton (26 March 1902 – after 1930) was an English professional footballer. A goalkeeper, he played in the Football League for Blackpool, Rochdale, Barnsley and Norwich City.
