= David Murray (soccer, born 1901) =

South African soccer player and coach

Personal information
- Full name: David William James Murray
- Date of birth: 2 August 1901
- Place of birth: Wynberg
- Date of death: 1992
- Position: Inside forward

Senior career*
| Years | Team | Apps | (Gls) |
| 1920 | Clyde (Cape Town) | | |
| 1921 | Western Province | | |
| 1922 | Wynberg | | |
| 1925-1926 | Everton | 3 | (1) |
| 1926-1928 | Bristol City | 16 | (0) |
| 1928-1930 | Bristol Rovers | 39 | (12) |
| 1930-1931 | Swindon Town | 1 | (0) |
| 1931-1932 | Rochdale | 22 | (3) |
| 1933 | Bangor City | | |
| 1936 | YMCA Jersey | | |
| Total | | 71 | (16) |

Managerial career
- 1936: Jersey
- * Club domestic league appearances and goals

David William James Murray (2 August 1901 – 1992) was a South African-born professional footballer and coach who played for Bristol Rovers, Everton, Swindon Town, and Rochdale before becoming the coach of the Jersey official football team.
