= William Blackburn (footballer) =

English footballer (1911–1979)

William Blackburn (10 March 1911– 1979) was an English footballer who played as a full back for Rochdale. He was also on the books of Huddersfield Town and played non-league football for various other clubs.
