= Ed Robson =

English footballer

Personal information
- Full name: Edward Riddell Robson
- Date of birth: 21 August 1890
- Place of birth: Allendale, Northumberland, England
- Date of death: 1977 (aged 86–87)
- Place of death: Hexham, England
- Position: Goalkeeper

Senior career*
Years	Team	Apps	(Gls)
1913–1914	Gateshead		
1914–1919	Watford		
1919–1922	Portsmouth	75	(0)
1922–1924	Sunderland	38	(0)
1924–1926	Swansea Town	29	(0)
1926–1928	Wrexham	69	(0)
1928–1929	Grimsby Town	0	(0)
1929	Rochdale	12	(0)
- * Club domestic league appearances and goals

Edward Riddell Robson (21 August 1890 – 1977) was an English professional footballer who played as a goalkeeper for Sunderland.
