= John Watson (footballer, born 1906) =

Scottish footballer (1906–1973)

Personal information
- Full name: John Innes Watson
- Date of birth: 24 June 1906
- Place of birth: Aberdeen, Scotland
- Date of death: 1973 (aged 66–67)
- Position: Wing-half

Senior career*
Years	Team	Apps	(Gls)
1926–1927	Aberdeen Richmond		
1927–1931	Hull City	47	(0)
Total		47	(0)
- * Club domestic league appearances and goals

John Innes Watson (24 June 1906 – 1973) was a Scottish footballer who played in the Football League for Hull City.
