= Bill Bocking =

English footballer (1902–1985)

Personal information
- Full name: William Bocking
- Date of birth: 11 June 1902
- Place of birth: Stockport, England
- Date of death: 1985 (aged 82–83)
- Height: 5 ft 11 in (1.80 m)
- Position: Full-back

Senior career*
Years	Team	Apps	(Gls)
1922–1924	Hyde United		
1924–1931	Stockport County	262	(6)
1931–1934	Everton	15	(0)
1934–1938	Stockport County	104	(0)
Total		381	(6)
- * Club domestic league appearances and goals

William Bocking (11 June 1902 – 1985) was an English footballer who played in the Football League for Everton and Stockport County.
