= Harry Platt (footballer) =

English footballer (1908–1993)

Harold Platt (11 December 1908 – 1993) was an English footballer who played as a wing half for Rochdale. He also played non-league football for various other clubs.
