= Michael Patterson (English footballer) =

English footballer

Personal information
- Date of birth: 1905
- Place of birth: South Shields, England
- Position: Inside forward

Senior career*
Years	Team	Apps	(Gls)
- The Dragon
- Boldon Villa
- Boldon Colliery Welfare
1926–1927	Bradford City	11	(1)
- Doncaster Rovers
- Barnsley
1931	Southport	2	(0)
- Shelbourne
- Shamrock Rovers
- Frickley Colliery
- Pilkington Recreation
Total		13+	(1+)
- * Club domestic league appearances and goals

Michael Patterson (born 1905) was an English professional footballer who played as an inside forward.

== Career ==
Born in South Shields, Patterson spent his early career with The Dragon, Boldon Villa and Boldon Colliery Welfare. He moved from Boldon Colliery Welfare to Bradford City in March 1926, making 11 league appearances for the club, before moving to Doncaster Rovers in July 1927. He later played for Barnsley, Southport, Shelbourne, Shamrock Rovers, Frickley Colliery and Pilkington Recreation. At Southport he made 2 league appearances between September and October 1931.

== Sources ==
- Frost, Terry (1988). Bradford City A Complete Record 1903-1988. Breedon Books Sport. ISBN 0-907969-38-0.
