= Albert Latham (footballer) =

English footballer (1904–1982)

Albert Latham (24 September 1904 – 1982) was a right half born in Hucknall, Nottinghamshire, who began his footballing career with Bleakhall United in 1924 before moving to Hucknall Town in 1925. In July 1926 he signed amateur forms with Nottingham Forest, spending the 1926-27 season on their books while also turning out for Newark Town. However, he never broke into Forest’s first team and, in June 1927, joined Wolverhampton Wanderers as a professional. His time at Molineux was spent in the reserves, again without a senior appearance.

In July 1928 Latham signed for Accrington Stanley of the Third Division (North), making his Football League debut that August against Carlisle United. He was a regular throughout the 1928-29 campaign, but lost his place in January 1930 and made only a handful of appearances thereafter. After scoring 3 goals in 58 games for Stanley, he joined Rochdale in August 1930.

At Rochdale he found opportunities limited, netting once in 8 appearances before moving into non-league football with Hurst at the end of 1930. A year later, in September 1931, he returned to the League with York City, but was released without making a first-team appearance. In the summer of 1932 he joined Barnoldswick Town, then moved to Fleetwood in 1933 where he spent two seasons. Spells with Clitheroe (1935) and Morecambe (1936–1938) followed, before he retired from playing in 1938.
