= Harry Kitching =

English footballer

Personal information
- Full name: Harry Kitching
- Date of birth: 2 August 1905
- Place of birth: Grimsby Lincolnshire, England
- Date of death: 22 January 1970 (aged 64)
- Place of death: Cheshire, England
- Position: Forward

Senior career*
Years	Team	Apps	(Gls)
–	Municipal College		
1923–1926	Grimsby Town	16	(1)
–	Leeds University		
–	Boston Town		
–	Worksop Town		
1928–1931	Lincoln City	58	(28)
1931–1932	Tranmere Rovers	5	(0)
1932–1936	New Brighton	39	(7)
- * Club domestic league appearances and goals

Harry Kitching (2 August 1905 – 22 January 1970) was an English footballer who scored 36 goals in 118 appearances in the Football League playing for Grimsby Town, Lincoln City, Tranmere Rovers and New Brighton. He played as a forward.

Kitching worked as a schoolmaster even during his playing career.
