= Billy Hick =

English footballer (1903–1972)

Personal information
- Full name: William Morris Hick
- Date of birth: 13 February 1903
- Place of birth: Beamish, England
- Date of death: 1972 (aged 68–69)
- Position: Forward

Senior career*
| Years | Team | Apps | (Gls) |
| 1920–1921 | Consett Celtic | | |
| 1921–1922 | Hartlepools United | 1 | (0) |
| 1922–1923 | South Shields | 0 | (0) |
| 1923–1925 | Middlesbrough | 16 | (7) |
| 1925–1928 | Southend United | 106 | (70) |
| 1928–1929 | Bristol City | 10 | (1) |
| 1929 | Exeter City | 16 | (8) |
| 1929 | Grays Athletic | | |
| 1929–1930 | Scunthorpe & Lindsey United | | |
| 1930–1931 | Notts County | 0 | (0) |
| 1931–1932 | Rotherham United | 47 | (36) |
| Total | | 196 | (122) |
- * Club domestic league appearances and goals

William Morris Hick (13 February 1903 – 1972) was an English footballer who played in the Football League for Bristol City, Exeter City, Hartlepools United, Middlesbrough, Rotherham United and Southend United.
