= Jacob Parsons =

English footballer

Personal information
- Full name: Jacob Parsons
- Date of birth: 27 February 1903
- Place of birth: Barrow-in-Furness, England
- Date of death: 1953 (aged 49–50)
- Position: Forward

Senior career*
Years	Team	Apps	(Gls)
1926	Whitehaven Athletic		
1927–1928	Southport	4	(3)
1928–1929	Barrow	30	(15)
1929–1930	Accrington Stanley	15	(12)
1930–1931	Exeter City	3	(0)
1931–1932	Thames	4	(0)
1932–1933	Mansfield Town	2	(0)
1933	Rotherham United	0	(0)
- * Club domestic league appearances and goals

Jacob Parsons (27 February 1903 – 1953) was an English professional footballer who played in the Football League for Accrington Stanley, Barrow, Exeter City, Mansfield Town, Southport and Thames.
