= Bernard Parden =

English footballer

Personal information
- Full name: Bernard Parden
- Date of birth: 13 April 1907
- Place of birth: Barnsley, South Yorkshire, England
- Position: Centre forward

Senior career*
Years	Team	Apps	(Gls)
- Worksop Town
1930–1932	Wrexham	12	(9)
- Rhyl Athletic
- Denaby United
- * Club domestic league appearances and goals

Bernard Parden (13 April 1907 – date of death unknown) was an English professional footballer who played as a forward. He made appearances in the English football league for Wrexham in the 1930s.

He also played for Worksop Town, Rhyl Athletic and Denaby United.
