= Bobby Smith (footballer, born 1900s) =

Scottish footballer

Personal information
- Full name: Robert Smith
- Date of birth: c. 1907
- Place of birth: Kirkcaldy, Scotland
- Height: 5 ft 9 1/2 in (1.77 m)
- Position: Inside forward

Youth career
- –1929: Raith Rovers

Senior career*
Years	Team	Apps	(Gls)
1929–1937	Doncaster Rovers	264	(35)
- * Club domestic league appearances and goals

Robert Smith was a Scottish footballer who played as an inside forward mainly for Doncaster Rovers.

== Playing career ==
Smith is both reported as coming from "a Fifeshire junior club" and Raith Rovers as being his previous club to Doncaster.

=== Doncaster Rovers ===
He moved to Doncaster Rovers in September 1929, scoring on his debut at Chesterfield in a 2–1 defeat on 28 September.

In December 1935, Smith was in the Doncaster team that played their first game against a club from outside the British Isles when they entertained F.C. Austria of Vienna, a game they eventually lost 1–2. He was also in the first Rovers side to venture abroad when they played a friendly against the Dutch International XI on 21 October 1936 at the Sparta Rotterdam Arena, losing 7–2.

At the end of the 1936–37 season as Rovers dropped back to Division 3 (North), manager Fred Emery decided to have a clear out including giving Smith a free transfer. Over his eight seasons at the club he made a total of 275 league and cup appearances, scoring 39 times.

== Honours ==
Doncaster Rovers

- Third Division North

Champions 1934–35
