= Fred Gregory (footballer, born 1911) =

English footballer (1911–1985)

Personal information
- Full name: Charles Frederick Gregory
- Date of birth: 24 October 1911
- Place of birth: Doncaster, England
- Date of death: 1985 (aged 73–74)
- Position: Full-back

Senior career*
Years	Team	Apps	(Gls)
1928–1929	Brodsworth Main Colliery		
1929–1930	Doncaster Rovers	13	(3)
1931–1934	Manchester City	21	(2)
1934–1937	Reading	129	(6)
1937–1946	Crystal Palace	43	(9)
1946	Hartlepools United	21	(0)
1947	Rotherham United	1	(0)
Total		228	(20)
- * Club domestic league appearances and goals

Charles Frederick Gregory (24 October 1911 – 1985) was an English footballer who played in the Football League for Crystal Palace, Doncaster Rovers, Hartlepools United, Manchester City, Reading and Rotherham United.
