= Horace Fielding =

English footballer

Personal information
- Date of birth: 14 October 1906
- Place of birth: Heywood, England
- Date of death: 14 June 1969 (aged 62)
- Height: 5 ft 10 in (1.78 m)
- Position: Winger

Senior career*
Years	Team	Apps	(Gls)
1925–1926	Mossley		
1926–1930	Stockport County	92	(16)
1930–1933	Grimsby Town	69	(13)
1933–1937	Reading	132	(36)
1937–1938	Crystal Palace	22	(1)
1938	Mansfield Town	0	(0)
1945–1946	Peterborough United	20	(3)
- * Club domestic league appearances and goals

Horace Fielding (14 October 1906 – 14 June 1969) was an English professional footballer who played as a winger.
