= Charlie Howlett (footballer, born 1906) =

English footballer

Charles Edward Howlett (26 September 1906 – 1990) was an English footballer who played as a centre forward for Durham City, Rochdale and Halifax Town.
