= Austin Trippier =

English footballer (1909–1993)

Austin Wilkinson Tripper (30 August 1909 – 1993) was an English footballer who played as a winger for Rochdale, Oldham Athletic and Southport He also played non-league football for various other clubs.
