= George Guyan =

Scottish footballer

Personal information
- Full name: George Wood Guyan
- Date of birth: 3 April 1901
- Place of birth: Aberdeen, Scotland
- Date of death: 1984 (aged 82–83)
- Position: Centre forward

Senior career*
Years	Team	Apps	(Gls)
1921–1922	Banks O' Dee		
1922–1923	Dundee		
1923–1926	South Shields	42	(11)
1926–1928	Hull City	19	(9)
1928–1929	Connah's Quay & Shotton		
1929–1930	Exeter City	28	(14)
1930–1931	Swindon Town	2	(0)
1931	Rochdale	4	(1)
1932	Bath City		
1933	Distillery		
1934	Drumcondra		
1935	Reyrolles		
1936	Middle Dock		
1937	Moorgate United		
Total		95	(35)
- * Club domestic league appearances and goals

George Wood Guyan (3 April 1901 – 1984) was a Scottish footballer who played in the Football League for Exeter City, Hull City, South Shields and Swindon Town.
