= Tommy Bell (footballer, born 1906) =

English footballer

Personal information
- Full name: Thomas Bell
- Date of birth: 9 November 1906
- Place of birth: Seaham Harbour, England
- Date of death: 1983 (aged 76–77)
- Height: 5 ft 9 in (1.75 m)
- Positions: Forward; right half

Senior career*
Years	Team	Apps	(Gls)
- Dawdon Colliery
1924–1925	Bristol City	0	(0)
1925-1926	Torquay United		
1926–1927	Merthyr Town	10	(1)
1927–1930	Halifax Town	89	(26)
1930–1931	Chesterfield	55	(22)
1931–1933	Southport	47	(6)
1933–1934	Luton Town	34	(15)
1934–1938	Northampton Town	73	(31)
- Wellingborough Town
- Spalding United
- * Club domestic league appearances and goals

Thomas Bell (9 November 1906 – 1983) was an English professional footballer born in Seaham Harbour. He could play at inside right, centre forward and right half and was a regular goalscorer throughout his professional career.

Bell played for Dawdon Colliery before joining Bristol City. Unable to break into the City first team, Bell joined Torquay United late in 1925. He joined Merthyr Town in 1926. He subsequently played for Halifax Town, Chesterfield, Southport, Luton Town and Northampton Town before playing non-league football for Wellingborough Town and Spalding United.
