= Dougie Oliver =

English footballer (1906–1992)

Elsdon Douglas Oliver (9 September 1906 – 1992) was an English footballer who played as a full back for Rochdale. He also played non-league football for various other clubs.
