= George Grierson (footballer) =

Scottish footballer

George Grierson (10 May 1905 – 1962) was a Scottish footballer who played league football as a wing half for Preston North End and Rochdale.
