= Archie Longmuir =

Scottish footballer

Personal information
- Full name: Archibald McDonald Longmuir
- Date of birth: 17 April 1897
- Place of birth: Ardrossan, Scotland
- Position: Winger

Senior career*
Years	Team	Apps	(Gls)
- Ardrossan Winton Rovers
1920–1921	Celtic	10	(6)
1921–1923	Blackburn Rovers	28	(2)
1923–1924	Oldham Athletic	22	(4)
1924–1930	Wrexham	223	(34)
1925	→ Cowdenbeath (loan)		
- * Club domestic league appearances and goals

Archibald McDonald Longmuir (born 17 April 1897) was a Scottish professional football who played as a winger. He made professional appearances for Celtic, Blackburn Rovers, Oldham Athletic and Wrexham. At Wrexham, he made over 200 league appearances for the club.
