= Farewell Watts =

English footballer

Personal information
- Date of birth: 10 March 1904
- Place of birth: Sheffield, England
- Date of death: 1970 (aged 65–66)
- Place of death: Sheffield, England
- Position: Inside right

Senior career*
Years	Team	Apps	(Gls)
–1929	Newport County		
1929–1934	Tranmere Rovers	115	(53)
- * Club domestic league appearances and goals

Farewell Watts (10 March 1904 – 1970) was an English footballer who played as an inside right for Newport County and Tranmere Rovers. He made 128 appearances for Tranmere, scoring 60 goals.
