= Jimmy Armstrong (footballer, born 1899) =

English footballer

Personal information
- Full name: James Donald Armstrong
- Date of birth: 12 June 1899
- Place of birth: Chester-le-Street, England
- Height: 5 ft 8 in (1.73 m)
- Position: Defender

Senior career*
Years	Team	Apps	(Gls)
- Chester-le-Street
1921–1924	Barnsley	59	(0)
1925–1926	Bournemouth & Boscombe Athletic	15	(0)
1927–1933	Accrington Stanley	260	(7)
- Stalybridge Celtic
Total		334	(7)
- * Club domestic league appearances and goals

James Donald Armstrong (12 June 1899 – after 1932) was an English professional footballer who played in the Football League for Barnsley, Bournemouth & Boscombe Athletic and Accrington Stanley. He also played for Chester-le-Street and Stalybridge Celtic.

He is Accrington Stanley's Football League appearance record holder.
