= Phil Cartwright =

English footballer

Personal information
- Full name: Herbert Philip Cartwright
- Date of birth: 8 February 1908
- Place of birth: Scarborough, Yorkshire, England
- Date of death: October 1974 (aged 66)
- Position: Outside forward

Senior career*
Years	Team	Apps	(Gls)
–	Scarborough		
1926–1927	Middlesbrough	0	(0)
1927–1929	Bradford Park Avenue	20	(3)
1929–1930	Hull City	20	(0)
1930–1933	Lincoln City	86	(21)
1933–193?	Bournemouth & Boscombe Athletic	0	(0)
–	Scarborough		
1934–193?	Carlisle United	3	(0)
1935–19??	Rotherham United	0	(0)
- * Club domestic league appearances and goals

Herbert Philip Cartwright (8 February 1908 – October 1974) was an English footballer who scored 24 goals in 129 appearances in the Football League playing for Bradford Park Avenue, Hull City, Lincoln City and Carlisle United. He played as an outside forward. He was on the books of Bradford Park Avenue, Bournemouth & Boscombe Athletic and Rotherham United without appearing in the league, and also played non-league football for Scarborough.
