= Dick Brown (footballer) =

English footballer (1911–1985)

Albert Richard Brown (14 February 1911 – 1985) was an English footballer who played as a winger for Rochdale, Sheffield Wednesday (reserve team), Queens Park Rangers, Northampton Town and Nottingham Forest. He also played non-league football for Alnwick United and Blythe Spartans. He was 5 ft 9 in (1.75 m) tall.
