= Andy Mitchell (footballer, born 1907) =

English footballer

Personal information
- Full name: Andrew Mitchell
- Date of birth: 20 April 1907
- Place of birth: Coxhoe, County Durham, England
- Date of death: 3 December 1971 (aged 64)
- Place of death: Blackburn, Lancashire, England
- Height: 5 ft 8 in (1.73 m)
- Position: Outside forward

Youth career
- Ferryhill Athletic
- Crook Town

Senior career*
| Years | Team | Apps | (Gls) |
| 1927–1928 | Sunderland | 0 | (0) |
| 1928–1929 | Notts County | 0 | (0) |
| 1929–1932 | Darlington | 99 | (32) |
| 1932–1933 | Manchester United | 1 | (0) |
| 1933 | Hull City | 8 | (0) |
| 1933–1934 | Northampton Town | 18 | (3) |
| 1934–1936 | Rossendale United | 63 | (16) |
- Great Harwood
| 1936–37 | Rossendale United | 7 | (2) |
- * Club domestic league appearances and goals

Andrew Mitchell (born 20 April 1907 – 3 December 1971) was an English footballer who played as an outside forward. Born in Coxhoe, County Durham, he played for Ferryhill Athletic, Crook Town, Sunderland, Notts County, Darlington, Manchester United, Hull City, Northampton Town, Rossendale United and Great Harwood.

== Career ==
Born in Coxhoe, Mitchell began his football career with nearby Northern League club Ferryhill Athletic before joining their rivals, Crook Town. Crook won the Northern League in 1926–27, but came under investigation by the Durham County Football Association for illegal payments to amateur players. In the wake of the investigation, Mitchell left the club for Football League First Division side Sunderland in December 1927. He did not make a first-team appearance for Sunderland, however, and spent the season playing for the club's reserve team. In August 1928, he dropped down a division to join Notts County, but he was again unable to break into the first team with the East Midlands club, and after another season of reserve team football, he returned to the North-East with Third Division North side Darlington in June 1929.

In his first season with Darlington, Mitchell became a regular in the team's forward line, but despite the team scoring 108 goals during the season (the most in the Football League), Mitchell only found the net seven times in 31 appearances. Although they were the league's top scorers, Darlington finished 13 points behind second-placed Stockport County in third, and missed out on promotion to the Second Division. The following season was more productive for Mitchell as he almost doubled his goals tally to 13 in 37 appearances, but the team as a whole was unable to do the same and they finished 11th out of 22 teams. The same was true in 1931–32, with Mitchell scoring 12 goals in 31 appearances while Darlington languished in mid-table.

In April 1932, Mitchell joined Second Division side Manchester United for £600, but only made one appearance – at outside right against his former club, Notts County, on 18 March 1933 – before being placed on the transfer list. In June 1933, he moved to Hull City, newly promoted to the Second Division as Third Division North champions, but made just eight appearances before leaving in December 1933 to see out the 1933–34 season Northampton Town in the Third Division South. In July 1934, he moved on to Lancashire Combination club Rossendale United, with whom he finished his career, barring a short spell with fellow Lancashire Combination side Great Harwood.
