= Adam Plunkett =

Scottish footballer (1903–1992)

Personal information
- Full name: Adam Gordon T. B. Plunkett
- Date of birth: 16 March 1903
- Place of birth: Blantyre, Scotland
- Date of death: 1992 (aged 88–89)
- Position: Left back

Senior career*
Years	Team	Apps	(Gls)
–1924	Blantyre Celtic		
1924–1925	Bury	0	(0)
1925–1926	Queens Park Rangers	15	(0)
- Guildford United
1927–1928	Walsall	25	(0)
1928–1929	Coventry City	23	(0)
1929	Crystal Palace	0	(0)
1929	Southend United	0	(0)
- Oswestry Town
- Hinckley Athletic
- Loughborough Corinthians
1930–1931	Rochdale	18	(0)
- Stalybridge Celtic
- Hinckley Athletic
- * Club domestic league appearances and goals

Adam Gordon T. B. Plunkett (16 March 1903 – 1992) was a Scottish professional footballer who played in the Football League for Walsall, Coventry City, Rochdale and Queens Park Rangers as a left back.

== Career statistics ==
Appearances and goals by club, season and competition
Club	Season	League			National Cup		Total	
Club	Season	Division	Apps	Goals	Apps	Goals	Apps	Goals
Queens Park Rangers	1925–26	Third Division South	15	0	0	0	15	0
Coventry City	1928–29	Third Division South	23	0	1	0	24	0
Rochdale	1930–31	Third Division North	6	0	0	0	6	0
Rochdale	1931–32	Third Division North	12	0	0	0	12	0
Rochdale	Total		18	0	0	0	18	0
Career total			56	0	1	0	57	0
