= Jack Everest =

Irish footballer

Personal information
- Full name: John Everest
- Date of birth: 20 July 1908
- Place of birth: Kilcullen, Ireland
- Height: 5 ft 10 1/2 in (1.79 m)
- Positions: Defender; forward

Senior career*
Years	Team	Apps	(Gls)
1926–1928	York City	9	(4)
1928–1930	Stockport County	7	(7)
1930–1931	Rochdale		
1931–1934	Blackpool		
1934–1936	Cardiff City	73	(5)
1936–1937	Southend United	49	(2)
1937–1939	Barnsley		
- * Club domestic league appearances and goals

John Everest (born 20 July 1908) was an Irish professional footballer. During his career, he made over 100 appearances in the Football League.

== Career ==
After beginning his career with non-league sides Dunnington and Heslington, Everest turned professional with York City in 1926 before joining Stockport County in 1928, scoring seven goals in seven matches for the Hatters including four during a 7–1 victory over Carlisle United on 18 January 1930. Originally playing as a forward, he converted to playing as a defender in 1931 while playing for Blackpool. Everest joined Cardiff City in 1934 following a recommendation from George Blackburn, who had seen Everest play against his Cheltenham Town side in the FA Cup. He was ever present in his debut season at Ninian Park, playing in each of the club's 47 matches in all competitions and remained first choice the following season, but with the club finishing in 19th and 20th position in his two seasons, Everest was one of a number of players released by manager Ben Watts-Jones in an attempt to improve the club's standings. He later played for Southend United and Barnsley.
