= Idris Williams (Welsh footballer) =

Welsh footballer

Idris Williams was a Welsh footballer who played as a wing half for Rochdale between 1930 and 1932.
