= Tom Watson (footballer, born 1904) =

English footballer

Thomas Andrew Watson (21 February 1904 – 1979) was an English footballer who played as a full back for Rochdale. He was also on the reserve teams of Middlesbrough and Accrington Stanley and played non-league football for various other clubs.
