= Jack Milsom =

English footballer

Personal information
- Date of birth: 2 May 1909
- Place of birth: Speedwell, England
- Date of death: 1976 (aged 66–67)
- Place of death: St George, Bristol
- Position: Forward

Senior career*
Years	Team	Apps	(Gls)
- Hopewell Hill Mission
1926	Exeter City	0	(0)
1926	Bristol Rovers	0	(0)
1927	Kettering Town		
1928–1929	Rochdale	54	(38)
1929–1937	Bolton Wanderers	235	(142)
1937–1939	Manchester City	33	(22)
Total		322	(202)
- * Club domestic league appearances and goals

Jack Milsom (2 May 1909 – 1976) was an English footballer who played in The Football League for Bolton Wanderers, Manchester City and Rochdale. He was born in Speedwell, Bristol, England.
