= Harry Lewis (footballer, born 1910) =

Welsh footballer

Harold Howell Lewis (25 October 1910 – 2006) was a Welsh footballer who played as an inside forward for Rochdale, Southend United, Notts County, West Ham United, Swansea Town and Queen of the South. He was also on the reserve team of Arsenal. He was 5 ft 8 in (1.73 m) tall.
