= George Ward (footballer, born 1908) =

English footballer (1908–1981)

George Henry Ward (15 August 1908 – 1981) was an English footballer who played as a wing half in the football league for Rochdale, as well as non-league football for various other clubs.
