= George Stott (footballer) =

English footballer

Personal information
- Date of birth: 1906
- Place of birth: North Shields, England
- Position: Outside right

Senior career*
Years	Team	Apps	(Gls)
- Percy Main Colliery
- Chilton Colliery Recreation Athletic
- Barnsley
- Monckton Athletic
- Bedlington United
- Rochdale
1931–1932	Bradford City	5	(0)
1932	Hull City	4	(0)
- Macclesfield
- Frickley Colliery
Total		9+	(0+)
- * Club domestic league appearances and goals

George Stott (born 1906) was an English professional footballer who played as an outside right.

== Career ==
Born in North Shields, Stott spent his early career with Percy Main Colliery, Chilton Colliery Recreation Athletic, Barnsley, Monckton Athletic, Bedlington United and Rochdale. He signed for Bradford City from Rochdale in July 1931, making 5 league appearances for the club, before moving to Hull City in May 1932. At Hull he made a further 4 league appearances in 1932 before being released. He later played for Macclesfield and Frickley Colliery.

== Sources ==
- Frost, Terry (1988). Bradford City A Complete Record 1903–1988. Breedon Books Sport. ISBN 0-907969-38-0.
