= Jimmy Cowen =

English footballer

Personal information
- Full name: James Ernest Cowen
- Date of birth: 22 January 1902
- Place of birth: Distington, England
- Date of death: 5 July 1950 (aged 48)
- Place of death: Peterborough, England
- Position: Centre forward

Senior career*
Years	Team	Apps	(Gls)
19xx–1925	Whitehaven Athletic		
1925–1926	Nelson	3	(4)
1926–1927	Barnoldswick Town	30	(9)
1927–1929	Northampton Town	1	(0)
1929–1933	Southport	129	(55)
1933–1934	Aldershot	3	(1)
1934–1935	Peterborough United	33	(12)
Total		181	(70)
- * Club domestic league appearances and goals

James Ernest Cowen (22 January 1902 – 5 July 1950) was an English professional footballer who played as a centre forward. He played over 100 matches in the Football League for Southport.

== Early life and career at Whitehaven ==
Jimmy Cowen was born in Distington, near Cumbria. He was in the Workington Under-18s and attracted Whitehaven Athletic, who eventually brought him to the club where he trained for 2 years before leaving. Not much is known about his Whitehaven career. He left to join Nelson.

== Career in East Lancashire ==
Cowen made his debut in the 4–1 loss to Plymouth, scoring a consolation goal for Nelson. He scored a brace in the 2–1 win against Northampton Town but fractured his ankle. He couldn't help Nelson escape the drop. After his ankle was fully healed, he started the game against Aldershot and scored in the 2–2 draw. After that, he slowly slipped into the reserve team and was sold to Barnoldswick Town.

He made his debut for Barnoldswick in a game against Workington, scoring two in a 5-0 drubbing. He became a first team regular and reached a point where people knew he would become a prolific player. He scored a hattrick against Carlisle City. Barnoldswick won 4–2. He scored another hattrick against Aldershot in a 2–3 win. Northampton Town showed an interest in him and the transfer was finally accepted. His last game was against Nelson his old club, where he got the winning and only goal.

== Northampton Town and move to Southport ==
Northampton needed to get something out of Cowen but he was injured in a 1–0 loss to Charlton Athletic suffering a broken leg. He couldn't make his full debut and could only play on the last day where Northampton needed a win against Preston Athletic. Cowen got the assist for the winning goal for Northampton in a 1–0 win. Meanwhile, Southport scouts had sought an interest in Cowen when he was at Barnoldswick. He was moved for free to Southport, where he reached the pinnacle of his career.
