= 1924–25 Rochdale A.F.C. season =

English football club season

Rochdale
1924–25 season
- Chairman: George L. Foulds
- Manager: Jack Peart
- Stadium: Spotland
- Football League Third Division North: 6th
- FA Cup: 6th round qualifying
- Top goalscorer: League: Harry Anstiss (23); All: Harry Anstiss (23)
- Highest home attendance: 11,000
- Lowest home attendance: 1,000

The 1924–25 season was Rochdale A.F.C.'s 18th in existence and their 4th in the Football League Third Division North.

== Squad Statistics ==
=== Appearances and goals ===
No.	Pos	Nat	Player	Total		Division3 (N)		F.A. Cup	
No.	Pos	Nat	Player	Apps	Goals	Apps	Goals	Apps	Goals
	GK	(England) ENG	Harry Moody	43	0	41	0	2	0
	DF	(Wales) WAL	Dai Hopkins	5	0	5	0	0	0
	DF	(Scotland) SCO	Willie Brown	41	0	39	0	2	0
	MF	(England) ENG	Bobby Willis	22	0	21	0	1	0
	DF	(England) ENG	David Parkes	43	1	41	1	2	0
	MF	(England) ENG	Levy Thorpe	32	0	30	0	2	0
	FW	(England) ENG	Billy Tompkinson	38	11	36	11	2	0
	FW	(England) ENG	Harry Anstiss	44	23	42	23	2	0
	FW	(England) ENG	Albert Whitehurst	22	9	22	9	0	0
	FW	(Scotland) SCO	Teddy Roseboom	32	4	30	4	2	0
	FW	(England) ENG	Albert Pearson	13	3	11	3	2	0
	DF	(Scotland) SCO	Ed Stirling	13	0	13	0	0	0
	FW	(England) ENG	Billy Oxley	11	5	11	5	0	0
	FW	(England) ENG	Bobby Hughes	34	11	33	11	1	0
	DF	(Scotland) SCO	Alex Christie	31	2	29	1	2	1
	FW	(Scotland) SCO	Jock Mills	17	3	16	3	1	0
	DF	(England) ENG	Fred Mason	26	0	25	0	1	0
	MF	(England) ENG	Albert Smith	1	0	1	0	0	0
	MF	(England) ENG	Tweedale Rigg	2	0	2	0	0	0
	MF	(England) ENG	Arthur McGarry	3	0	3	0	0	0
	MF	(England) ENG	Joe Campbell	5	3	5	3	0	0
	MF	(England) ENG	Jack Hall	3	0	3	0	0	0
	FW	(England) ENG	Bob Sandiford	1	1	1	1	0	0
	GK	(England) ENG	Jack Cawthra	1	0	1	0	0	0
	MF	(England) ENG	Cecil Halkyard	1	0	1	0	0	0

Squad Statistics (Non-competitive)

=== Appearances and goals (non-competitive) ===
No.	Pos	Nat	Player	Total		Lancashire Cup		Manchester Cup	
No.	Pos	Nat	Player	Apps	Goals	Apps	Goals	Apps	Goals
	GK	(England) ENG	Harry Moody	1	0	1	0	0	0
	DF	(Wales) WAL	Dai Hopkins	2	0	1	0	1	0
	DF	(Scotland) SCO	Willie Brown	2	0	0	0	2	0
	MF	(England) ENG	Bobby Willis	3	0	1	0	2	0
	DF	(England) ENG	David Parkes	1	0	1	0	0	0
	MF	(England) ENG	Levy Thorpe	1	0	1	0	0	0
	FW	(England) ENG	Billy Tompkinson	1	1	1	1	0	0
	FW	(England) ENG	Harry Anstiss	2	4	1	1	1	3
	FW	(England) ENG	Albert Whitehurst	2	1	0	0	2	1
	FW	(Scotland) SCO	Teddy Roseboom	1	0	1	0	0	0
	FW	(England) ENG	Albert Pearson	2	3	0	0	2	3
	DF	(Scotland) SCO	Ed Stirling	2	0	1	0	1	0
	FW	(England) ENG	Billy Oxley	2	4	1	1	1	3
	FW	(England) ENG	Bobby Hughes	1	0	1	0	0	0
	DF	(Scotland) SCO	Alex Christie	1	0	0	0	1	0
	FW	(Scotland) SCO	Jock Mills	1	1	0	0	1	1
	DF	(England) ENG	Fred Mason	0	0	0	0	0	0
	MF	(England) ENG	Albert Smith	1	0	0	0	1	0
	MF	(England) ENG	Tweedale Rigg	0	0	0	0	0	0
	MF	(England) ENG	Arthur McGarry	2	0	0	0	2	0
	MF	(England) ENG	Joe Campbell	1	0	0	0	1	0
	MF	(England) ENG	Jack Hall	1	0	0	0	1	0
	FW	(England) ENG	Bob Sandiford	0	0	0	0	0	0
	GK	(England) ENG	Jack Cawthra	2	0	0	0	2	0
	MF	(England) ENG	Cecil Halkyard	1	0	0	0	1	0

== Final league table ==
Pos	Team	Pld	W	D	L	GF	GA	GAv	Pts
4	Southport	42	22	7	13	59	37	1.595	51
5	Bradford (Park Avenue)	42	19	12	11	84	42	2.000	50
6	Rochdale	42	21	7	14	75	53	1.415	49
7	Chesterfield	42	17	11	14	60	44	1.364	45
8	Lincoln City	42	18	8	16	53	58	0.914	44

Source: rsssf.com

== Competitions ==
=== Football League Third Division North ===
30 August 1924 1	Hartlepools United	1–1	Rochdale	Hartlepool
	Smith	Report	Tompkinson	Stadium: Victoria Park; Attendance: 6,000

6 September 1924 2	Rochdale	3–2	Wigan Borough	Rochdale
	Anstiss; Roseboom	Report	Kettle; Glover	Stadium: Spotland Stadium; Attendance: 11,000

13 September 1924 3	Rochdale	2–1	Darlington	Rochdale
	Anstiss	Report	Brown	Stadium: Spotland Stadium; Attendance: 6,000

17 September 1924 4	New Brighton	5–0	Rochdale	New Brighton
	Wilcox; Kelly; Mathieson	Report		Stadium: Sandheys Park; Attendance: 6,000

20 September 1924 5	Bradford (Park Avenue)	0–0	Rochdale	Bradford
		Report		Stadium: Park Avenue; Attendance: 12,000

27 September 1924 6	Rochdale	3–1	Wrexham	Rochdale
	Tompkinson; Oxley	Report	Toms	Stadium: Spotland Stadium; Attendance: 10,000

4 October 1924 7	Rotherham County	1–3	Rochdale	Rotherham
	Hammerton	Report	Hughes; Anstiss	Stadium: Millmoor; Attendance: 7,000

11 October 1924 8	Rochdale	2–1	Chesterfield	Rochdale
	Whitehurst; Roseboom	Report	Crockford	Stadium: Spotland Stadium; Attendance: 6,000

18 October 1924 9	Accrington Stanley	2–2	Rochdale	Accrington
	Skillen	Report	Hughes; Christie	Stadium: Peel Park; Attendance: 7,500

25 October 1924 10	Walsall	0–2	Rochdale	Walsall
		Report	Anstiss	Stadium: Fellows Park; Attendance: 7,000

1 November 1924 11	Rochdale	2–1	Tranmere Rovers	Rochdale
	Hughes; Roseboom	Report	Dean	Stadium: Spotland Stadium; Attendance: 6,000

8 November 1924 12	Lincoln City	1–2	Rochdale	Lincoln
	Heathcote 51'	Report	Tompkinson 14', 38'	Stadium: Sincil Bank; Attendance: 8,000

15 November 1924 13	Grimsby Town	1–1	Rochdale	Cleethorpes
	Cooper	Report	Anstiss	Stadium: Blundell Park; Attendance: 8,000

22 November 1924 14	Nelson	1–0	Rochdale	Nelson
	Bottrill	Report		Stadium: Seedhill Football Ground; Attendance: 5,000

6 December 1924 15	Southport	0–0	Rochdale	Southport
		Report		Stadium: Haig Avenue; Attendance: 7,000

20 December 1924 16	Durham City	3–2	Rochdale	Durham
	Foster; Merritt; Stokoe	Report	Hughes; Roseboom	Stadium: Holiday Park; Attendance: 2,000

25 December 1924 17	Rochdale	5–0	Crewe Alexandra	Rochdale
	Hughes; Mills; Tompkinson; Anstiss	Report		Stadium: Spotland Stadium; Attendance: 10,000

26 December 1924 18	Crewe Alexandra	2–0	Rochdale	Crewe
	Oldacre; Toms	Report		Stadium: Gresty Road; Attendance: 6,000

27 December 1924 19	Rochdale	3–1	Hartlepools United	Rochdale
	Mills; Anstiss	Report	Cook	Stadium: Spotland Stadium; Attendance: 5,000

2 January 1925 20	Ashington	4–3	Rochdale	Ashington
	Robertson; Johnson; Gardner; Thompson	Report	Parkes; Anstiss; Mills	Stadium: Portland Park; Attendance: 4,000

3 January 1925 21	Wigan Borough	2–3	Rochdale	Wigan
	Glover	Report	Tompkinson; Hughes; Anstiss	Stadium: Springfield Park; Attendance: 6,000

10 January 1925 22	Rochdale	3–0	Durham City	Rochdale
	Whitehurst; Anstiss	Report		Stadium: Spotland Stadium; Attendance: 8,000

17 January 1925 23	Darlington	2–0	Rochdale	Darlington
	Hooper; Brown	Report		Stadium: Feethams; Attendance: 8,000

24 January 1925 24	Rochdale	2–2	Bradford (Park Avenue)	Rochdale
	Whitehurst	Report	Peel; Quantrill	Stadium: Spotland Stadium; Attendance: 8,000

31 January 1925 25	Wrexham	1–0	Rochdale	Wrexham
	Jones	Report		Stadium: Racecourse Ground; Attendance: 3,000

7 February 1925 26	Rochdale	4–1	Rotherham County	Rochdale
	Pearson; Oxley; Tompkinson	Report	Scott	Stadium: Spotland Stadium; Attendance: 5,000

14 February 1925 27	Chesterfield	2–0	Rochdale	Chesterfield
	Dennis (pen.); Fisher	Report		Stadium: Saltergate Recreation Ground; Attendance: 6,000; Referee: JG Sheppersdon

21 February 1925 28	Rochdale	0–1	Accrington Stanley	Rochdale
		Report	Thompson	Stadium: Spotland Stadium; Attendance: 6,000; Referee: WF Bunnell

24 February 1925 29	Rochdale	5–2	Doncaster Rovers	Rochdale
	Anstiss; Oxley; Campbell	Report	Gascoigne; Keetley	Stadium: Spotland Stadium; Attendance: 1,000

28 February 1925 30	Rochdale	3–0	Walsall	Rochdale
	Hughes; Anstiss; Campbell	Report		Stadium: Spotland Stadium; Attendance: 3,000

7 March 1925 31	Tranmere Rovers	3–1	Rochdale	Birkenhead
	Dean	Report	Oxley	Stadium: Prenton Park; Attendance: 6,000

14 March 1925 32	Rochdale	3–0	Lincoln City	Rochdale
	Tompkinson; Hughes; Anstiss	Report		Stadium: Spotland Stadium; Attendance: 3,000

21 March 1925 33	Barrow	1–0	Rochdale	Barrow-in-Furness
	Lowson	Report		Stadium: Holker Street; Attendance: 3,700

28 March 1925 34	Rochdale	0–1	Nelson	Rochdale
		Report	Laycock	Stadium: Spotland Stadium; Attendance: 8,000

4 April 1925 35	Rochdale	0–0	Ashington	Rochdale
		Report		Stadium: Spotland Stadium; Attendance: 4,000

10 April 1925 36	Rochdale	3–1	Halifax Town	Rochdale
	Whitehurst; Anstiss	Report	Howson	Stadium: Spotland Stadium; Attendance: 3,000

11 April 1925 37	Rochdale	1–0	Southport	Rochdale
	Anstiss	Report		Stadium: Spotland Stadium; Attendance: 4,000

13 April 1925 38	Halifax Town	3–1	Rochdale	Halifax
	Howson; Dixon	Report	Sandiford	Stadium: The Shay; Attendance: 6,000

14 April 1925 39	Rochdale	2–0	New Brighton	Rochdale
	Campbell; Hughes	Report		Stadium: Spotland Stadium; Attendance: 3,500

18 April 1925 40	Doncaster Rovers	2–1	Rochdale	Doncaster
	McLean; Keetley	Report	Whitehurst	Stadium: Belle Vue; Attendance: 3,000

28 April 1925 41	Rochdale	5–1	Barrow	Rochdale
	Whitehurst; Anstiss; Pearson	Report	Clayton	Stadium: Spotland Stadium; Attendance: 3,000

1 May 1925 42	Rochdale	2–0	Grimsby Town	Rochdale
	Tompkinson	Report		Stadium: Spotland Stadium; Attendance: 3,000

=== FA Cup ===
29 November 1924 Q5	Halifax Town	0–1	Rochdale	Halifax
			Christie	Stadium: The Shay; Attendance: 12,000

13 December 1924 Q6	Norwich City	1–0	Rochdale	Norwich
	Hannah (pen.)			Stadium: The Nest; Attendance: 10,000

=== Lancashire Cup ===
2 September 1924 1	Southport	5–3	Rochdale	Southport
	Goal		Tompkinson; Anstiss; Oxley	Stadium: Haig Avenue; Attendance: 5,000

=== Manchester Cup ===
3 February 1925 1	Rochdale	10–0	Manchester University	Rochdale
	Anstiss; Pearson; Oxley; Whitehurst			Stadium: Spotland Stadium

7 March 1925 2	Rochdale	1–3	Ashton National	Rochdale
	Mills		Goal	Stadium: Spotland Stadium; Attendance: 1,500
