= 1922–23 Rochdale A.F.C. season =

English football club season

Rochdale
1922–23 season
- Chairman: JG Ramsbottom
- Manager: Tom Wilson
- Stadium: Spotland
- Football League Third Division North: 12th
- FA Cup: 4th round qualifying
- Top goalscorer: League: William Sandham; George Guy (7); All: William Sandham; George Guy (7)
Home colours

The 1922–23 season was Rochdale A.F.C.'s 16th in existence, in which they competed in their second season in the Football League Third Division North.

== Squad Statistics ==
=== Appearances and goals ===
No.	Pos	Nat	Player	Total		Division3 (N)		FA Cup	
No.	Pos	Nat	Player	Apps	Goals	Apps	Goals	Apps	Goals
N/A	GK	(England) ENG	Jimmy Crabtree	25	2	24	2	1	0
N/A	MF	(England) ENG	Bill Bradbury	13	0	12	0	1	0
N/A	DF	(England) ENG	Stan Charlton	39	0	38	0	1	0
N/A	MF	(England) ENG	Jim Tully	9	0	9	0	0	0
N/A	DF	(England) ENG	David Parkes	36	3	35	3	1	0
N/A	MF	(England) ENG	Dicky Jones	33	0	32	0	1	0
N/A	MF	(England) ENG	George Nicholls	17	0	17	0	0	0
N/A	FW	(England) ENG	William Sandham	23	7	22	7	1	0
N/A	FW	(England) ENG	George Guy	15	7	15	7	0	0
N/A	FW	(England) ENG	Arthur Gee	8	2	8	2	0	0
N/A	FW	(England) ENG	George Wall	31	1	30	1	1	0
N/A	MF	(England) ENG	Joe Campbell	22	1	21	1	1	0
N/A	MF	(England) ENG	Jack Hill	19	3	18	3	1	0
N/A	FW	(England) ENG	Vince Foweather	4	1	4	1	0	0
N/A	MF	(England) ENG	John Broster	8	0	8	0	0	0
N/A	DF	(England) ENG	Jimmy Nuttall	27	0	27	0	0	0
N/A	FW	(England) ENG	William Moody	1	0	1	0	0	0
N/A	FW	(England) ENG	Joe Walters	25	6	24	6	1	0
N/A	GK	(England) ENG	Harry Moody	15	0	15	0	0	0
N/A	MF	(England) ENG	George Daniels	10	0	9	0	1	0
N/A	MF	(England) ENG	Arthur Hinchliffe	22	0	22	0	0	0
N/A	FW	(England) ENG	Bill Prouse	11	4	11	4	0	0
N/A	FW	(England) ENG	John Brown	2	0	2	0	0	0
N/A	DF	(England) ENG	Josiah Chapman	5	0	5	0	0	0
N/A	FW	(England) ENG	Jack Peart	9	4	9	4	0	0
N/A	MF	(England) ENG	Charlie Milnes	0	0	0	0	0	0

Squad Statistics (Non-competitive)

=== Appearances and goals (non-competitive) ===
No.	Pos	Nat	Player	Total		Lancashire Cup		Manchester Cup	
No.	Pos	Nat	Player	Apps	Goals	Apps	Goals	Apps	Goals
N/A	GK	(England) ENG	Jimmy Crabtree	4	0	4	0	0	0
N/A	MF	(England) ENG	Bill Bradbury	6	0	4	0	2	0
N/A	DF	(England) ENG	Stan Charlton	6	0	5	0	1	0
N/A	MF	(England) ENG	Jim Tully	3	0	2	0	1	0
N/A	DF	(England) ENG	David Parkes	6	0	4	0	2	0
N/A	MF	(England) ENG	Dicky Jones	7	0	5	0	2	0
N/A	MF	(England) ENG	George Nicholls	4	0	2	0	2	0
N/A	FW	(England) ENG	William Sandham	5	2	3	1	2	1
N/A	FW	(England) ENG	George Guy	4	2	4	2	0	0
N/A	FW	(England) ENG	Arthur Gee	5	2	5	2	0	0
N/A	FW	(England) ENG	George Wall	7	0	5	0	2	0
N/A	MF	(England) ENG	Joe Campbell	3	1	3	1	0	0
N/A	MF	(England) ENG	Jack Hill	3	0	3	0	0	0
N/A	FW	(England) ENG	Vince Foweather	2	0	2	0	0	0
N/A	MF	(England) ENG	John Broster	1	0	1	0	0	0
N/A	DF	(England) ENG	Jimmy Nuttall	2	0	1	0	1	0
N/A	FW	(England) ENG	William Moody	0	0	0	0	0	0
N/A	FW	(England) ENG	Joe Walters	2	1	0	0	2	1
N/A	GK	(England) ENG	Harry Moody	3	0	1	0	2	0
N/A	MF	(England) ENG	George Daniels	0	0	0	0	0	0
N/A	MF	(England) ENG	Arthur Hinchliffe	2	0	0	0	2	0
N/A	FW	(England) ENG	Bill Prouse	0	0	0	0	0	0
N/A	FW	(England) ENG	John Brown	1	0	0	0	1	0
N/A	DF	(England) ENG	Josiah Chapman	0	0	0	0	0	0
N/A	FW	(England) ENG	Jack Peart	0	0	0	0	0	0
N/A	MF	(England) ENG	Charlie Milnes	1	0	1	0	0	0

== Final league table ==
Pos	Team	Pld	W	D	L	GF	GA	GAv	Pts	Promotion or relegation
10	Wrexham	38	14	10	14	38	48	0.792	38	
11	Stalybridge Celtic (R)	38	15	6	17	42	47	0.894	36	Resigned from the league
12	Rochdale	38	13	10	15	42	53	0.792	36	
13	Lincoln City	38	13	10	15	39	55	0.709	36	
14	Grimsby Town	38	14	5	19	55	52	1.058	33	

Source: rsssf.com
(R) Relegated

== Competitions ==
=== Legend ===
Win	Draw	Loss

=== Football League Third Division North ===
==== Results by matchday ====
Matchday	1	2	3	4	5	6	7	8	9	10	11	12	13	14	15	16	17	18	19	20	21	22	23	24	25	26	27	28	29	30	31	32	33	34	35	36	37	38
Ground	A	H	A	H	H	A	H	A	A	H	A	H	A	H	H	A	A	H	A	A	H	H	A	A	H	H	A	H	H	A	H	A	H	A	H	A	H	A
Result	W	D	W	D	W	L	D	D	D	L	W	W	W	D	W	W	L	W	D	L	L	W	L	L	D	L	L	L	L	L	L	D	W	L	W	D	W	L
Position	2	4	2	3	2	4	4	4	4	5	4	3	3	1	2	2	3	2	2	3	5	2	6	6	5	8	8	11	12	12	13	13	13	13	13	13	12	12

Source: https://www.enfa.com
A = Away; H = Home; W = Win; D = Draw; L = Loss

26 August 1922 1	Crewe Alexandra	0–1	Rochdale	Crewe
		Report	Guy	Stadium: Gresty Road; Attendance: 5,000

2 September 1922 2	Rochdale	1–1	Crewe Alexandra	Rochdale
	Guy	Report	Hodges	Stadium: Spotland Stadium; Attendance: 8,000

9 September 1922 3	Lincoln City	0–1	Rochdale	Lincoln
		Report	Gee	Stadium: Sincil Bank; Attendance: 5,000

16 September 1922 4	Rochdale	1–1	Lincoln City	Rochdale
	Sandham	Report	Pringle	Stadium: Spotland Stadium; Attendance: 10,000

23 September 1922 5	Rochdale	5–0	Wrexham	Rochdale
	Guy; Gee	Report		Stadium: Spotland Stadium; Attendance: 5,000

30 September 1922 6	Wrexham	3–1	Rochdale	Wrexham
	Jack R. Jones; Cotton	Report	Wall	Stadium: Racecourse Ground; Attendance: 6,000

7 October 1922 7	Rochdale	2–2	Darlington	Rochdale
	Parkes	Report	Dickson; Hooper	Stadium: Spotland Stadium; Attendance: 8,000

14 October 1922 8	Walsall	0–0	Rochdale	Walsall
		Report		Stadium: Fellows Park; Attendance: 7,000

21 October 1922 9	Grimsby Town	1–1	Rochdale	Cleethorpes
	Carmichael	Report	Sandham	Stadium: Blundell Park; Attendance: 8,000

28 October 1922 10	Rochdale	0–1	Grimsby Town	Rochdale
		Report	Casson	Stadium: Spotland Stadium; Attendance: 9,000

4 November 1922 11	Hartlepools United	0–2	Rochdale	Hartlepool
		Report	Crabtree	Stadium: Victoria Park; Attendance: 4,000

11 November 1922 12	Rochdale	4–0	Hartlepools United	Rochdale
	Walters; Sandham	Report		Stadium: Spotland Stadium; Attendance: 6,000

25 November 1922 13	Nelson	1–2	Rochdale	Nelson
	Braidwood	Report	Hill; Walters	Stadium: Seedhill; Attendance: 6,000

4 December 1922 14	Rochdale	0–0	Tranmere Rovers	Rochdale
		Report		Stadium: Spotland Stadium; Attendance: 3,000

23 December 1922 15	Rochdale	3–2	Southport	Rochdale
	Prouse; Tootle (o.g.)	Report	Glover; Sibbald	Stadium: Spotland Stadium; Attendance: 3,000

25 December 1922 16	Southport	0–1	Rochdale	Southport
		Report	Hill	Stadium: Haig Avenue

26 December 1922 17	Chesterfield	4–0	Rochdale	Chesterfield
	Cooper; Whitfield; Leddy	Report		Stadium: Saltergate; Attendance: 6,000

30 December 1922 18	Rochdale	2–0	Ashington	Rochdale
	Guy; Campbell	Report		Stadium: Spotland Stadium; Attendance: 3,000

2 January 1923 19	Darlington	1–1	Rochdale	Darlington
	Winship	Report	Sandham	Stadium: Feethams; Attendance: 3,000

6 January 1923 20	Ashington	2–0	Rochdale	Ashington
	Relph	Report		Stadium: Portland Park; Attendance: 4,000

13 January 1923 21	Rochdale	0–3	Nelson	Rochdale
		Report	Eddleston	Stadium: Spotland Stadium; Attendance: 6,000

20 January 1923 22	Rochdale	3–1	Barrow	Rochdale
	Walters; Parkes	Report	Kellock	Stadium: Spotland Stadium; Attendance: 4,000

27 January 1923 23	Barrow	4–1	Rochdale	Barrow-in-Furness
	Webb; Kellock; Bill Robertson	Report	Sandham	Stadium: Holker Street; Attendance: 3,000

3 February 1923 24	Accrington Stanley	2–1	Rochdale	Accrington
	Hosker; Metcalf	Report	Sandham	Stadium: Peel Park; Attendance: 6,000

10 February 1923 25	Rochdale	1–1	Accrington Stanley	Rochdale
	Foweather	Report	Hosker	Stadium: Spotland Stadium; Attendance: 4,000

24 February 1923 26	Rochdale	0–2	Walsall	Rochdale
		Report	Groves 31', 33'	Stadium: Spotland Stadium; Attendance: 4,000

3 March 1923 27	Halifax Town	1–0	Rochdale	Halifax
	Dent	Report		Stadium: The Shay; Attendance: 8,000

10 March 1923 28	Rochdale	0–1	Halifax Town	Rochdale
		Report	Dixon	Stadium: Spotland Stadium; Attendance: 6,000

17 March 1923 29	Rochdale	0–3	Bradford (Park Avenue)	Rochdale
		Report	Bradley; Turnbull	Stadium: Spotland Stadium; Attendance: 5,000

24 March 1923 30	Bradford (Park Avenue)	3–0	Rochdale	Bradford
	Turnbull; McLean	Report		Stadium: Park Avenue; Attendance: 8,000

30 March 1923 31	Rochdale	0–2	Chesterfield	Rochdale
		Report	Marshall; Beel	Stadium: Spotland Stadium

2 April 1923 32	Stalybridge Celtic	0–0	Rochdale	Stalybridge
		Report		Stadium: Bower Fold; Referee: J.A. Horsfield

3 April 1923 33	Rochdale	2–0	Stalybridge Celtic	Rochdale
	Hill; Prouse	Report		Stadium: Spotland; Referee: J.A. Horsfield

7 April 1923 34	Tranmere Rovers	2–0	Rochdale	Birkenhead
	Lomax; Sayer	Report		Stadium: Prenton Park; Attendance: 7,000

14 April 1923 35	Rochdale	2–0	Durham City	Rochdale
	Peart	Report		Stadium: Spotland; Attendance: 3,000

21 April 1923 36	Durham City	1–1	Rochdale	Durham
	Musgrove	Report	Peart	Stadium: Kepier Haughs

28 April 1923 37	Rochdale	3–2	Wigan Borough	Rochdale
	Walters; Prouse; Peart	Report	Spencer; Whitfield	Stadium: Spotland; Attendance: 4,000

5 May 1923 38	Wigan Borough	6–0	Rochdale	Wigan
	Williams; Jones; Spencer; Glover; Stevenson; Whitfield	Report		Stadium: Springfield Park; Attendance: 6,000

=== FA Cup ===
18 November 1922 Q4	Rochdale	0–1	Nelson	Rochdale
			Eddleston	Stadium: Spotland; Attendance: 10,000

=== Lancashire Senior Cup ===
30 August 1922 PR	Accrington Stanley	1–2	Rochdale	Accrington
	Goal		Guy; Gee	Stadium: Peel Park; Attendance: 7,000

12 September 1922 PR	Rochdale	1–0	Manchester United	Rochdale
	Sandham			Stadium: Spotland; Attendance: 5,000

2 October 1922 PR	Stockport County	2–2	Rochdale	Stockport
	Goal		Campbell; Gee	Stadium: Edgeley Park; Attendance: 5,000

10 October 1922 PRr	Rochdale	0–0	Stockport County	Rochdale
				Stadium: Spotland; Attendance: 3,000

18 October 1922 PRr2	Stockport County	4–1	Rochdale	Manchester
	Goal		Guy	Stadium: Hyde Road; Attendance: 3,000

=== Manchester Cup ===
13 February 1923	Oldham Athletic	1–1	Rochdale	Oldham
	Goal		Walters	Stadium: Boundary Park; Attendance: 2,000

20 February 1923	Rochdale	1–3	Oldham Athletic	Rochdale
	Sandham		Goal	Stadium: Spotland
