= 1925–26 Rochdale A.F.C. season =

English football club season

Rochdale
1925–26 season
- Chairman: George L. Foulds
- Manager: Jack Peart
- Stadium: Spotland Stadium
- Football League Third Division North: 3rd
- FA Cup: 2nd Round
- Top goalscorer: League: Billy Fergusson (19); All: Billy Fergusson (21)

The 1925–26 season was Rochdale A.F.C.'s 19th in existence and their 5th in the Football League Third Division North.

== Squad Statistics ==
=== Competitive ===
==== Appearances and goals ====
No.	Pos	Nat	Player	Total		League Division 3 (N)		FA Cup	
No.	Pos	Nat	Player	Apps	Goals	Apps	Goals	Apps	Goals
	GK	(England) ENG	Harry Moody	41	0	38	0	3	0
	DF	(Wales) WAL	Dai Hopkins	24	0	21	0	3	0
	DF	(Scotland) SCO	Willie Brown	45	0	42	0	3	0
	MF	(England) ENG	Bobby Willis	4	0	4	0	0	0
	DF	(England) ENG	David Parkes	37	2	34	1	3	1
	DF	(Scotland) SCO	Alex Christie	45	4	42	4	3	0
	FW	(England) ENG	Billy Tompkinson	16	8	16	8	0	0
	FW	(England) ENG	Harry Anstiss	30	16	30	16	0	0
	FW	(England) ENG	Billy Fergusson	24	21	21	19	3	2
	FW	(England) ENG	Billy Smith	10	2	10	2	0	0
	FW	(England) ENG	Bobby Hughes	39	17	36	16	3	1
	DF	(England) ENG	Joe Robson	4	0	4	0	0	0
	FW	(England) ENG	Albert Whitehurst	32	18	29	18	3	0
	FW	(England) ENG	Albert Pearson	7	2	7	2	0	0
	MF	(Scotland) SCO	John Hillhouse	34	0	31	0	3	0
	MF	(England) ENG	Henry Martin	31	5	28	4	3	1
	MF	(England) ENG	Joe Campbell	1	0	1	0	0	0
	FW	(England) ENG	Billy Bertram	34	11	31	11	3	0
	GK	(England) ENG	Jack Cawthra	4	0	4	0	0	0
	MF	(England) ENG	Levy Thorpe	1	0	1	0	0	0
	DF	(England) ENG	Fred Mason	21	0	21	0	0	0
	MF	(England) ENG	Cecil Halkyard	1	0	1	0	0	0
	DF	(England) ENG	Ernie Braidwood	10	0	10	0	0	0
	DF	(Scotland) SCO	Joe Quinn	0	0	0	0	0	0
	DF	(Wales) WAL	George Bishop	0	0	0	0	0	0

=== Non-competitive ===
Squad Statistics (Non-competitive)

==== Appearances and goals ====
No.	Pos	Nat	Player	Total		Lancashire Cup		Manchester Cup	
No.	Pos	Nat	Player	Apps	Goals	Apps	Goals	Apps	Goals
	GK	(England) ENG	Harry Moody	2	0	1	0	1	0
	DF	(Wales) WAL	Dai Hopkins	2	0	1	0	1	0
	DF	(Scotland) SCO	Willie Brown	1	0	1	0	0	0
	MF	(England) ENG	Bobby Willis	0	0	0	0	0	0
	DF	(England) ENG	David Parkes	0	0	0	0	0	0
	DF	(Scotland) SCO	Alex Christie	1	0	1	0	0	0
	FW	(England) ENG	Billy Tompkinson	0	0	0	0	0	0
	FW	(England) ENG	Harry Anstiss	0	0	0	0	0	0
	FW	(England) ENG	Billy Fergusson	2	0	1	0	1	0
	FW	(England) ENG	Billy Smith	1	0	0	0	1	0
	FW	(England) ENG	Bobby Hughes	0	0	0	0	0	0
	DF	(England) ENG	Joe Robson	1	0	1	0	0	0
	FW	(England) ENG	Albert Whitehurst	1	0	0	0	1	0
	FW	(England) ENG	Albert Pearson	0	0	0	0	0	0
	MF	(Scotland) SCO	John Hillhouse	2	0	1	0	1	0
	MF	(England) ENG	Henry Martin	1	0	1	0	0	0
	MF	(England) ENG	Joe Campbell	2	0	1	0	1	0
	FW	(England) ENG	Billy Bertram	1	1	1	1	0	0
	GK	(England) ENG	Jack Cawthra	0	0	0	0	0	0
	MF	(England) ENG	Levy Thorpe	0	0	0	0	0	0
	DF	(England) ENG	Fred Mason	0	0	0	0	0	0
	MF	(England) ENG	Cecil Halkyard	1	0	0	0	1	0
	DF	(England) ENG	Ernie Braidwood	0	0	0	0	0	0
	DF	(Scotland) SCO	Joe Quinn	1	0	0	0	1	0
	DF	(Wales) WAL	George Bishop	1	0	0	0	1	0

== Final league table ==
Pos	Team	Pld	W	D	L	GF	GA	GAv	Pts	Promotion
1	Grimsby Town (C, P)	42	26	9	7	91	40	2.275	61	Promotion to the Second Division
2	Bradford (Park Avenue)	42	26	8	8	101	43	2.349	60	
3	Rochdale	42	27	5	10	104	58	1.793	59	
4	Chesterfield	42	25	5	12	100	54	1.852	55	
5	Halifax Town	42	17	11	14	53	50	1.060	45	

(C) Champions; (P) Promoted

== Competitions ==
=== Football League Third Division North ===
29 August 1925 1	Rochdale	6–0	Hartlepools United	Rochdale
	Tompkinson; Fergusson; Hughes; Anstiss	Report		Stadium: Spotland Stadium; Attendance: 9,321

1 September 1925 2	Halifax Town	1–1	Rochdale	Halifax
	Howson	Report	Hughes (pen.)	Stadium: The Shay; Attendance: 7,362

5 September 1925 3	Wigan Borough	2–2	Rochdale	Wigan
	Dunn; Callagher (red card)	Report	Fergusson	Stadium: Springfield Park; Attendance: 7,590

8 September 1925 4	Rochdale	2–2	Rotherham United	Rochdale
	Tompkinson; Hughes	Report	Lievesley; John T Harrison	Stadium: Spotland Stadium; Attendance: 5,643

12 September 1925 5	Tranmere Rovers	3–5	Rochdale	Birkenhead
	White; Matthews; Marquis	Report	Hughes; Parkes; Anstiss; Whitehurst	Stadium: Prenton Park; Attendance: 9,136

15 September 1925 6	Rochdale	2–1	Halifax Town	Rochdale
	Anstiss	Report	Dixon	Stadium: Spotland Stadium; Attendance: 6,528

19 September 1925 7	Rochdale	2–0	Walsall	Rochdale
	Tompkinson; Hughes	Report		Stadium: Spotland Stadium; Attendance: 3,484

26 September 1925 8	Chesterfield	1–2	Rochdale	Chesterfield
	Whitfield	Report	Pearson; Dennis (o.g.)	Stadium: Saltergate Recreation Ground; Attendance: 5,073

3 October 1925 9	Rochdale	2–0	Bradford Park Avenue	Rochdale
	Pearson; Tompkinson	Report		Stadium: Spotland Stadium; Attendance: 16,295

10 October 1925 10	Grimsby Town	3–0	Rochdale	Cleethorpes
	Carmichael; Cooper	Report		Stadium: Blundell Park; Attendance: 11,602

17 October 1925 11	Rochdale	1–3	Ashington	Rochdale
	Anstiss	Report	Randall; Gardner; Turnbull	Stadium: Spotland Stadium; Attendance: 4,089

24 October 1925 12	Barrow	1–3	Rochdale	Barrow-in-Furness
	Mooney	Report	Tompkinson; Fergusson; Tubb (o.g.)	Stadium: Holker Street; Attendance: 2,534

31 October 1925 13	Rochdale	2–0	Crewe Alexandra	Rochdale
	Fergusson; Smith	Report		Stadium: Spotland Stadium; Attendance: 3,936

2 November 1925 14	Rotherham United	0–4	Rochdale	Rotherham
		Report	Fergusson; Hughes; Bertram	Stadium: Millmoor; Attendance: 5,363

7 November 1925 15	New Brighton	3–0	Rochdale	New Brighton
	Reid; Kelly; Dunne	Report		Stadium: Sandheys Park; Attendance: 2,142

14 November 1925 16	Rochdale	1–2	Wrexham	Rochdale
	Fergusson	Report	Nock	Stadium: Spotland Stadium; Attendance: 6,032

21 November 1925 17	Doncaster Rovers	2–2	Rochdale	Doncaster
	Keetley	Report	Fergusson; Hughes	Stadium: Belle Vue; Attendance: 4,831

5 December 1925 18	Lincoln City	0–2	Rochdale	Lincoln
		Report	Fergusson 17'; Hughes 81'	Stadium: Sincil Bank; Attendance: 5,153

19 December 1925 19	Coventry City	2–2	Rochdale	Coventry
	Herbert; Houldey	Report	Fergusson; Whitehurst	Stadium: Highfield Road; Attendance: 11,110

26 December 1925 20	Rochdale	5–0	Durham City	Rochdale
	Fergusson; Christie; Whitehurst; Bertram	Report		Stadium: Spotland Stadium; Attendance: 5,222

1 January 1926 21	Durham City	0–2	Rochdale	Durham
		Report	Whitehurst; Hughes	Stadium: Holiday Park; Attendance: 2,681

2 January 1926 22	Hartlepools United	4–2	Rochdale	Hartlepool
	Best; Carr; Hardy	Report	Whitehurst; Smith	Stadium: Victoria Park; Attendance: 6,057

16 January 1926 23	Rochdale	2–1	Wigan Borough	Rochdale
	Hughes; Fergusson	Report	Mandy	Stadium: Spotland Stadium; Attendance: 4,365

23 January 1926 24	Rochdale	3–2	Tranmere Rovers	Rochdale
	Fergusson; Bertram; Whitehurst	Report	White; Campbell	Stadium: Spotland Stadium; Attendance: 4,074

25 January 1926 25	Rochdale	3–1	Southport	Rochdale
	Hughes; Fergusson; Bertram	Report	Brown	Stadium: Spotland Stadium; Attendance: 2,624

30 January 1926 26	Walsall	1–5	Rochdale	Walsall
	Crockford	Report	Fergusson; Whitehurst; Hughes; Martin	Stadium: Fellows Park; Attendance: 2,361

6 February 1926 27	Rochdale	2–4	Chesterfield	Rochdale
	Saxby (o.g.); Martin	Report	Whitfield; Cookson	Stadium: Spotland Stadium; Attendance: 8,342

13 February 1926 28	Bradford Park Avenue	3–1	Rochdale	Bradford
	Hubbert; McDonald; Poyntz	Report	Hughes	Stadium: Park Avenue; Attendance: 24,893

20 February 1926 29	Rochdale	5–2	Grimsby Town	Rochdale
	Whitehurst; Anstiss; Bertram; Hughes	Report	Marshall; McKenna	Stadium: Spotland Stadium; Attendance: 7,544

27 February 1926 30	Ashington	0–1	Rochdale	Ashington
		Report	Whitehurst	Stadium: Portland Park; Attendance: 4,270

6 March 1926 31	Rochdale	2–1	Barrow	Rochdale
	Whitehurst; Bertram	Report	Rawlinson	Stadium: Spotland Stadium; Attendance: 5,524

13 March 1926 32	Crewe Alexandra	3–2	Rochdale	Crewe
	Clayson; Holland; Aitken	Report	Whitehurst; Anstiss	Stadium: Gresty Road; Attendance: 6,034

20 March 1926 33	Rochdale	2–1	New Brighton	Rochdale
	Anstiss; Martin (pen.)	Report	Copitch	Stadium: Spotland Stadium; Attendance: 6,794

23 March 1926 34	Rochdale	2–0	Nelson	Rochdale
	Anstiss; Whitehurst	Report		Stadium: Spotland Stadium; Attendance: 2,981

27 March 1926 35	Wrexham	1–0	Rochdale	Wrexham
	Roberts	Report		Stadium: Racecourse Ground; Attendance: 6,855

2 April 1926 36	Accrington Stanley	1–3	Rochdale	Accrington
	Gee (pen.)	Report	Anstiss; Christie; Tompkinson	Stadium: Peel Park; Attendance: 5,264

3 April 1926 37	Rochdale	4–1	Doncaster Rovers	Rochdale
	Christie; Bertram	Report	Keetley	Stadium: Spotland Stadium; Attendance: 6,792

5 April 1926 38	Rochdale	3–2	Accrington Stanley	Rochdale
	Anstiss; Martin	Report	Gee	Stadium: Spotland Stadium; Attendance: 7,890

10 April 1926 39	Southport	1–7	Rochdale	Southport
	Ball	Report	Anstiss; Whitehurst; Bertram	Stadium: Haig Avenue; Attendance: 4,699

17 April 1926 40	Rochdale	0–1	Lincoln City	Rochdale
		Report	Alford 5'	Stadium: Spotland Stadium; Attendance: 6,797

24 April 1926 41	Nelson	1–3	Rochdale	Nelson
	Eddleston	Report	Anstiss; Fergusson; Hughes	Stadium: Seedhill Football Ground; Attendance: 6,215

1 May 1926 42	Rochdale	4–1	Coventry City	Rochdale
	Whitehurst; Christie; Tompkinson	Report	Breslin	Stadium: Spotland Stadium; Attendance: 2,352

=== FA Cup ===
28 November 1925 A	Rochdale	1a1	West Stanley	Rochdale
	Hughes		Goal	Stadium: Spotland Stadium; Attendance: 5000

1 December 1925 1	Rochdale	4–0	West Stanley	Rochdale
	Hughes; Martin (pen.); Fergusson	Report		Stadium: Spotland Stadium; Attendance: 1661

12 December 1925 2	Chilton Colliery Recreation	1–1	Rochdale	Chilton
	Catterick	Report	Fergusson	Attendance: 5000

17 December 1925 2 (Replay)	Rochdale	1–2	Chilton Colliery Recreation	Rochdale
	Parkes	Report	Catterick (red card)	Stadium: Spotland Stadium; Attendance: 1500

=== Lancashire Cup ===
6 October 1925 1	Nelson	3–1	Rochdale	Nelson
	Goal		Bertram	Stadium: Seedhill Football Ground; Attendance: 2,500

=== Manchester Cup ===
16 February 1926 1	Ashton National	1–0	Rochdale	Ashton-under-Lyne
	Goal			Stadium: National Park
