= 1923–24 Rochdale A.F.C. season =

English football club season

Rochdale
1923–24 season
- Chairman: George L. Foulds
- Manager: Tom Wilson; Jack Peart
- Stadium: Spotland
- Football League Third Division North: 2nd
- FA Cup: 5th round qualifying
- Top goalscorer: League: Bill Prouse; Albert Whitehurst (14); All: Albert Whitehurst (15)
Home colours

The 1923–24 season was Rochdale A.F.C.'s 17th in existence and their 3rd in the Football League Third Division North. Prior to the start of the season, the club were expelled from the F.A. because a former player had not been paid, however they were re-instated when it was confirmed that the player was on holiday when the money was sent.

== Squad Statistics ==
=== Appearances and goals ===
No.	Pos	Nat	Player	Total		Division3 (N)		FA Cup	
No.	Pos	Nat	Player	Apps	Goals	Apps	Goals	Apps	Goals
N/A	GK	(England) ENG	Harry Moody	42	0	40	0	2	0
N/A	DF	(Scotland) SCO	Jimmy Bissett	44	3	42	3	2	0
N/A	DF	(Scotland) SCO	Willie Brown	42	0	40	0	2	0
N/A	MF	(England) ENG	Bobby Willis	41	1	39	1	2	0
N/A	MF	(England) ENG	David Parkes	43	1	42	1	1	0
N/A	MF	(England) ENG	Frank Crowe	20	5	18	5	2	0
N/A	FW	(England) ENG	Billy Tompkinson	40	6	38	6	2	0
N/A	FW	(England) ENG	Bill Prouse	41	14	40	14	1	0
N/A	FW	(England) ENG	Albert Whitehurst	37	15	35	14	2	1
N/A	FW	(England) ENG	Albert Pearson	36	7	34	7	2	0
N/A	FW	(England) ENG	Joe Clark	16	1	16	1	0	0
N/A	MF	(England) ENG	Joe Campbell	6	0	6	0	0	0
N/A	FW	(England) ENG	Jack Peart	13	6	12	6	1	0
N/A	MF	(England) ENG	Arthur McGarry	41	1	39	1	2	0
N/A	DF	(England) ENG	Jimmy Nuttall	2	0	2	0	0	0
N/A	MF	(England) ENG	Albert Smith	12	0	12	0	0	0
N/A	DF	(England) ENG	Edward Watson	1	0	1	0	0	0
N/A	MF	(England) ENG	Jack Hall	2	3	1	0	1	3
N/A	FW	(England) ENG	Bob Sandiford	3	1	3	1	0	0
N/A	GK	(England) ENG	Cyril Hibberd	2	0	2	0	0	0

Squad Statistics (Non-competitive)

=== Appearances and goals (non-competitive) ===
No.	Pos	Nat	Player	Total		Lancashire Cup		Manchester Cup	
No.	Pos	Nat	Player	Apps	Goals	Apps	Goals	Apps	Goals
N/A	GK	(England) ENG	Harry Moody	3	0	3	0	0	0
N/A	DF	(Scotland) SCO	Jimmy Bissett	2	0	2	0	0	0
N/A	DF	(Scotland) SCO	Willie Brown	3	0	3	0	0	0
N/A	MF	(England) ENG	Bobby Willis	4	0	3	0	1	0
N/A	MF	(England) ENG	David Parkes	1	0	1	0	0	0
N/A	MF	(England) ENG	Frank Crowe	3	0	2	0	1	0
N/A	FW	(England) ENG	Billy Tompkinson	1	0	1	0	0	0
N/A	FW	(England) ENG	Bill Prouse	3	1	2	1	1	0
N/A	FW	(England) ENG	Albert Whitehurst	4	0	3	0	1	0
N/A	FW	(England) ENG	Albert Pearson	3	0	3	0	0	0
N/A	FW	(England) ENG	Joe Clark	3	0	2	0	1	0
N/A	MF	(England) ENG	Joe Campbell	1	0	1	0	0	0
N/A	FW	(England) ENG	Jack Peart	2	1	2	1	0	0
N/A	MF	(England) ENG	Arthur McGarry	4	0	3	0	1	0
N/A	DF	(England) ENG	Jimmy Nuttall	1	0	0	0	1	0
N/A	MF	(England) ENG	Albert Smith	2	1	1	0	1	1
N/A	DF	(England) ENG	Edward Watson	2	0	1	0	1	0
N/A	MF	(England) ENG	Jack Hall	1	0	0	0	1	0
N/A	FW	(England) ENG	Bob Sandiford	0	0	0	0	0	0
N/A	GK	(England) ENG	Cyril Hibberd	1	0	0	0	1	0

== Final league table ==
Pos	Team	Pld	W	D	L	GF	GA	GAv	Pts	Promotion
1	Wolverhampton Wanderers (C, P)	42	24	15	3	76	27	2.815	63	Promotion to the Second Division
2	Rochdale	42	25	12	5	60	26	2.308	62	
3	Chesterfield	42	22	10	10	70	39	1.795	54	
4	Rotherham County	42	23	6	13	70	43	1.628	52	
5	Bradford (Park Avenue)	42	21	10	11	69	43	1.605	52	

Source: rsssf.com
(C) Champions; (P) Promoted

== Competitions ==
=== Results by matchday ===
Matchday	1	2	3	4	5	6	7	8	9	10	11	12	13	14	15	16	17	18	19	20	21	22	23	24	25	26	27	28	29	30	31	32	33	34	35	36	37	38	39	40	41	42
Ground	H	A	A	H	A	H	A	H	A	H	A	H	A	H	A	A	H	A	A	H	H	A	H	H	H	A	H	A	H	H	A	A	H	A	A	H	A	H	H	A	A	H
Result	W	L	D	W	L	W	D	W	D	W	D	D	D	W	D	W	W	W	W	W	W	W	D	W	W	L	W	W	D	W	D	L	W	D	W	W	W	D	W	W	L	W
Position	2	11	12	5	12	8	10	5	5	3	2	3	7	4	5	5	2	2	2	2	2	2	2	1	1	2	1	1	2	1	2	2	2	2	2	2	1	1	2	2	2	2

Source: https://www.enfa.com
A = Away; H = Home; W = Win; D = Draw; L = Loss

=== Football League Third Division North ===
25 August 1923 1	Rochdale	2–0	Durham City	Rochdale
	Tompkinson; Prouse	Report		Stadium: Spotland; Attendance: 6,000

27 August 1923 2	Wigan Borough	3–0	Rochdale	Wigan
	Armitage; Glover	Report		Stadium: Springfield Park; Attendance: 15,000

1 September 1923 3	Durham City	0–0	Rochdale	Durham
		Report		Stadium: Holiday Park; Attendance: 4,000

3 September 1923 4	Rochdale	1–0	Wigan Borough	Rochdale
	Prouse	Report		Stadium: Spotland; Attendance: 8,000

8 September 1923 5	Bradford (Park Avenue)	4–2	Rochdale	Bradford
	Peel; Turnbull; McLean	Report	Whitehurst	Stadium: Park Avenue; Attendance: 8,000

15 September 1923 6	Rochdale	3–0	Bradford (Park Avenue)	Rochdale
	Crowe; Peart	Report		Stadium: Spotland; Attendance: 7,000

22 September 1923 7	Chesterfield	1–1	Rochdale	Chesterfield
	Fisher	Report	Prouse	Stadium: Saltergate; Attendance: 9,700

29 September 1923 8	Rochdale	3–0	Chesterfield	Rochdale
	Crowe; Whitehurst	Report		Stadium: Spotland; Attendance: 8,000

6 October 1923 9	Rotherham County	0–0	Rochdale	Rotherham
		Report		Stadium: Millmoor; Attendance: 8,000

13 October 1923 10	Rochdale	1–0	Rotherham County	Rochdale
	Whitehurst	Report		Stadium: Spotland; Attendance: 8,000

20 October 1923 11	Wrexham	1–1	Rochdale	Wrexham
	Edwards	Report	Peart	Stadium: Racecourse Ground; Attendance: 4,700

27 October 1923 12	Rochdale	0–0	Wrexham	Rochdale
		Report		Stadium: Spotland; Attendance: 7,000

3 November 1923 13	Doncaster Rovers	0–0	Rochdale	Doncaster
		Report		Stadium: Belle Vue; Attendance: 7,000

10 November 1923 14	Rochdale	2–0	Doncaster Rovers	Rochdale
	Prouse; Bissett (pen.)	Report		Stadium: Spotland; Attendance: 6,500

24 November 1923 15	Darlington	2–2	Rochdale	Darlington
	Stevens; Hooper	Report	Peart; Tompkinson	Stadium: Feethams; Attendance: 5,800

8 December 1923 16	Southport	0–1	Rochdale	Southport
		Report	Pearson	Stadium: Haig Avenue; Attendance: 5,000

15 December 1923 17	Rochdale	3–1	Barrow	Rochdale
	Whitehurst; Pearson	Report	Matthews (pen.)	Stadium: Spotland; Attendance: 5,000

22 December 1923 18	Barrow	1–2	Rochdale	Barrow-in-Furness
	Dickie	Report	Peart; Prouse	Stadium: Holker Street; Attendance: 2,000

25 December 1923 19	Lincoln City	0–2	Rochdale	Lincoln
		Report	Peart; Pearson	Stadium: Sincil Bank; Attendance: 7,000

26 December 1923 20	Rochdale	1–0	Lincoln City	Rochdale
	Whitehurst	Report		Stadium: Spotland; Attendance: 8,000

29 December 1923 21	Rochdale	1–0	Crewe Alexandra	Rochdale
	Willis	Report		Stadium: Spotland; Attendance: 5,000

5 January 1924 22	Crewe Alexandra	0–2	Rochdale	Crewe
		Report	Prouse; Parkes	Stadium: Gresty Road; Attendance: 6,000

8 January 1924 23	Rochdale	2–2	Southport	Rochdale
	Whitehurst (pen.)	Report	Cousins	Stadium: Spotland; Attendance: 2,000

12 January 1924 24	Rochdale	1–0	Hartlepools United	Rochdale
	Prouse	Report		Stadium: Spotland; Attendance: 4,000

19 January 1924 25	Rochdale	1–0	Ashington	Rochdale
	Bissett (pen.)	Report		Stadium: Spotland; Attendance: 6,000

26 January 1924 26	Ashington	1–0	Rochdale	Ashington
	Laverick	Report		Stadium: Portland Park; Attendance: 5,500

2 February 1924 27	Rochdale	1–0	Walsall	Rochdale
	Pearson	Report		Stadium: Spotland; Attendance: 5,000

9 February 1924 28	Walsall	0–1	Rochdale	Walsall
		Report	Tompkinson	Stadium: Fellows Park; Attendance: 5,000

16 February 1924 29	Rochdale	0–0	Wolverhampton Wanderers	Rochdale
		Report		Stadium: Spotland; Attendance: 16161

1 March 1924 30	Rochdale	6–2	New Brighton	Rochdale
	Pearson; Whitehurst; Prouse; Tompkinson	Report	Crooks	Stadium: Spotland; Attendance: 3,000

8 March 1924 31	New Brighton	1–1	Rochdale	New Brighton
	Howard	Report	Peart	Stadium: Sandheys Park; Attendance: 7,000

15 March 1924 32	Grimsby Town	1–0	Rochdale	Cleethorpes
	Carmichael	Report		Stadium: Blundell Park; Attendance: 7,000

22 March 1924 33	Rochdale	4–2	Grimsby Town	Rochdale
	McGarry; Whitehurst; Clark; Sandiford	Report	Carmichael; Dent	Stadium: Spotland; Attendance: 5,000

26 March 1924 34	Wolverhampton Wanderers	0–0	Rochdale	Wolverhampton
		Report		Stadium: Molineux; Attendance: 12,000

29 March 1924 35	Halifax Town	0–1	Rochdale	Halifax
		Report	Prouse	Stadium: The Shay; Attendance: 4,000

5 April 1924 36	Rochdale	3–0	Halifax Town	Rochdale
	Prouse; Whitehurst; Pearson	Report		Stadium: Spotland; Attendance: 6,000

10 April 1924 Abandoned	Tranmere Rovers	2a2	Rochdale	Birkenhead
	Goal		Prouse; Whitehurst	Stadium: Prenton Park; Attendance: 6,000

12 April 1924 37	Hartlepools United	1–2	Rochdale	Hartlepool
	Morris	Report	Prouse; Bissett (pen.)	Stadium: Victoria Park; Attendance: 5,000

18 April 1924 38	Rochdale	0–0	Darlington	Rochdale
		Report		Stadium: Spotland; Attendance: 6,000

22 April 1924 39	Rochdale	1–0	Tranmere Rovers	Rochdale
	Crowe	Report		Stadium: Spotland; Attendance: 5,000

26 April 1924 40	Accrington Stanley	0–1	Rochdale	Accrington
		Report	Pearson	Stadium: Peel Park; Attendance: 6,000

28 April 1924 41	Tranmere Rovers	2–1	Rochdale	Birkenhead
	Brown; Cartman	Report	Prouse	Stadium: Prenton Park; Attendance: 8,000

3 May 1924 42	Rochdale	4–1	Accrington Stanley	Rochdale
	Tompkinson; Prouse	Report	Brown	Stadium: Spotland; Attendance: 5,000

=== FA Cup ===
17 November 1923 Q4	Rochdale	4–0	Skelmersdale United	Rochdale
	Hall; Whitehurst			Stadium: Spotland; Attendance: 2,000

1 December 1923 Q5	Accrington Stanley	1–0	Rochdale	Accrington
	Kay			Stadium: Peel Park; Attendance: 7,000

=== Lancashire Cup ===
12 September 1923 1	Wigan Borough	0–0	Rochdale	Wigan
				Stadium: Springfield Park; Attendance: 6,000

2 October 1923 1 (Replay)	Rochdale	1–0	Wigan Borough	Rochdale
	Peart			Stadium: Spotland

16 October 1923 2	Rochdale	1–5	Oldham Athletic	Rochdale
	Prouse		Goal	Stadium: Spotland

=== Manchester Cup ===
4 March 1924 2	Bury	8–1	Rochdale	Bury
	Goal		Smith	Stadium: Gigg Lane
