= 1919–20 Rochdale A.F.C. season =

English football club season

Rochdale
1919–20 season
- Stadium: Spotland Stadium
- Central League: 19th
- FA Cup: First Round
- Top goalscorer: League: Tom Hesmondhalgh (12); All: Tom Hesmondhalgh (12)

The 1919–20 season was Rochdale A.F.C.'s 13th in existence where they competed in The F.A. Cup for the 8th time and reached the first round proper. The also competed in the Central League.

== Squad Statistics ==
=== Appearances and goals ===
| No. | Pos | Nat | Player | Total | | Central League | | F.A. Cup | |
| No. | Pos | Nat | Player | Apps | Goals | Apps | Goals | Apps | Goals |
|---|---|---|---|---|---|---|---|---|---|
| | GK | | T. Berry | 6 | 0 | 6 | 0 | 0 | 0 |
| | GK | | J. Stott | 10 | 0 | 10 | 0 | 0 | 0 |
| | MF | (England) ENG | Frank Sheldon | 2 | 0 | 2 | 0 | 0 | 0 |
| | GK | | Bould Hurst | 25 | 0 | 21 | 0 | 4 | 0 |
| | GK | | W. Plumley | 3 | 0 | 3 | 0 | 0 | 0 |
| | FW | | George Horridge | 10 | 2 | 7 | 2 | 3 | 0 |
| | DF | | H. Anderson | 2 | 0 | 2 | 0 | 0 | 0 |
| | DF | | P. Pickup | 5 | 0 | 5 | 0 | 0 | 0 |
| | DF | | J. Taylor | 5 | 0 | 5 | 0 | 0 | 0 |
| | DF | (England) ENG | Jimmy Nuttall | 34 | 2 | 30 | 2 | 4 | 0 |
| | MF | (England) ENG | Jim Tully | 34 | 0 | 30 | 0 | 4 | 0 |
| | MF | (England) ENG | Herbert Tierney | 26 | 2 | 22 | 2 | 4 | 0 |
| | DF | | F. Wood | 33 | 0 | 30 | 0 | 3 | 0 |
| | DF | (England) ENG | Tom Bamford | 2 | 0 | 2 | 0 | 0 | 0 |
| | DF | | J. Higgins | 2 | 0 | 2 | 0 | 0 | 0 |
| | DF | | Dixon | 1 | 0 | 1 | 0 | 0 | 0 |
| | MF | (England) ENG | Jimmy Henderson | 2 | 0 | 1 | 0 | 1 | 0 |
| | MF | | Frank Herring | 2 | 0 | 2 | 0 | 0 | 0 |
| | MF | (England) ENG | Charlie Milne(s) | 40 | 6 | 36 | 4 | 4 | 2 |
| | MF | | W. Greenhalgh | 4 | 0 | 4 | 0 | 0 | 0 |
| | MF | | John Meehan | 26 | 1 | 23 | 1 | 3 | 0 |
| | MF | | A. Eccles | 9 | 2 | 9 | 2 | 0 | 0 |
| | MF | | A. Walker | 25 | 8 | 21 | 7 | 4 | 1 |
| | MF | | J. Cooper | 11 | 4 | 11 | 4 | 0 | 0 |
| | MF | | Wilkinson | 1 | 0 | 1 | 0 | 0 | 0 |
| | MF | | J. Davie | 6 | 0 | 6 | 0 | 0 | 0 |
| | MF | | Tattersall | 3 | 0 | 3 | 0 | 0 | 0 |
| | MF | | W. Taylor | 4 | 0 | 4 | 0 | 0 | 0 |
| | MF | | R. Brindle | 3 | 0 | 3 | 0 | 0 | 0 |
| | MF | | T.A. Parry | 7 | 3 | 7 | 3 | 0 | 0 |
| | MF | | L. Kenyon | 4 | 0 | 4 | 0 | 0 | 0 |
| | FW | (England) ENG | Willie Page | 1 | 0 | 1 | 0 | 0 | 0 |
| | MF | (England) ENG | John Lee | 1 | 0 | 1 | 0 | 0 | 0 |
| | MF | | H. Challinor | 2 | 0 | 1 | 0 | 1 | 0 |
| | MF | | Turner | 5 | 0 | 5 | 0 | 0 | 0 |
| | FW | (England) ENG | James Mills | 20 | 7 | 19 | 7 | 1 | 0 |
| | FW | | Tom Makin | 10 | 0 | 10 | 0 | 0 | 0 |
| | MF | | Wolfe | 2 | 0 | 2 | 0 | 0 | 0 |
| | MF | | J.C. Cam | 2 | 0 | 2 | 0 | 0 | 0 |
| | MF | (England) ENG | Jack Hill | 1 | 0 | 1 | 0 | 0 | 0 |
| | MF | | Farnworth | 1 | 0 | 1 | 0 | 0 | 0 |
| | FW | | R. Bellis | 1 | 0 | 1 | 0 | 0 | 0 |
| | FW | | A. Brown | 2 | 0 | 2 | 0 | 0 | 0 |
| | FW | | T. Smith | 2 | 0 | 2 | 0 | 0 | 0 |
| | FW | | W.H. Oliver | 1 | 0 | 1 | 0 | 0 | 0 |
| | FW | | Tom Hesmondhalgh | 25 | 12 | 25 | 12 | 0 | 0 |
| | MF | | H. Butterworth | 2 | 0 | 2 | 0 | 0 | 0 |
| | FW | | Butterworth | 1 | 1 | 1 | 1 | 0 | 0 |
| | FW | | F. Stott | 1 | 0 | 1 | 0 | 0 | 0 |
| | FW | | P.G. Jephcott | 1 | 0 | 1 | 0 | 0 | 0 |
| | FW | | A. Newman | 1 | 0 | 1 | 0 | 0 | 0 |
| | FW | (England) ENG | Davie Ross | 2 | 0 | 2 | 0 | 0 | 0 |
| | FW | | W. Hales | 1 | 0 | 1 | 0 | 0 | 0 |
| | FW | | H. Daniels | 28 | 3 | 25 | 2 | 3 | 1 |
| | FW | | A. Lingard | 28 | 5 | 24 | 5 | 4 | 0 |
| | MF | (England) ENG | Harry Mallalieu | 18 | 6 | 17 | 4 | 1 | 2 |

Squad Statistics (Non-Competitive)

=== Appearances and goals (non-competitive) ===
| No. | Pos | Nat | Player | Total | | Lancs Jnr Cup | | Manc Cup | |
| No. | Pos | Nat | Player | Apps | Goals | Apps | Goals | Apps | Goals |
|---|---|---|---|---|---|---|---|---|---|
| | GK | | T.Berry | 0 | 0 | 0 | 0 | 0 | 0 |
| | GK | | J. Stott | 0 | 0 | 0 | 0 | 0 | 0 |
| | MF | (England) ENG | Frank Sheldon | 0 | 0 | 0 | 0 | 0 | 0 |
| | GK | | Bould Hurst | 2 | 0 | 1 | 0 | 1 | 0 |
| | GK | | W. Plumley | 0 | 0 | 0 | 0 | 0 | 0 |
| | FW | | George Horridge | 0 | 0 | 0 | 0 | 0 | 0 |
| | DF | | H. Anderson | 0 | 0 | 0 | 0 | 0 | 0 |
| | DF | | P. Pickup | 0 | 0 | 0 | 0 | 0 | 0 |
| | DF | | J. Taylor | 0 | 0 | 0 | 0 | 0 | 0 |
| | DF | (England) ENG | Jimmy Nuttall | 2 | 0 | 1 | 0 | 1 | 0 |
| | MF | (England) ENG | Jim Tully | 2 | 0 | 1 | 0 | 1 | 0 |
| | MF | (England) ENG | Herbert Tierney | 1 | 0 | 1 | 0 | 0 | 0 |
| | DF | | F. Wood | 1 | 0 | 0 | 0 | 1 | 0 |
| | DF | (England) ENG | Tom Bamford | 1 | 0 | 1 | 0 | 0 | 0 |
| | DF | | J. Higgins | 0 | 0 | 0 | 0 | 0 | 0 |
| | DF | | Dixon | 0 | 0 | 0 | 0 | 0 | 0 |
| | MF | (England) ENG | Jimmy Henderson | 0 | 0 | 0 | 0 | 0 | 0 |
| | MF | | Frank Herring | 0 | 0 | 0 | 0 | 0 | 0 |
| | MF | (England) ENG | Charlie Milne(s) | 2 | 0 | 1 | 0 | 1 | 0 |
| | MF | | W. Greenhalgh | 0 | 0 | 0 | 0 | 0 | 0 |
| | MF | | John Meehan | 2 | 0 | 1 | 0 | 1 | 0 |
| | MF | | A. Eccles | 0 | 0 | 0 | 0 | 0 | 0 |
| | MF | | A. Walker | 2 | 0 | 1 | 0 | 1 | 0 |
| | MF | | J. Cooper | 0 | 0 | 0 | 0 | 0 | 0 |
| | MF | | Wilkinson | 0 | 0 | 0 | 0 | 0 | 0 |
| | MF | | J. Davie | 0 | 0 | 0 | 0 | 0 | 0 |
| | MF | | Tattersall | 0 | 0 | 0 | 0 | 0 | 0 |
| | MF | | W. Taylor | 1 | 0 | 0 | 0 | 1 | 0 |
| | MF | | R. Brindle | 0 | 0 | 0 | 0 | 0 | 0 |
| | MF | | T.A. Parry | 0 | 0 | 0 | 0 | 0 | 0 |
| | MF | | L. Kenyon | 0 | 0 | 0 | 0 | 0 | 0 |
| | FW | (England) ENG | Willie Page | 0 | 0 | 0 | 0 | 0 | 0 |
| | MF | (England) ENG | John Lee | 0 | 0 | 0 | 0 | 0 | 0 |
| | MF | | H. Challinor | 1 | 0 | 1 | 0 | 0 | 0 |
| | MF | | Turner | 0 | 0 | 0 | 0 | 0 | 0 |
| | FW | (England) ENG | James Mills | 1 | 0 | 1 | 0 | 0 | 0 |
| | FW | | Tom Makin | 0 | 0 | 0 | 0 | 0 | 0 |
| | MF | | Wolfe | 0 | 0 | 0 | 0 | 0 | 0 |
| | MF | | J.C. Cam | 0 | 0 | 0 | 0 | 0 | 0 |
| | MF | (England) ENG | Jack Hill | 0 | 0 | 0 | 0 | 0 | 0 |
| | MF | | Farnworth | 0 | 0 | 0 | 0 | 0 | 0 |
| | FW | | R. Bellis | 0 | 0 | 0 | 0 | 0 | 0 |
| | FW | | A. Brown | 0 | 0 | 0 | 0 | 0 | 0 |
| | FW | | T. Smith | 0 | 0 | 0 | 0 | 0 | 0 |
| | FW | | W.H. Oliver | 0 | 0 | 0 | 0 | 0 | 0 |
| | FW | | Tom Hesmondhalgh | 1 | 0 | 0 | 0 | 1 | 0 |
| | MF | | H. Butterworth | 0 | 0 | 0 | 0 | 0 | 0 |
| | FW | | Butterworth | 0 | 0 | 0 | 0 | 0 | 0 |
| | FW | | F. Stott | 0 | 0 | 0 | 0 | 0 | 0 |
| | FW | | P.G. Jephcott | 0 | 0 | 0 | 0 | 0 | 0 |
| | FW | | A. Newman | 0 | 0 | 0 | 0 | 0 | 0 |
| | FW | (England) ENG | Davie Ross | 0 | 0 | 0 | 0 | 0 | 0 |
| | FW | | W. Hales | 0 | 0 | 0 | 0 | 0 | 0 |
| | FW | | H. Daniels | 1 | 0 | 1 | 0 | 0 | 0 |
| | FW | | A. Lingard | 1 | 0 | 1 | 0 | 0 | 0 |
| | MF | (England) ENG | Harry Mallalieu | 1 | 0 | 0 | 0 | 1 | 0 |

== Competitions ==
=== Central League ===
| 30 August 1919 1 | Rochdale | 2–1 | Stalybridge Celtic | Rochdale |
| | Eccles; Cooper | | Goal | Stadium: Spotland Stadium; Attendance: 1000 |

| 2 September 1919 2 | Rochdale | 1–4 | Crewe Alexandra | Rochdale |
| | Cooper (pen.) | | Goal | Stadium: Spotland Stadium; Attendance: 1000 |

| 6 September 1919 3 | Southport | 2–2 | Rochdale | Southport |
| | Goal | | Eccles; Cooper | Stadium: Haig Avenue; Attendance: 1500 |

| 10 September 1919 4 | Crewe Alexandra | 2–0 | Rochdale | Crewe |
| | Goal | | | Stadium: Gresty Road |

| 13 September 1919 5 | Blackpool Reserves | 3–0 | Rochdale | Blackpool |
| | Goal | | | Stadium: Bloomfield Road; Attendance: 3000 |

| 20 September 1919 6 | Rochdale | 2–1 | Blackpool Reserves | Rochdale |
| | Lingard; Milne(s) | | Goal | Stadium: Spotland Stadium; Attendance: 1000 |

| 27 September 1919 7 | Bolton Wanderers Reserves | 7–1 | Rochdale | Bolton |
| | Goal | | Daniels | Stadium: Burnden Park |

| 4 October 1919 8 | Rochdale | 2–0 | Everton Reserves | Rochdale |
| | Lingard; Walker | | | Stadium: Spotland Stadium; Attendance: 800 |

| 11 October 1919 9 | Huddersfield Town Reserves | 3–0 | Rochdale | Huddersfield |
| | Goal | | | Stadium: Leeds Road |

| 18 October 1919 10 | Rochdale | 1–3 | Oldham Athletic Reserves | Rochdale |
| | Tierney | | Goal | Stadium: Spotland Stadium; Attendance: 1500 |

| 25 October 1919 11 | Manchester United Reserves | 2–2 | Rochdale | Manchester |
| | Goal | | Cooper; Daniels | Stadium: Old Trafford |

| 1 November 1919 12 | Rochdale | 3–2 | Manchester United Reserves | Rochdale |
| | Parry; Walker | | Goal | Stadium: Spotland Stadium |

| 8 November 1919 13 | Stalybridge Celtic | 2–0 | Rochdale | Stalybridge |
| | Goal | | | Stadium: Bower Fold; Attendance: 3000 |

| 15 November 1919 14 | Rochdale | 6–0 | Bolton Wanderers Reserves | Rochdale |
| | Walker; Lingard; Meehan | | | Stadium: Spotland Stadium |

| 13 December 1919 15 | Manchester City Reserves | 4–1 | Rochdale | Manchester |
| | Goal | | Horridge | Stadium: Hyde Road; Attendance: 5000 |

| 25 December 1919 16 | Oldham Athletic Reserves | 4–2 | Rochdale | Oldham |
| | Goal | | Hesmondhalgh; Lingard | Stadium: Boundary Park |

| 26 December 1919 17 | Rochdale | 4–4 | Bury Reserves | Rochdale |
| | Hesmondhalgh; Horridge; Milne(s) | | Goal | Stadium: Spotland Stadium |

| 27 December 1919 18 | Everton Reserves | 1–1 | Rochdale | Liverpool |
| | Goal | | Tierney | Stadium: Goodison Park |

| 3 January 1920 19 | Rochdale | 0–0 | Bradford City Reserves | Rochdale |
| | | | | Stadium: Spotland Stadium |

| 17 January 1920 20 | Rochdale | 0–1 | Blackburn Rovers Reserves | Rochdale |
| | Goal | | | Stadium: Spotland Stadium |

| 24 January 1920 21 | Nelson | 1–0 | Rochdale | Nelson |
| | Goal | | | Stadium: Seedhill |

| 31 January 1920 22 | Rochdale | 0–1 | Aston Villa Reserves | Rochdale |
| | | | Goal | Stadium: Spotland Stadium |

| 7 February 1920 23 | Rochdale | 3–0 | Nelson | Rochdale |
| | Nuttall (pen.); Mills; Hesmondhalgh | | | Stadium: Spotland Stadium |

| 14 February 1920 24 | Tranmere Rovers | 3–0 | Rochdale | Birkenhead |
| | Goal | | | Stadium: Prenton Park; Attendance: 4500 |

| 17 February 1920 25 | Rochdale | 3–1 | Stockport County Reserves | Rochdale |
| | Hesmondhalgh; Lingard | | Goal | Stadium: Spotland Stadium |

| 21 February 1920 26 | Rochdale | 3–3 | Port Vale | Rochdale or Stoke-on-Trent |
| | Mills; Hesmondhalgh | | Goal | Stadium: Spotland Stadium or Old Recreation Ground |

| 28 February 1920 27 | Rochdale | 1–0 | Liverpool Reserves | Rochdale |
| | Milne(s) | | | Stadium: Spotland Stadium |

| 4 March 1920 28 | Blackburn Rovers Reserves | 0–0 | Rochdale | Blackburn |
| | | | | Stadium: Ewood Park |

| 6 March 1920 29 | Rochdale | 1–1 | Burnley Reserves | Rochdale |
| | Butterworth | | Goal | Stadium: Spotland Stadium |

| 13 March 1920 30 | Burnley Reserves | 2–2 | Rochdale | Burnley |
| | Goal | | Mallalieu; Hesmondhalgh | Stadium: Turf Moor; Attendance: 3000 |

| 18 March 1920 31 | Preston North End Reserves | 2–1 | Rochdale | Preston |
| | Goal | | Mallalieu | Stadium: Deepdale |

| 25 March 1920 32 | Rochdale | 2–0 | Manchester City Reserves | Rochdale |
| | Mills | | | Stadium: Spotland Stadium |

| 27 March 1920 33 | Rochdale | 1–0 | Southport | Rochdale |
| | Hesmondhalgh | | | Stadium: Spotland Stadium |

| 2 April 1920 34 | Rochdale | 3–4 | Huddersfield Town Reserves | Rochdale |
| | Nuttall (pen.); Walker; Mallalieu | | Goal | Stadium: Spotland Stadium; Attendance: 1500 |

| 3 April 1920 35 | Rochdale | 1–3 | Tranmere Rovers | Rochdale |
| | Mills | | Goal | Stadium: Spotland Stadium |

| 5 April 1920 36 | Stockport County Reserves | 0–2 | Rochdale | Stockport |
| | | | Hesmondhalgh; Mills | Stadium: Edgeley Park |

| 6 April 1920 37 | Bury Reserves | 6–1 | Rochdale | Bury |
| | Goal | | Mallalieu | Stadium: Gigg Lane |

| 10 April 1920 38 | Rochdale | 1–5 | Port Vale | Rochdale or Stoke-on-Trent |
| | Milne(s) | | Goal | Stadium: Spotland Stadium or Old Recreation Ground |

| 14 April 1920 39 | Bradford City Reserves | 1–2 | Rochdale | Bradford |
| | Goal | | ? (o.g.); Parry | Stadium: Valley Parade |

| 17 April 1920 40 | Rochdale | 0–2 | Preston North End Reserves | Rochdale |
| | | | Goal | Stadium: Spotland Stadium |

| 24 April 1920 41 | Aston Villa Reserves | 6–1 | Rochdale | Aston |
| | Goal | | Hesmondhalgh | Stadium: Villa Park; Attendance: 14000 |

| 1 May 1920 42 | Liverpool Reserves | 1–1 | Rochdale | Liverpool |
| | Goal | | Hesmondhalgh | Stadium: Anfield; Attendance: 4000 |

=== F.A. Cup ===
| 22 November 1919 Q4 | Rochdale | 1–0 | Monks Hall | Rochdale |
| | H. Daniels | | | Stadium: Spotland Stadium; Attendance: 1000 |

| 6 December 1919 Q5 | Rochdale | 1–0 | Stalybridge Celtic | Rochdale |
| | Milne(s) | | | Stadium: Spotland Stadium; Attendance: 2000 |

| 20 December 1919 Q6 | South Liverpool | 1–2 | Rochdale | Liverpool |
| | Goal | | Milnes; A. Walker | Stadium: Dingle Park; Attendance: 6000 |

| 10 January 1920 1 | Arsenal | 4–2 | Rochdale | London |
| | Pagnam; Rutherford; Groves; Graham | Report | Mallalieu | Stadium: Arsenal Stadium; Attendance: 27000 |

=== Lancashire Junior Cup ===
| 29 November 1919 | Skelmersdale | 1–0 | Rochdale | Skelmersdale |
| | Goal | | | Stadium: Sandy Lane |

=== Manchester Cup ===
| 30 March 1920 | Rochdale | 0–1 | Mossley | Rochdale |
| | | | Goal | Stadium: Spotland Stadium; Attendance: 1000 |
