= Albert Pearson =

Albert Pearson may refer to:

- Albert J. Pearson (1846–1905), U.S. Representative from Ohio
- Albert Pearson (footballer) (1892–1975), English footballer
- Albert H. Pearson (1920–1963), American farmer and politician
- Albie Pearson (1934–2023), American baseball player.
