= Dai Hopkins =

Dai Hopkins may refer to:

- Idris Hopkins (1910–1994), Welsh footballer for Brentford
- Dai Hopkins (footballer, born 1902) (1902–1943), Welsh footballer for Rochdale
