= William Prouse =

William Prouse may refer to:

- William Prouse (architect) (1879–1956), New Zealand architect, see Hotel St George, Wellington
- Bill Prouse (1900–1984), English footballer
