= Stokoe =

Stokoe is a surname. Notable people with the surname include:

- Bob Stokoe (1930–2004), English footballer and manager
- Dennis Stokoe (1925–2005), English footballer
- Elizabeth Stokoe, British academic
- Graham Stokoe (born 1975), English former footballer
- James Stokoe (born 1985), Canadian comic book artist
- Jimmy Stokoe, (1888–1970), English footballer
- John Stokoe (fl. late 19th century), Tyneside author and historian
- Matt Stokoe (born 1989), English actor
- Matthew Stokoe (born 1963), British writer and screenwriter
- T. H. Stokoe (1833–1903), English clergyman and headmaster
- William Stokoe (1919–2000), American sign language linguist
- William N. Stokoe (1892–1958), British organic chemist

== See also ==
- Stokoe notation
