= William Sandham =

William Sandham may refer to:

- William Sandham (rugby) (1879–?), Welsh rugby union and rugby league player
- William Sandham (footballer) (1898–1963), English footballer
