= Edward Stirling =

Edward Stirling may refer to:

- Edward Charles Stirling, Australian anthropologist and professor of physiology
- Edward Stirling (politician), his father, early settler of South Australia and member of the Legislative Council
- Edward Stirling (playwright), English stage manager, actor and dramatist
- Ed Stirling Scottish footballer

== See also ==
- Edward Stirling Dickson, Royal Navy officer
