= Teddy Roseboom =

Scottish footballer

Personal information
- Full name: Edward Roseboom
- Date of birth: 24 November 1896
- Place of birth: Govan, Scotland
- Date of death: 27 February 1980 (aged 83)
- Place of death: Kensington, England
- Height: 5 ft 7 in (1.70 m)
- Position: Inside forward

Senior career*
Years	Team	Apps	(Gls)
- Strathclyde
1919–1920	Fulham	0	(0)
1920–1921	Ton Pentre		
- Pontypridd
1921	Cardiff City	0	(0)
1921–1923	Blackpool	20	(2)
1923–1924	Nelson	12	(1)
1924	Clapton Orient	3	(0)
1924–1925	Rochdale	30	(4)
1925–1929	Chesterfield	124	(38)
1929–1930	Mansfield Town		
1930–1931	Newark Town		
1931–193?	Mexborough Athletic		
- * Club domestic league appearances and goals

Edward Roseboom (24 November 1896 – 27 February 1980) was a Scottish professional footballer who scored 45 goals from 189 Football League matches playing as an inside forward for Blackpool, Nelson, Clapton Orient, Rochdale and Chesterfield. He began his career in junior football with Strathclyde, was on the books of Fulham and Cardiff City without appearing for their league side, played in the Southern League for Ton Pentre, and appeared for Midland League clubs Mansfield Town, Newark Town and Mexborough Athletic.

== Life and career ==
=== Early life and career ===
Roseboom was born in Govan, Lanarkshire, in 1896. He played junior football with Strathclyde and worked as a telephone cable jointer. During the First World War, he served with the Gordon Highlanders, married, and fathered a daughter.

After demobilisation, he came to England and joined Fulham of the Football League Second Division. Although he never played for their league side, he earned himself a good reputation, and in the 1920 close season he signed for Ton Pentre of the Southern League's Welsh Section. He scored regularly, including five goals in an 8–0 defeat of Llanelly, and was selected in April 1921 for the Welsh Section's representative team to face their English counterparts. A couple of weeks later, amid interest from established Football League clubs including Everton and an offer from Liverpool, he signed for Cardiff City, who were on the verge of promotion to the top flight.

Not long afterwards, Roseboom was arrested and charged with neglect of his four-year-old daughter, who was living in Dunfermline with his estranged wife, by "failing to provide her with adequate food and clothing". Pointedly described by the Evening Telegraph's reporter as a "well-dressed young man", Roseboom pleaded guilty at Dunfermline Sheriff Court. His argument that a custodial sentence would be a "hardship upon him" by interrupting his football training did not impress the sheriff, who sentenced him to two months' imprisonment. He returned to Cardiff, and appeared for their Welsh League side but not for the first team.

=== The Football League ===
In December 1921, he was sold to Blackpool of the Second Division for an undisclosed fee. He went straight into the league eleven for a draw with Bradford Park Avenue, and the Lancashire Daily Post's "Perseus" was complimentary: "Roseboom played football of a more collected and finished type. He has a sound eye for position, has more than one way of achieving the same end, and is not afraid to work the ball, and if I mistake not, he ought to be a distinct asset". Despite the promising start, he never established himself as a regular selection, and in the 18 months that he spent with Blackpool he played 20 Second Division matches and scored twice.

Listed for transfer at a fee of £150, Roseboom joined Nelson in August 1923 for what was to be their only season in the Second Division. They were expecting "a craftsman who works good openings for others", and Roseboom did indeed prove himself both creative and technically clever, but his workrate was not of comparable quality. In February 1924, after twelve appearances and a single goal, Roseboom joined Clapton Orient in exchange for Harry Higginbotham. He made a "sparkling display" on his first-team debut a month later, in a goalless draw at home to Southampton. The Athletic News' correspondent highlighted how "the newcomer played with great judgment, and he rarely gave Smith a poor pass, while the way he hooked the ball into the goalmouth was a lesson to some his colleagues." He played twice more before being granted a free transfer and returning to Lancashire with Third Division North club Rochdale.

For the first time in his Football League career, Roseboom was a regular first-team selection. He scored in a 3–2 win against Wigan Borough in the second match of the season and produced winning goals against Chesterfield in October and in the last minute of the match against Tranmere Rovers two weeks later. He played in 30 of the 42 league matches, and scored four goals. Nevertheless, he was placed on the transfer list, and signed for another Northern Section club, Chesterfield.

=== Chesterfield ===
Roseboom started his Chesterfield career with their reserves in the Midland Combination, opening the scoring in a 2–2 draw away to Halifax Town's reserves, and made his first-team debut against Bradford Park Avenue on 31 August, standing in at inside left for the injured Norman Whitfield. When Whitfield returned to fitness Roseboom returned to the reserves, but after recovering from pleurisy to score four times in a 7–0 defeat of Doncaster Rovers' reserves, he took over the inside-right position in the first team and held it to the end of the season. He scored 14 times in 42 appearances in league and FA Cup, reaching double figures of goals in a season for the first time in his Football League career. A highlight of his season was the 5–2 defeat of Hartlepools United, in which he scored twice in the first 12 minutes, struck the crossbar, and left the field to a "storm of applause"; according to the Sheffield Daily Telegraph, the first goal "was a masterpiece. He beat three opponents by delightful footcraft, and hooked the ball into the net with such speed that Cowell scarcely saw it." When not scoring, he "contributed materially towards his team's success by his clever scheming and delightful passes" in support of the prolific Jimmy Cookson and others.

Roseboom began the new season in fine form, scoring two "clever" goals, hitting the woodwork twice, and producing some "very pretty" scheming in a 5–1 win against Southport in mid-September, but the after-effects of an injury sustained two weeks later meant he was in and out of the team for some months, and not fully fit while in it. In December, he was dropped to the Midland Combination team for two matches, and submitted a transfer request. Having returned to the league side, he was omitted again, this time for a four-match spell, in March, but regained a place at inside left to accommodate Harold Roberts on the right and returned to form. He finished the season with 12 goals from 36 appearances in league and FA Cup.

He appeared only intermittently at the start of the 1927–28 season, and when dropped early in December as one of seven changes made to the team, did not return until April. He made 18 appearances in league and FA Cup and scored four goals. In Ollie Thompson's benefit match, played against Northern Nomads, Roseboom converted a penalty in unusual style: he "gently kicked the ball, and it lightly sailed over and dropped into the back of the net, apparently much to the surprise of the goalkeeper" – nearly 50 years before the original Panenka kick.

Roseboom signed on for a fourth season with Chesterfield and resumed his status as a first-team regular. He scored in each of the first four matches, and took his total to eight from nine, including a last-minute winner away to his former club, Nelson. By Christmas, he had ten league goals and two in the FA Cup. While out injured, he was tasked with watching their third-round opponents, First Division team Huddersfield Town; Chesterfield lost the Cup tie 7–1. Once fit and back in the side, he played regularly until the end of the season, apart from a bout of influenza in March. His 15 goals from 37 matches took his totals for the club to 45 goals from 133 appearances in league and FA Cup over a four-year spell, during which time he "built up a great reputation for cleverness and shrewd positioning". After Chesterfield chose not to retain his services for a fifth season, the Sheffield Independent published a tribute to "an artist with the ball and a clever schemer" who had played a major part in the development of Cookson as a goalscorer, and suggested that the 1929 eleven would have had a good chance of promotion "if only they had had a centre forward who could have turned his true passes to account."

=== Later life and career ===
Reigning Midland League champions Mansfield Town signed Roseboom on for the 1929–30 season. He played regularly but was not retained, spent the following season with another Midland League team, Newark Town, and signed for yet another, Mexborough Athletic, in October 1931. Roseboom still lived in Chesterfield while playing Midland League football, but when his career ended through injury in 1932, he left the area and went to work in the building industry in London.

Roseboom died in Kensington, London, in 1980 at the age of 83.

== Career statistics ==
Appearances and goals by club, season and competition
Club	Season	League			FA Cup		Total	
Club	Season	Division	Apps	Goals	Apps	Goals	Apps	Goals
Fulham	1919–20	Second Division	0	0	0	0	0	0
Cardiff City	1920–21	Second Division	0	0	—		0	0
Cardiff City	1921–22	Second Division	0	0	—		0	0
Cardiff City	Total		0	0	—		0	0
Blackpool	1921–22	Second Division	7	0	1	0	8	1
Blackpool	1922–23	Second Division	13	2	0	0	13	2
Blackpool	Total		20	2	1	0	21	2
Nelson	1923–24	Second Division	12	1	2	0	14	1
Clapton Orient	1923–24	Second Division	3	0	—		3	0
Rochdale	1924–25	Third Division North	30	4	2	0	32	4
Chesterfield	1925–26	Third Division North	39	13	3	1	42	14
Chesterfield	1926–27	Third Division North	33	9	2	3	35	12
Chesterfield	1927–28	Third Division North	18	3	1	1	19	4
Chesterfield	1928–29	Third Division North	34	13	3	2	37	15
Chesterfield	Total		124	38	9	7	133	45
Career totals			189	45	14	7	203	52
