= Jimmy Crabtree (footballer, born 1895) =

English footballer (1895–1965)

Personal information
- Full name: James Joseph Crabtree
- Date of birth: 15 February 1895
- Place of birth: Clitheroe, England
- Date of death: 4 December 1965 (aged 69)
- Place of death: Clitheroe, England
- Height: 6 ft 1 in (1.85 m)
- Position: Goalkeeper

Senior career*
Years	Team	Apps	(Gls)
1911–1912	Stonyhurst College		
1912–1913	Clitheroe Amateurs		
1913–1919	Blackburn Rovers	12	(0)
- → Preston North End (guest)
1921–1923	Rochdale	58	(2)
1923–1924	Accrington Stanley	7	(0)
1929	Colne Town		

International career
1914	England Amateurs	1	(0)
- * Club domestic league appearances and goals

James Joseph Crabtree MC (15 February 1895 – 4 December 1965) was an English professional footballer who played as a goalkeeper in the Football League for Rochdale, Blackburn Rovers and Accrington Stanley. He was capped by England at amateur level and played one Football League match as an inside forward for Rochdale, for whom he scored two goals. Crabtree later served as a linesman in the Football League and as a referee in the Lancashire Combination.

== Personal life ==
Crabtree attended Stonyhurst College. On 5 September 1914, a month after the outbreak of the First World War, Crabtree enlisted as a private in the Loyal North Lancashire Regiment. Just over a year later, he was commissioned as a second lieutenant. Crabtree was wounded near Morval during the Battle of the Somme in September 1916 and saw further action at Arras and Passchendaele after his recovery. He won a Military Cross for "conspicuous gallantry and devotion to duty" on 26 September 1917. A month later, he was wounded for a second time and did not serve on the Western Front for the remainder of the war. After being promoted to captain, Crabtree was posted briefly to Central Asia before leaving the army.

== Career statistics ==
Appearances and goals by club, season and competition
Club	Season	League			FA Cup		Other		Total	
Club	Season	Division	Apps	Goals	Apps	Goals	Apps	Goals	Apps	Goals
Rochdale	1921–22	Third Division North	34	0	1	0	2 (Note: 1 appearance in Lancashire Senior Cup, 1 appearance in Manchester Senior Cup)	0	37	0
Rochdale	1922–23	Third Division North	24	2	1	0	4 (Note: Appearances in Lancashire Senior Cup)	0	29	2
Career total			58	2	2	0	6	0	64	2

== Honours ==
Blackburn Rovers

- Football League First Division: 1913–14
