= William Bradbury (footballer) =

English footballer

Personal information
- Full name: William Henry Bradbury
- Date of birth: 1884
- Place of birth: Sudbury, Derbyshire, England
- Date of death: 1966 (aged 81–82)
- Position: Half-back

Youth career
- May Bank
- Newcastle Swifts

Senior career*
Years	Team	Apps	(Gls)
1903–1907	Burslem Port Vale	12	(0)
- Fegg Hayes
1910–1911	Stoke	28	(0)
1911	Aberdare		
1911–1913	Oldham Athletic	7	(2)
- Scunthorpe United
1919–1921	Oldham Athletic	67	(3)
1921–1923	Rochdale	12	(0)
- Burton Town
- * Club domestic league appearances and goals

William Henry Bradbury (1884–1966) was an English footballer who played at half-back for Burslem Port Vale, Stoke, Aberdare, Oldham Athletic, Scunthorpe United, Rochdale and Burton Town.

== Career ==
Bradbury played for May Bank and Newcastle Swifts before joining Burslem Port Vale in May 1903. He made his debut on Boxing Day 1903, in a 3–1 defeat by Bristol City at the Athletic Ground. He played three further Second Division games in the rest of the 1903–04 season, and was used as an emergency player in the 1904–05, 1905–06, and 1906–07 campaigns. The club then went into financial meltdown and liquidation, at which point he was released. He joined Fegg Hayes and then moved on to Stoke, playing 28 Birmingham & District League / Southern League games for the "Potters" in the 1910–11 season. He later played for Aberdare, Oldham Athletic (in two spells), Scunthorpe United, Rochdale and Burton Town.

== Career statistics ==
Appearances and goals by club, season and competition
Club	Season	League			FA Cup		Total	
Club	Season	Division	Apps	Goals	Apps	Goals	Apps	Goals
Burslem Port Vale	1903–04	Second Division	4	0	0	0	4	0
Burslem Port Vale	1904–05	Second Division	3	0	0	0	3	0
Burslem Port Vale	1905–06	Second Division	4	0	0	0	4	0
Burslem Port Vale	1906–07	Second Division	1	0	0	0	1	0
Burslem Port Vale	Total		12	0	0	0	12	0
Stoke	1910–11	Birmingham & District League; Southern League Division Two	28	0	3	0	31	0
Oldham Athletic	1911–12	First Division	7	2	0	0	7	2
Oldham Athletic	1912–13	First Division	0	0	1	0	1	0
Oldham Athletic	1919–20	First Division	39	3	1	0	40	3
Oldham Athletic	1920–21	First Division	28	0	1	0	29	0
Oldham Athletic	Total		74	5	3	0	77	5
Rochdale	1922–23	Third Division North	12	0	1	0	13	0
Career total			126	5	7	0	133	5
