= Bill Laverick =

English footballer (1897–1975)

Personal information
- Full name: William Laverick
- Date of birth: 11 September 1897
- Place of birth: Pelton Fell, County Durham, England
- Date of death: 24 June 1975 (aged 77)
- Place of death: Murton, County Durham, England
- Height: 5 ft 6 1/2 in (1.69 m)
- Position: Outside left

Senior career*
Years	Team	Apps	(Gls)
- Pelton Fell
- Annfield Plain
19??–1921	Darlington		
1921–1923	Chester-le-Street Town		
1923–1928	Ashington	92	(13)
1928	West Stanley		
1928	Halifax Town	2	(0)
1928–19??	Murton Colliery Welfare		
- * Club domestic league appearances and goals

William Laverick (11 September 1897 – 24 June 1975) was an English footballer who played as an outside left in the Football League for Ashington and Halifax Town. He also played non-league football for clubs including Pelton Fell, Annfield Plain, Darlington, Chester-le-Street Town, West Stanley and Murton Colliery Welfare.

== Life and career ==
Laverick was born in Pelton Fell, County Durham, and played football for his village club before the First World War. He went on to play for North-Eastern League clubs Annfield Plain and Darlington, for whom he appeared in the 1920–21 FA Cup against Blackpool of the Football League Second Division. He crossed for Dick Healey's opening goal in a 2–2 draw, but Tommy Winship returned to the team for the replay. He continued his tour of the North-Eastern League with two seasons at Chester-le-Street Town, for whom he scored regularly and attracted interest from a variety of clubs from the Football League. Preferring to stay in the north of England, he accepted an offer from Ashington of the Third Division North.

He made a bright start – the Derby Daily Telegraph picked him out as "a clever young left winger [who] has proved himself quite fitted and talented enough for Northern Section football" – and soon established himself in the senior eleven, where he remained more or less a regular for the first three seasons of his Ashington career. His appearances declined, and at the end of the 1926–27 season the club did not offer to renew his contract. He was transfer-listed at a fee of £100, but there were no takers, and in 1928, he applied for and was granted a free transfer. He scored 13 goals from 98 Football League appearances for Ashington.

Laverick made a brief return to North-Eastern League football with West Stanley, and a similarly brief one to the Third Division with Halifax Town, for whom he played twice in September 1928, before joining Murton Colliery Welfare of the Wearside League. He stayed with the club, helping them reach the fourth qualifying round of the 1933–34 FA Cup, in which they took Scarborough to a replay, and appeared on the losing side in the 1935 Durham County Cup final, before retiring as a player to become the club's trainer in 1936 – although the Sunderland Echo still expected his crossing ability to be called upon in the future.

He died in Murton in 1975 at the age of 77.
