= Joe Walters (English footballer) =

English footballer

Personal information
- Full name: Joseph Walters
- Date of birth: 11 December 1886
- Place of birth: Stourbridge, England
- Date of death: 24 December 1923 (aged 37)
- Place of death: New Moston, England
- Positions: Inside forward; outside left

Senior career*
Years	Team	Apps	(Gls)
1901–1902	Wordsley Athletic		
1902–1905	Stourbridge		
1905–1912	Aston Villa	113	(41)
1912–1920	Oldham Athletic	110	(35)
1916–1917	→ West Ham United (guest)	3	(0)
- Accrington Stanley
1920–1921	Southend United	28	(5)
1921–1922	Millwall	22	(5)
1922–1923	Rochdale	24	(6)
1923	Manchester North End		
1923	Crewe Alexandra	1	(0)
- * Club domestic league appearances and goals

Joseph Walters (11 December 1886 – 24 December 1923) was an English professional footballer who played as a forward in the Football League, most notably for Aston Villa and Oldham Athletic. He also played league football for Southend United, Rochdale, Millwall and Crewe Alexandra.

== Personal life ==
Walters was married with three children. He served as an Air Mechanic 1st Class with the Royal Air Force during the First World War and worked at No. 1 (Southern), No. 9 and No. 10 aircraft repair depots. Walters died of pneumonia in December 1923.

== Career statistics ==
Appearances and goals by club, season and competition
Club	Season	League			FA Cup		Other		Total	
Club	Season	Division	Apps	Goals	Apps	Goals	Apps	Goals	Apps	Goals
Aston Villa	1905–06	First Division	7	2	1	0	―		8	2
Aston Villa	1906–07	First Division	26	6	1	0	―		27	6
Aston Villa	1907–08	First Division	4	0	0	0	―		4	0
Aston Villa	1908–09	First Division	15	7	0	0	―		15	7
Aston Villa	1909–10	First Division	14	6	0	0	―		14	6
Aston Villa	1910–11	First Division	28	13	2	0	―		30	13
Aston Villa	1911–12	First Division	19	6	3	0	―		22	6
Aston Villa	Total		113	41	7	0	―		120	41
Southend United	1920–21	Third Division	27	5	4	2	―		31	7
Millwall	1921–22	Third Division	22	5	1	0	―		23	5
Rochdale	1922–23	Third Division North	24	6	1	0	2 (Note: Appearances in Manchester Senior Cup)	1	27	7
Career total			186	57	13	2	2	1	201	60

== Honours ==
Aston Villa

- Football League First Division: 1909–10
