= Frank Lowson (footballer) =

Scottish footballer

Personal information
- Full name: Frank Lowson
- Date of birth: 13 December 1895
- Place of birth: Forfar, Scotland
- Date of death: 1969 (aged 73–74)
- Position: Inside forward

Senior career*
Years	Team	Apps	(Gls)
1919–1920	Forfar Celtic		
1920–1921	Dundee		
1921–1923	Bradford (Park Avenue)	12	(2)
1923–1924	Exeter City	4	(0)
1924–1925	Barrow	26	(2)
1926	Poole		
Total		42	(4)
- * Club domestic league appearances and goals

Frank Lowson (13 December 1895 – 1969) was a Scottish footballer who played in the Football League for Barrow, Bradford (Park Avenue) and Exeter City.
