= Josiah Chapman =

English footballer (1891–1953)

Josiah Chapman (12 October 1891 – 1953) was an English footballer who played as a centre half for Rochdale.
