= Jonah Wilcox =

English footballer

Personal information
- Full name: Jonah Charles Wilcox
- Date of birth: 19 January 1894
- Place of birth: Coleford, England
- Date of death: 5 August 1956 (aged 62)
- Place of death: Shipham, England
- Height: 5 ft 8 1/2 in (1.74 m)
- Position: Centre-forward

Senior career*
| Years | Team | Apps | (Gls) |
| ?–1919 | Abertillery | | |
| 1919–1922 | Bristol City | 59 | (20) |
| 1922–1924 | Bradford Park Avenue | 21 | (5) |
| 1924–1925 | New Brighton | 42 | (35) |
| 1925–1926 | Bristol Rovers | 32 | (19) |
| 1926–1927 | Queens Park Rangers | 9 | (2) |
| 1927–1929 | Gillingham | 56 | (26) |
| 1929–? | Kidderminster Harriers | | |
- * Club domestic league appearances and goals

Jonah Charles Wilcox (19 January 1894 – 5 August 1956) was an English professional footballer. His clubs included Bristol City, New Brighton, Bristol Rovers and Gillingham. He made over 200 Football League appearances.
