= Jock Mills =

Scottish footballer (1900–?)

John Mills (born 9 April 1900) was a Scottish footballer who played as an inside forward in the league for Rochdale, and was on the books of Blackpool without making a first team appearance. He also played non-league football for several other clubs.
