= Bert Cartman =

English footballer

Personal information
- Full name: Herbert Redvers Cartman
- Date of birth: 28 February 1900
- Place of birth: Bolton, England
- Date of death: 5 April 1955 (aged 55)
- Height: 1.68 m (5 ft 6 in)
- Position: Forward

Senior career*
Years	Team	Apps	(Gls)
- Waterloo Temperance
- Bolton Wanderers
1922-1923	Manchester United	3	(0)
- Tranmere Rovers
- * Club domestic league appearances and goals

Herbert Redvers Cartman (28 February 1900 – 5 April 1955) was an English footballer who played as a forward. Born in Bolton, he played for Waterloo Temperance, Bolton Wanderers, Manchester United and Tranmere Rovers.
