= Jack Holland (footballer, born 1897) =

English footballer

Personal information
- Full name: John Holland
- Date of birth: 3 April 1897
- Place of birth: Preston, England
- Date of death: 1979 (aged 83–84)
- Position: Inside forward

Senior career*
Years	Team	Apps	(Gls)
1920–1922	Preston North End	6	(0)
1923–1925	Swansea Town	21	(2)
1925	Wrexham	9	(2)
1925–1926	Crewe Alexandra	23	(3)
1926–1927	Newport County	10	(2)
1927–1929	Clapton Orient	19	(4)
1929–1930	Carlisle United	33	(13)
1930–1931	Barrow	7	(0)
Total		128	(26)
- * Club domestic league appearances and goals

John Holland (3 April 1897 – 1944) was an English footballer who played in the Football League for Barrow, Carlisle United, Clapton Orient, Crewe Alexandra, Newport County, Preston North End, Swansea Town and Wrexham.
