= Dicky Jones (footballer, born 1901) =

English footballer

Personal information
- Full name: Richard Jones
- Date of birth: 6 June 1901
- Place of birth: Ashton-in-Makerfield
- Date of death: 1962 (aged 60–61)
- Position: Wing half

Senior career*
Years	Team	Apps	(Gls)
1919	Skelmersdale United		
1920-1922	Oldham Athletic	25	(0)
1922-1923	Rochdale	32	(0)
1923	Stockport County	6	(0)
1924	Exeter City	10	(0)
1925	Bristol Rovers	8	(0)
1926	Wigan Borough	0	(0)
1926	Chorley		
1926	Colwyn Bay United		
1927	Northwich Victoria		
1930	Great Harwood		
1931	Ashton St Thomas		
Total		81	(0)
- * Club domestic league appearances and goals

Richard Jones (6 June 1901 – 1962) was an English footballer who played as a wing half for Oldham Athletic, Rochdale, Stockport County, Exeter City, and Bristol Rovers.
