= Vince Foweather =

English footballer (1896–1966)

Vincent James Foweather (26 October 1896 – 1966) was an English footballer who played as an inside forward for Oldham Athletic and Rochdale.
