= Billy Fergusson =

English footballer (1897–1986)

William Alexander Fergusson (2 March 1897 – 1986) was an English footballer who played as a centre forward for Oldham Athletic, Rochdale, Reading and Rotherham United. Throughout his career he scored 30 goals in 69 matches and was top goal scorer for Rochdale in the 1925–26 season.
