= Albert H. Pearson =

American farmer and politician

Albert H. Pearson (March 22, 1920 – November 16, 1963) was an American farmer and politician.

Born in Crystal Lake, Illinois, Pearson served in the United States Army during World War II. He studied accounting and was a dairy farmer. Pearson was involved in the Democratic Party, served on the McHenry County, Illinois Board of Commissioners, and on the school board. Pearson served in the Illinois House of Representatives in 1963. He died of a heart attack on his farm while pheasant hunting.
