= Sheepbridge Works F.C. =

Sheepbridge Works
- Full name: Sheepbridge Works Football Club

Sheepbridge Works F.C. was an English association football club based in Chesterfield, Derbyshire.

== Records ==
- Best FA Cup performance: 3rd Qualifying Round, 1893–94, 1996–97
