= Pelton Fell =

Village in County Durham, England

Coordinates: 54.8580°N 1.6066°W

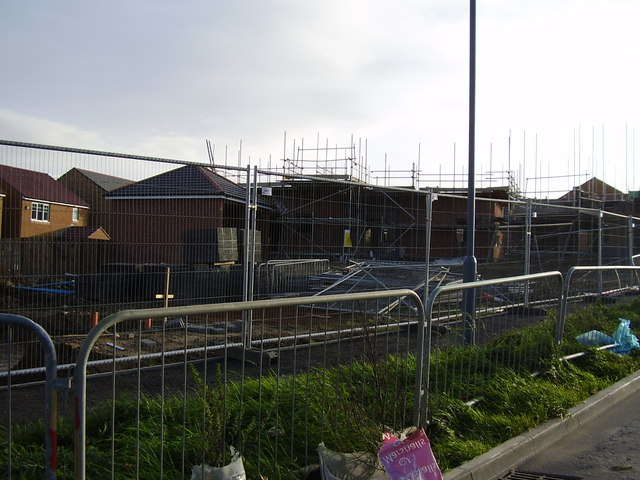
- New housing construction replacing the Whitehills estate, in 2006

- Location within
- OS grid reference: NZ252515
- Unitary authority: County Durham
- Ceremonial county: County Durham
- Region: North East
- Country: England
- Sovereign state: United Kingdom
- Post town: CHESTER-LE-STREET
- Postcode district: DH2
- Dialling code: 0191
- Ambulance: North East
- UK Parliament: North Durham

Pelton Fell is a village in County Durham, England

== History ==
On the site of what is now Pelton Fell, the Miner's Institute was built in 1889 and later expanded in 1909.

A Durham County Council-sponsored redevelopment of the village began in 2004. A significant number of council houses and a small number of private houses were demolished to make way for modern accommodation. A mix of social housing and private housing was built.

== Location ==
Pelton Fell is situated in the north-west of County Durham, to the west of Chester-le-Street. It is the site of a former coal mine. A now-closed railway station used to service both Pelton Fell and nearby Pelton, a village at the northern end of Station Lane. Only traces of the coal mine and the railway station remain today.

== Amenities ==
Pelton Fell is primarily residential. It has a small village shop, a doctor's surgery, and a community centre called the Brockwell Centre. There is a hotel at the far west end of the village called The Moorings, opened in April 2007, which also has a restaurant and bar. This area west of the village is traditionally referred to as Hett Hills, and there are several businesses in the area bearing this name.

The Pelton Fell working men's club was closed and demolished in March 2008, several years after the Colliery Inn was also closed and demolished. The small industrial estate Stella Gill was established to the north of the village in the late 1980s and primarily provides start up premises for small businesses.

A substantial portion of the village is made up of pre- and post-Second World War council housing, many of which (particularly in the north of the village) have been purchased under the Right to Buy scheme. The village is split into two sides by a wooded embankment locally called "The Battery", near which the Twizell Burn flows. On the Station Lane (northern) side is Pelton Fell Memorial Park, which includes a war memorial, tennis courts, children's play area, and a bowling green.

Pelton Fell Football Club is situated just off Station Lane, on the opposite side to the Memorial Park.
