= John Brown (1920s footballer) =

English footballer

John Brown was an English footballer who played as a centre forward for Rochdale in the 1922–23 season.
