= Jimmy Tootle =

English footballer (1899–1947)

Personal information
- Full name: James Tootle
- Date of birth: 22 April 1899
- Place of birth: Skelmersdale, England
- Date of death: 1947 (aged 47–48)
- Position: Full-back

Senior career*
Years	Team	Apps	(Gls)
1918–1919	Old Skelmersdale Rangers		
1919–1922	Skelmersdale United		
1922–1925	Southport	60	(2)
1925–1926	Derby County	7	(0)
1926–1927	Chester		
1927	Skelmersdale United		
Total		67	(2)
- * Club domestic league appearances and goals

James Tootle (22 April 1899 – 1947) was an English footballer who played in the Football League for Derby County and Southport.
