= George Guy (footballer) =

English footballer (1896–1975)

George Guy (1 November 1896 – 1975) was an English footballer who played as a centre forward for Bolton Wanderers and Rochdale. He was joint top goal scorer for Rochdale (with William Sandham) in 1922–23.
