= John Lee (footballer, born 1889) =

English footballer

Personal information
- Full name: John Charles Lee
- Date of birth: 1889
- Place of birth: Morpeth, England
- Position: Outside left

Senior career*
Years	Team	Apps	(Gls)
–1910	Morpeth Town		
1910–1913	Clapton Orient	20	(1)
1913	Exeter City	6	(1)
1913	Newcastle United	0	(0)
- * Club domestic league appearances and goals

John Charles Lee was an English footballer who played in the Football League for Clapton Orient as an outside left.

== Personal life ==
Lee served as a private in the British Army during the First World War.
