= Stan Sayer =

English footballer

Personal information
- Full name: Stanley Charles Sayer
- Date of birth: 2 February 1895
- Place of birth: Chatham, Kent, England
- Date of death: 3 April 1982 (aged 87)
- Height: 5 ft 8 in (1.73 m)
- Positions: Centre forward; inside forward

Senior career*
Years	Team	Apps	(Gls)
- Ramsgate Town
1920–1921	Millwall Athletic	30	(2)
- Northfleet
1922–1925	Tranmere Rovers	79	(30)
1925	New Brighton	12	(5)
1925–1926	Wigan Borough	16	(7)
1926–1927	Lincoln City	32	(6)
1927–1929	Southend United	32	(1)
1929–19??	Dartford		
- Ramsgate Town
- * Club domestic league appearances and goals

Stanley Charles Sayer (2 February 1895 – 3 April 1982) was an English footballer who scored 51 goals from 201 appearances in the Football League playing for Millwall Athletic, Tranmere Rovers, New Brighton, Wigan Borough, Lincoln City and Southend United. He played as a centre forward or inside forward. He also played non-league football for Ramsgate Town, Northfleet and Dartford.
