= Dicky Merritt =

English footballer (1897–1978)

Personal information
- Full name: Richard Merritt
- Date of birth: 22 July 1897
- Place of birth: Shiney Row, County Durham, England
- Date of death: 1978 (aged 80)
- Place of death: Sunderland, England
- Height: 5 ft 8 1/2 in (1.74 m)
- Position: Outside left

Senior career*
Years	Team	Apps	(Gls)
1914–19??	Easington Colliery Welfare		
1921–1923	South Shields	2	(0)
1923–1925	Durham City	72	(13)
1925–1926	Lincoln City	22	(3)
1926	Washington Colliery		
1926–1929	York City	70	(31)
1929–1930	Notts County	1	(0)
1930–193?	Easington Colliery Welfare		
- * Club domestic league appearances and goals

Richard Merritt (22 July 1897 – 1978) was an English footballer who scored 16 goals from 97 appearances in the Football League playing as an outside left for South Shields, Durham City, Lincoln City and Notts County. He played in the Midland League for York City, and also played non-league football for Easington Colliery Welfare and Washington Colliery.

== Life and career ==
Merritt was born in Shiney Row, County Durham, in July 1897. He played for Easington Colliery Welfare before the First World War, and afterwards signed for South Shields of the Football League Second Division. He made his Football League debut on 8 April 1922, in a 4–0 defeat away to Blackpool, and played once more the following season, before moving on to Durham City of the Third Division North. He was a first-team regular in the side for two seasons, making 73 appearances, and was popular with the supporters, despite a tendency to shoot from unlikely positions on the pitch. He was transfer-listed at the end of the season, then spent a season with another third-tier club, Lincoln City, half the time in the first team and the rest with the reserves in the Midland League.

Having failed to find a new employer at Football League level, Merritt was very briefly attached to Washington Colliery before joining Midland League club York City for the 1926–27 season. He played and scored regularly for a season and a half before breaking his ankle during a match in January 1928. He regained fitness in time to play in the last match of the season, and was selected for the annual match between the league champions, in this case Gainsborough Trinity, and an eleven representing the rest of the league. He finished his three seasons with York City with 31 Midland League goals from 70 matches, and was again selected for the Rest against champions Mansfield Town.

He signed for Second Division Notts County for the 1929–30 season, but although he scored freely for their reserves in the Midland League, he found it difficult to break through the first team. He made his debut on 30 November 1929 against Tottenham Hotspur, but that was his only first-team appearance and was given a free transfer at the end of the season. He returned to the north east and played for his former club, Easington Colliery Welfare.

The 1939 Register finds Merritt living with his wife, Edith, and two children in Henry Street, Houghton-le-Spring, and working as a general labourer. He died in Sunderland in 1978 at the age of 80.
