= Billy Kettle =

English footballer

Personal information
- Full name: William Walderham Kettle
- Date of birth: 10 September 1898
- Place of birth: South Shields, England
- Date of death: 12 October 1980 (aged 82)
- Place of death: Acomb, England
- Height: 5 ft 8 in (1.73 m)
- Positions: Outside left; inside left

Senior career*
Years	Team	Apps	(Gls)
1918–1919	Leeds City	0	(0)
1919	South Shields	0	(0)
1919–1920	Newcastle United	0	(0)
1920–1921	Ebbw Vale		
1921–1922	Southend United	31	(1)
1922–1923	Grimsby Town	16	(3)
1923–1924	Southport	18	(1)
1924–1926	Wigan Borough	39	(13)
- * Club domestic league appearances and goals

William Walderham Kettle (10 September 1898 – 12 October 1980) was an English professional footballer who played as an outside left in the Football League for Wigan Borough, Southend United, Southport and Grimsby Town. He was an English Schools' international.

== Personal life ==
Two days prior to his 18th birthday in September 1916, Kettle enlisted as a private in the Durham Light Infantry. He was wounded and lost a toe during the course of his service in the First World War. Kettle was discharged from the army in March 1919. He married in 1923 and had four children. As of 1939, Kettle was working as a drayman for Westoe Brewery.

== Career statistics ==
Appearances and goals by club, season and competition
Club	Season	League			National cup		Other		Total	
Club	Season	Division	Apps	Goals	Apps	Goals	Apps	Goals	Apps	Goals
Southport	1923–24	Third Division North	18	1	4	0	2 (Note: Appearances in Lancashire Senior Cup)	0	24	1
Career total			18	1	4	0	2	0	24	1
