= Joe Quinn (footballer, born 1902) =

Scottish footballer

Charles Joseph Quinn (born 11 March 1902) was a Scottish footballer who played as a full back for Portsmouth as well as non league football for a number of other clubs.
