= George Dent (footballer) =

English footballer (1899–1983)

Personal information
- Full name: George Henry Dent
- Date of birth: 9 March 1899
- Place of birth: Kingston upon Hull, England
- Date of death: 1 September 1983 (aged 84)
- Height: 5 ft 7 in (1.70 m)
- Position: Inside forward

Senior career*
Years	Team	Apps	(Gls)
1921–1922	Clee Rangers		
1922–1923	Humber Graving Dock		
1923–1926	Grimsby Town	24	(12)
1926–1928	Cleethorpes Town		
1928–1929	Mexborough Athletic		
1929–19??	Haycroft Rovers		
- * Club domestic league appearances and goals

George Henry Dent (9 March 1899 – 1 September 1983) was an English professional footballer who played as an inside forward.
