= Thomas Gascoigne (footballer) =

English footballer

Personal information
- Full name: Thomas Clinton Gascoigne
- Date of birth: 4 November 1899
- Place of birth: Scotswood, England
- Date of death: 1991 (aged 91–92)
- Height: 5 ft 9 in (1.75 m)
- Position: Right half

Youth career
- Scotswood

Senior career*
Years	Team	Apps	(Gls)
1921–1924	Leeds United	20	(0)
1924–1926	Doncaster Rovers		
1926–1927	Bradford City	21	(1)
1927	Tranmere Rovers	0	(0)
1930	Hurst		
Total		41+	(1+)
- * Club domestic league appearances and goals

Thomas Clinton Gascoigne (4 November 1899 – 1991) was an English professional footballer who played as a right half.

== Career ==
Born in Scotswood, Gascoigne played for Scotswood, Leeds United, Doncaster Rovers, Bradford City, Tranmere Rovers and Hurst.

For Bradford City he made 21 appearances in the Football League.

== Sources ==
- Frost, Terry (1988). Bradford City A Complete Record 1903-1988. Breedon Books Sport. ISBN 0-907969-38-0.
