= Cyril Hibberd =

English footballer (1895–1980)

Personal information
- Date of birth: 8 May 1895
- Date of death: 1980 (aged 84–85)
- Position: Goalkeeper

Senior career*
Years	Team	Apps	(Gls)
- Chesterfield
- Rochdale
- * Club domestic league appearances and goals

Cyril Maples Hibberd (8 May 1895 – 1980) was an English footballer who played as a goalkeeper for Chesterfield and Rochdale.
