= Noel Edwards =

Welsh footballer (born 1898)

Personal information
- Full name: Joseph Noel Edwards
- Date of birth: 26 November 1898
- Place of birth: Johnstown, Wrexham Wales
- Position: Left back

Senior career*
| Years | Team | Apps | (Gls) |
- Rhos Athletic
| 1921–1926 | Wrexham | 140 | (30) |
| 1926–1927 | Llandudno | | |
| 1927–1928 | Oswestry Town | | |
| 1928–1929 | Holywell United | | |
- * Club domestic league appearances and goals

Joseph Noel Edwards (born 26 November 1898) was a Welsh professional footballer, who played as left back. He made 140 appearances in the English Football League for Wrexham.
