= Bobby Best =

English footballer

Personal information
- Full name: Robert Best
- Date of birth: 12 September 1891
- Place of birth: Mickley, Northumberland, England
- Date of death: 8 June 1947 (aged 55)
- Place of death: Fulwell, Sunderland, England
- Height: 5 ft 5 in (1.65 m)
- Position: Winger

Youth career
- 1910–1911: Mickley Colliery Welfare

Senior career*
Years	Team	Apps	(Gls)
1911–1922	Sunderland	93	(23)
1922–1923	Wolverhampton Wanderers	22	(0)
1923–1924	Durham City	33	(2)
1924–1926	Hartlepools United	72	(8)
1926–1927	Bedlington United		
1927–1928	Robert Thompson's		
1928–19??	West Stanley		
- * Club domestic league appearances and goals

Robert Best (12 September 1891 – 8 June 1947) was an English professional footballer who played as a winger for Sunderland.
