= Edward Watson (footballer) =

English footballer

Personal information
- Full name: Edward Watson
- Date of birth: 27 October 1901
- Place of birth: Sunderland, England
- Date of death: 1986 (aged 84–85)
- Height: 5 ft 9 in (1.75 m)
- Position: Full-back

Senior career*
Years	Team	Apps	(Gls)
1918–1919	Sunderland West End		
1919–1921	Sunderland	1	(0)
1921–1923	Queen`s Park Rangers	8	(0)
1923–1924	Rochdale	1	(0)
1924–1926	Carlisle United		
1926–19??	Sunderland West End		
- * Club domestic league appearances and goals

Edward Watson (27 October 1901 – 1986) was an English professional footballer who played as a full-back for Sunderland.
