= Frank Alford =

English footballer

Personal information
- Full name: Francis John Alford
- Date of birth: 14 May 1901
- Place of birth: Swindon, England
- Date of death: 1982 (aged 80–81)
- Height: 5 ft 6 in (1.68 m)
- Position: Outside left

Senior career*
Years	Team	Apps	(Gls)
?–1919	Swindon Town	?	(?)
1919	Barrow	?	(?)
1919	Darwen	?	(?)
1919–1920	Swindon Town	?	(?)
1920–1921	Barrow	?	(?)
1921–1923	Everton	2	(0)
1923–1925	Barrow	64	(3)
1925–1926	Lincoln City	20	(3)
1926–1927	Scunthorpe & Lindsey United	?	(?)
1927–1931	Northfleet United	?	(?)
1931–1932	Dartford	?	(?)
1932–1934	Sheppey United	?	(?)
1934–1936	Sittingbourne	?	(?)
1936–1937	Ashford	?	(?)
- * Club domestic league appearances and goals

Francis John Alford (14 May 1901 – 1983) was an English professional footballer who played as an Outside left.

He played in The Football League for Everton, Barrow and Lincoln City. Everton paid a fee of £450 to sign Alford from Barrow in 1921.

Additionally Alford played for Southern League club Swindon Town, Darwen and Scunthorpe & Lindsey United of the Midland League and from the 1927–28 season onwards he played initially in the Southern League and then latterly in the Kent League for a selection of Kentish clubs: Northfleet United, Dartford, Sheppey United, Sittingbourne, and Ashford.

Alford played for the Swindon Boys representative team in the 1915 English Schools Football Shield Competition.
