= Frank McKenna (English footballer) =

English footballer

Personal information
- Full name: Francis Charles McKenna
- Date of birth: 9 December 1902
- Place of birth: Walker, Newcastle upon Tyne, England
- Date of death: 1947 (aged 44–45)
- Height: 5 ft 6 in (1.68 m)
- Position: Inside forward

Senior career*
Years	Team	Apps	(Gls)
1919–1920	Swan Hunter		
1920–1921	Spennymoor United		
1921–1922	Wallsend		
1922–1927	Grimsby Town	114	(31)
1927–1928	Fulham	25	(10)
1928–1929	Norwich City	41	(18)
1929–1930	Newport County	24	(4)
1930–1932	Walker Celtic		
1932–1933	Wrexham	7	(4)
1933–193?	Walker Celtic		
- * Club domestic league appearances and goals

Francis Charles McKenna (9 December 1902 – 1947) was an English professional footballer who played as an inside forward.
