= Frank Crowe (footballer) =

English footballer (1895–1951)

Frank Crowe (30 October 1895 – 1951) was an English footballer who played as a wing half for Coventry City, Merthyr Town, Chesterfield and Rochdale.

He was the father of Aston Villa and Wales footballer Vic Crowe. Vic was born in Abercynon while Frank was playing for Merthyr Town.
