= Albert Pearson (footballer) =

English footballer (1892–1975)

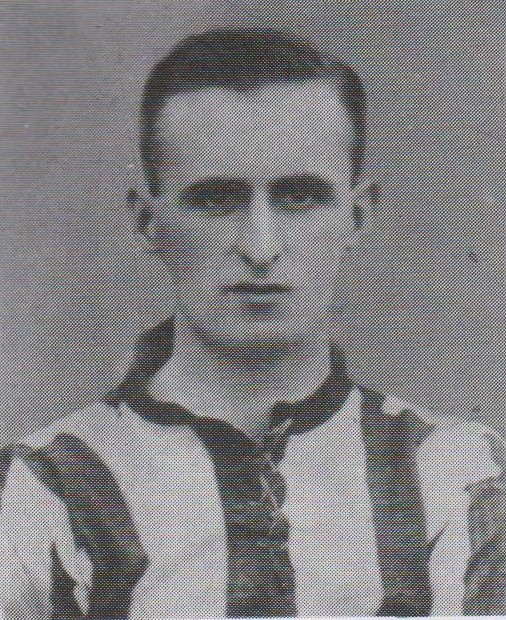

Personal information
- Full name: Albert Victor Pearson
- Date of birth: 2 September 1892
- Place of birth: Tynemouth, England
- Date of death: 24 January 1975 (aged 82)
- Place of death: Newcastle-under-Lyme, England
- Height: 5 ft 9 1/2 in (1.77 m)
- Position: Forward

Youth career
- 1910–1912: Hebburn Argyle

Senior career*
Years	Team	Apps	(Gls)
1912–1914	Sheffield United	6	(0)
1914–1919	Port Vale	31	(14)
1919–1921	Liverpool	44	(4)
1921–1922	Port Vale	19	(1)
1922–1923	Llanelly		
1923–1925	Rochdale	52	(12)
1925–1929	Stockport County	69	(6)
- Ashton National Gas
Total		221+	(37+)
- * Club domestic league appearances and goals

Albert Victor Pearson (6 September 1892 – 24 January 1975) was an English footballer who played as a forward for Sheffield United, Port Vale, Liverpool, Llanelli, Rochdale, Stockport County and Ashton National Gas. His son-in-law, George Heppell, and great-great-grandson, Tom Conlon, also played for Port Vale.

== Career ==
Pearson played for Hebburn Argyle and Sheffield United before joining Port Vale in the summer of 1914. He was a first-team regular during the war years and was a member of the side that won the North Staffordshire Infirmary Cup in 1915. The club went into abeyance due to war concerns during the 1915–16 and 1916–17 seasons, but he continued his first-team duties at the Old Recreation Ground upon the club's re-forming. He was sold to First Division side Liverpool in January 1919; however, Sheffield received some of the fee as they claimed he was still on their books, despite him leaving them five years previous. He missed only nine games in his second season for the "Reds", but fell out of favour at Anfield the next season. He went back to Port Vale in May 1921. He regained his first-team place and played 19 Second Division games before he picked up an injury in February 1922 and was released at the end of the season. He moved on to Llanelli, Rochdale, Stockport County and Ashton National Gas.

== Personal life ==
His son-in-law, George Heppell, played for Port Vale between 1937 and 1952, whilst his great-great-grandson, Tom Conlon, joined the club in 2018.

== Career statistics ==
Appearances and goals by club, season and competition
Club	Season	League			FA Cup		Total	
Club	Season	Division	Apps	Goals	Apps	Goals	Apps	Goals
Sheffield United	1912–13	First Division	5	0	0	0	5	0
Sheffield United	1913–14	First Division	1	0	0	0	1	0
Sheffield United	Total		6	0	0	0	6	0
Port Vale	1914–15	Central League	31	14	3	0	34	14
Liverpool	1919–20	First Division	34	4	5	0	39	4
Liverpool	1920–21	First Division	10	0	3	0	13	0
Liverpool	Total		44	4	8	0	52	4
Port Vale	1921–22	Second Division	19	1	1	0	20	1
Rochdale	1923–24	Third Division North	34	7	2	0	36	7
Rochdale	1924–25	Third Division North	11	3	2	0	13	3
Rochdale	1925–26	Third Division North	7	2	0	0	7	2
Rochdale	Total		52	12	4	0	56	12
Stockport County	1925–26	Second Division	11	2	0	0	11	2
Stockport County	1926–27	Third Division North	25	3	1	0	26	3
Stockport County	1927–28	Third Division North	20	1	2	1	22	2
Stockport County	1928–29	Third Division North	13	0	0	0	13	0
Stockport County	Total		69	6	3	1	72	7
Total			221	37	19	1	240	38

== Honours ==
Port Vale

- North Staffordshire Infirmary Cup: 1915
