= Billy Smith (footballer, born 1900) =

English footballer

Personal information
- Date of birth: 19 November 1900
- Place of birth: Sheffield, England
- Height: 5 ft 8 in (1.73 m)
- Position: Striker

Senior career*
| Years | Team | Apps | (Gls) |
- Hartlepool United
| 1920–1922 | Huddersfield Town | 3 | (0) |
- Rochdale
- * Club domestic league appearances and goals

William E. Smith (born 19 November 1900) was an English professional footballer who played for Hartlepool United, Huddersfield Town and Rochdale. He was born in Sheffield.
