= Jimmy Randall =

English footballer

Personal information
- Full name: James Randall
- Date of birth: 1904
- Place of birth: Ashington, England
- Position: Outside left

Senior career*
Years	Team	Apps	(Gls)
- Ashington
1928–1930	Bradford City	57	(15)
- Derby County
- * Club domestic league appearances and goals

James Randall (born 1904) was an English professional footballer who played as an outside left.

== Career ==
Born Ashington, Randall played for Ashington, Bradford City and Derby County. For Bradford City, he made 57 appearances in the Football League; he also made 6 FA Cup appearances.

== Sources ==
- Frost, Terry (1988). Bradford City A Complete Record 1903-1988. Breedon Books Sport. ISBN 0-907969-38-0.
