= George Jones (footballer, born 1895) =

English footballer

Personal information
- Full name: George Wilfred Jones
- Date of birth: 28 June 1895
- Place of birth: Crook, County Durham, England
- Date of death: 1970 (aged 74–75)
- Position: Winger

Senior career*
Years	Team	Apps	(Gls)
1914–1915	Crook Town		
1915	Gwersyllt		
1919–1923	Everton	36	(2)
1923–1925	Wigan Borough	89	(7)
1925–1926	Middlesbrough	24	(1)
1926–1929	Southport	56	(7)
1929–1930	Yeovil & Petters United		
1930	Great Harwood		
Total		205	(17)
- * Club domestic league appearances and goals

George Wilfred Jones (28 June 1895 – 1970) was an English footballer who played in the Football League for Everton, Middlesbrough, Southport and Wigan Borough.
