= Harry Morris (footballer, born 1900) =

English footballer

Personal information
- Full name: Henry Morris
- Date of birth: 25 August 1900
- Place of birth: Stoke-on-Trent, England
- Date of death: 1964 (aged 63–64)
- Position: Half-back

Senior career*
Years	Team	Apps	(Gls)
1920–1921	Prescot		
1921–1922	Manchester United	0	(0)
1923–1924	Hartlepools United	7	(2)
1924–1925	Wigan Borough	15	(0)
1925–1931	Crewe Alexandra	196	(10)
Total		218	(12)
- * Club domestic league appearances and goals

Henry Morris (25 August 1900 – 1964) was an English footballer who played in the Football League for Crewe Alexandra, Hartlepools United and Wigan Borough.
