= Bob McLean (Scottish footballer) =

Scottish footballer

Personal information
- Date of birth: 9 June 1892
- Place of birth: Glasgow, Scotland
- Date of death: 1970 (aged 77–78)
- Height: 5 ft 7 in (1.70 m)
- Position: Left half

Senior career*
Years	Team	Apps	(Gls)
1920–1922	Alloa Athletic		
1922–1929	Doncaster Rovers	176	(4)
1929–1930	Waterford Celtic		
- * Club domestic league appearances and goals

Robert McLean (9 June 1892 – 1970) was a Scottish footballer, born in Glasgow, who played as a left half for Alloa Athletic and Doncaster Rovers.

After the end of WW1, he played for Alloa Athletic, winning the Scottish Second Division Championship with them in the 1921–22 season. He moved to Doncaster Rovers, then in the Midland League, from Alloa in 1922. He was a constant feature in the line up for his first four seasons, but then his presence tailed off. For a time he wore the skippers armband. In all competitions he made 196 appearances for Doncaster, scoring 4 times.

Following his last game for Doncaster on 16 September 1929 at Halifax Town, he moved to Waterford Celtic, a side in turmoil at the time and who wound up at the end of that season.

Some time later, McClean was appointed trainer and groundsman at Doncaster from the beginning of the 1943−44 season. He died in 1970.

== Honours ==
Alloa Athletic

- Scottish Second Division Championship 1921–22
