= George Nicholls (footballer) =

English footballer (1890–1970)

George James Nicholls (13 December 1890 – 1970) was an English footballer who played as a winger for Southend United and Rochdale.
