= Harry Mallalieu =

English footballer (1896–1981)

Personal information
- Date of birth: 28 August 1896
- Place of birth: Rochdale, England
- Date of death: 1981 (aged 84–85)
- Position: Winger

Senior career*
Years	Team	Apps	(Gls)
1913	Rochdale St Clement's		
1919	All Saints Oakenrod		
1919–1921	Rochdale	3	(0)
1922	Bacup Borough		
1927	Manchester North End		
Total		3	(0)
- * Club domestic league appearances and goals

Harry Mallalieu (28 August 1896 – 1981) was an English footballer who played as a winger for Rochdale when they joined the English Football League in 1921. He scored twice against Arsenal in the first round proper of the 1919–20 F.A. Cup.
