= Billy Oxley =

English footballer

Personal information
- Full name: William Oxley
- Date of birth: 4 December 1899
- Place of birth: Wallsend, Northumberland, England
- Date of death: 29 December 1951 (aged 52)
- Place of death: Wallsend
- Height: 5 ft 10 1/2 in (1.79 m)
- Position: Centre forward

Senior career*
Years	Team	Apps	(Gls)
1923	Percy Main Amateurs		
–	Wallsend Athletic		
1923–	Middlesbrough	0	(0)
–	Walker Celtic		
1924–1925	Rochdale	11	(5)
1925	Manchester City	0	(0)
1925–1926	Southport	11	(1)
1926	Merthyr Town	3	(0)
1926	Northampton Town	3	(1)
1927	Durham City	14	(15)
1927–1928	Wigan Borough	0	(0)
1928	Darlington	1	(1)
192?–1929	Consett		(19)
1929–19??	Carlisle United	1	(0)
–	Blyth Spartans		
- * Club domestic league appearances and goals

William Oxley (4 December 1899 – 29 December 1951) was an English footballer who played as a centre forward in the Football League for Rochdale, Southport, Merthyr Town, Northampton Town, Durham City, Darlington and Carlisle United. He was on the books of Middlesbrough, Manchester City and Wigan Borough, without playing League football for any of them, and also played non-league football for Percy Main Amateurs, Wallsend Athletic, Walker Celtic, Consett and Blyth Spartans.

== Personal life ==
Oxley was born and raised in Wallsend, Northumberland, the son of Edward Oxley, a machine driller in a boiler workshop, and his wife Clara. He was apprenticed as a boilermaker, and enlisted in the Durham Light Infantry towards the end of the First World War. He died in 1951.

Oxley's older brother Dick also played football professionally.

== Football career ==
Oxley played non-league football for Percy Main Amateurs and Wallsend Athletic before joining Second Division club Middlesbrough. He appeared and scored for their North-Eastern League team, but not for the first team, and moved on to Walker Celtic and then Rochdale, with whom he first played in the Football League. He scored five goals from eleven matches in the Third Division North. His first came on his home debut, in September 1924, in which he played a "bustling" game in a 3–1 win against Wrexham, and the remaining four were in the latter part of the season, against Rotherham County, Doncaster Rovers (2), and Tranmere Rovers.

He moved on to Manchester City, but played only for their Central League team, and then signed for Southport in November 1925, where he remained until the end of the season and made eleven appearances in the Third Division North, scoring once. Brief spells with Merthyr Town and Northampton Town, – for whom he scored in a defeat at Queens Park Rangers in the Southern Section – preceded a return to the north-east of England with Durham City, with whom he completed the season in prolific manner. In 14 Third Division matches, Oxley scored 15 goals, including braces against Nelson, New Brighton, Lincoln City, Bradford, and his former club, Southport.

He also scored against Wigan Borough, which may have impressed them, because two weeks after his application to the Football League for a free transfer was successful, he signed for them. Oxley missed the opening of the new season through illness, and never managed to break into Wigan's first team thereafter. He played once and scored once for Darlington in the Third Division, a headed equaliser against Chesterfield in October 1928 that "made amends for previous mistakes", and was granted a free transfer a couple of weeks later.

Consett was his next port of call, for whom he scored 19 North-Eastern League goals before making what proved a brief return to the Football League with Carlisle United in September 1929. He signed for the club, went straight into the starting eleven for that night's match against Wigan, "saw little of the ball and made little use of it when he did get it", Carlisle lost 8–0, and Oxley finished his football career with Blyth Spartans.
