= William Moody (footballer) =

English footballer (1895–1978)

William Arthur Moody (22 February 1895 – 1978) was an English footballer who played as an inside forward for Rochdale.
