= Bob Musgrove =

English footballer

Personal information
- Full name: Robert Musgrove
- Date of birth: 16 August 1893
- Place of birth: Silksworth, England
- Date of death: 5 November 1934 (aged 41)
- Place of death: Silksworth, England
- Position: Wing-half

Senior career*
Years	Team	Apps	(Gls)
1911–1912	Silksworth Colliery		
1912–1915	Barnsley	12	(2)
1919–1920	Durham City		
1920–1921	Leeds United	36	(2)
1921–1924	Durham City	57	(2)
Total		105	(6)
- * Club domestic league appearances and goals

Robert Musgrove (16 August 1893 – 5 November 1934) was an English footballer who played in the Football League for Barnsley, Durham City and Leeds United.

== Personal life ==
Musgrove served in the Durham Light Infantry during the First World War.
