= Alex Christie (footballer, born 1896) =

Scottish footballer

Personal information
- Full name: Alexander Gray Christie
- Date of birth: 27 June 1896
- Place of birth: Glasgow, Scotland
- Date of death: 22 May 1981 (aged 84)
- Place of death: Reading, England
- Height: 5 ft 10 in (1.78 m)
- Position: Half back

Youth career
- Royal Navy Barracks

Senior career*
| Years | Team | Apps | (Gls) |
- Hamilton Academical
| 1919–1921 | Reading | 31 | (1) |
| 1921–1922 | Walsall | 30 | (1) |
| 1922–1924 | Southampton | 5 | (0) |
| 1924–1928 | Rochdale | 137 | (5) |
| 1928–1929 | Exeter City | 4 | (0) |
| 1929–19?? | Aldershot | | |
- * Club domestic league appearances and goals

Alexander Gray Christie (27 June 1896 – 22 May 1981) was a Scottish professional footballer who played as a half back for various clubs in the 1920s, spending most of his career in the Football League Third Division North with Rochdale.

== Football career ==
Christie was born in Glasgow and, after serving in the Royal Navy, started his football career with Hamilton Academicals. In 1919, he moved to England to join Reading, then playing in the Southern League, and remained with them for their first season in the Football League.

In June 1921, he moved to Walsall for a season, before moving to the south coast to join Southampton of the Football League Second Division in May 1922. At The Dell, he was used mainly as cover for Bert Shelley and Alec Campbell. Described as "coolness personified", he made his debut at right half in place of Campbell in a 2–1 victory at Manchester United on 3 March 1923, with Shelley moving to centre half. Christie retained his place for the next two matches before he was dropped in favour of Ted Hough. Although Christie made two further appearances in April, he spent the 1923–24 season on the retained list without any further first-team appearances.

In July 1923, he was transferred to Norwich City where he spent a season in which he made five appearances, before moving on to Rochdale.

At the Spotland Stadium, he became an established first-team player and over four years with Rochdale he made 137 league appearances.

He wound up his career with a season at Exeter City before dropping down to non-league football with Aldershot.
