= Billy Marshall (footballer, born 1898) =

English footballer

Personal information
- Full name: William Edwin Marshall
- Date of birth: 1 October 1898
- Place of birth: Birmingham, England
- Date of death: 14 November 1966 (aged 68)
- Height: 5 ft 8 in (1.73 m)
- Position: Winger

Senior career*
| Years | Team | Apps | (Gls) |
| 1920–1921 | Rotax Works | | |
| 1921–1923 | Chesterfield | 67 | (10) |
| 1923–1932 | Grimsby Town | 340 | (59) |
| 1932–1933 | Reading | 19 | (4) |
| 1933–193? | Boston Town | | |
- * Club domestic league appearances and goals

William Edwin Marshall (1 October 1898 – 14 November 1966) was an English professional footballer who played as a winger.
