= Joe Cooper (footballer, born 1899) =

English footballer

Personal information
- Full name: Joseph Cooper
- Date of birth: 27 January 1899
- Place of birth: Newbold, Derbyshire, England
- Date of death: 22 January 1959 (aged 59)
- Place of death: Cleethorpes, Lincolnshire, England
- Height: 5 ft 10 in (1.78 m)
- Position: Inside forward

Senior career*
Years	Team	Apps	(Gls)
–	Sheepbridge Works		
1919	West Bromwich Albion	0	(0)
–	Saltley College		
1920–1921	Sheffield Wednesday	1	(0)
1921–1923	Chesterfield	53	(14)
1923–1924	Notts County	31	(4)
1924–1932	Grimsby Town	154	(47)
1932–1933	Lincoln City	24	(5)
- * Club domestic league appearances and goals

Joseph Cooper (27 January 1899 – 22 January 1959) was an English footballer who scored 70 goals from 263 appearances in the Football League playing for Sheffield Wednesday, Chesterfield, Notts County, Grimsby Town and Lincoln City. He played non-league football for Sheepbridge Works and Saltley College, and played on trial for West Bromwich Albion. He played as an inside forward.

He joined Notts County from Chesterfield in March 1923 for a £1,000 fee, which was at the time the club's record transfer fee received. During his time with Grimsby Town, Cooper was working as a schoolteacher.
