= William Sandham (footballer) =

English footballer (1898–1963)

William Sandham (30 June 1898 – 1963) was an English footballer who played as an inside forward for Blackburn Rovers and Rochdale. He was joint top goal scorer (with George Guy) for Rochdale in 1922–23.
