= Peter Kelly (footballer, born 1901) =

English footballer

Personal information
- Full name: Peter Kelly
- Date of birth: 20 March 1901
- Place of birth: Tyldesley, England
- Date of death: 1979 (aged 77–78)
- Position: Inside forward

Senior career*
Years	Team	Apps	(Gls)
1920–1921	Tyldesley Celtic		
1921–1924	Chorley		
1924–1926	New Brighton	54	(18)
1926–1929	Notts County	69	(19)
1929–1930	New Brighton	8	(2)
1930–1933	Chorley		
1933	Hindsford		
Total		131	(39)
- * Club domestic league appearances and goals

Peter Kelly (20 March 1901 – 1979) was an English footballer who played in the Football League for New Brighton and Notts County.
