= Harry Peel (footballer) =

English footballer

Personal information
- Full name: Harold Burston Peel
- Date of birth: 26 March 1900
- Place of birth: Bradford, England
- Date of death: 1976 (aged 75–76)
- Height: 5 ft 9 1/2 in (1.77 m)
- Position: Inside forward

Senior career*
Years	Team	Apps	(Gls)
1920–1926	Bradford Park Avenue	207	(37)
1926–1929	Arsenal	52	(6)
1929–1936	Bradford City	186	(26)
Total		445	(69)
- * Club domestic league appearances and goals

Harold Burston Peel (26 March 1900 – 1976) was an English professional footballer who played in the Football League for Bradford Park Avenue, Arsenal and Bradford City.
