= Jack Cawthra =

English footballer (1904–1974)

Jack Cawthra (15 August 1904 – 1974) was an English footballer who played as a goalkeeper for Rochdale. He also played in the reserves teams for Halifax Town and Burnley.
