= Cecil Halkyard =

English footballer (1902–1989)

Cecil Halkyard (17 April 1902 – 1989) was an English footballer who played as a wing half for Rochdale, Reading, Charlton Athletic, and Barrow. He was also on the books of Accrington Stanley and Bury, without playing for the first team.
