= Ed Stirling =

Scottish footballer (1892–?)

Edward Stirling (3 September 1892 – ?) was a Scottish footballer who played as a left half for various clubs including Dundee United and Rochdale.
