= Jimmy Stokoe =

English footballer (1888–1970)

Personal information
- Full name: James Stokoe
- Date of birth: 12 July 1888
- Place of birth: Shiremoor, England
- Date of death: 1970 (aged 81–82)
- Position: Winger

Senior career*
Years	Team	Apps	(Gls)
1909–1910	Jarrow Croft		
1910–1919	Hartlepools United		
1919–1920	Palmer's (Jarrow)		
1920–1922	Swindon Town	18	(7)
1922–1923	Derby County	8	(1)
1923–1928	Durham City	151	(17)
1928	Spen Black & White		
1929	Mickley		
Total		177	(25)
- * Club domestic league appearances and goals

James Stokoe (12 July 1888 – 1970) was an English footballer who played in the Football League for Derby County, Durham City and Swindon Town.
