= Bobby Willis (footballer) =

English footballer (1901–1974)

Robert Smith Willis (31 January 1901 – 1974) was an English footballer who played as a wing half for Rochdale and Halifax Town.
