= Dai Hopkins (footballer, born 1902) =

Welsh footballer

Arthur David Hopkins (23 August 1902 – 1943) was a Welsh footballer who played as a full back for Rochdale.
