= Bill Prouse =

English footballer (1900–1984)

Personal information
- Full name: William Horatio Redvers Prouse
- Date of birth: 1900
- Place of birth: Birmingham
- Date of death: 1984 (aged 83–84)
- Height: 6 ft 0 in (1.83 m)
- Position: Inside forward

Senior career*
Years	Team	Apps	(Gls)
1919	Plymouth Argyle		
1920	Redditch Town		
1922	Dogpool		
1922-1924	Rochdale	51	(18)
1924-1927	Fulham	76	(31)
1927	Wellington Town		
1929	Cradley Heath		
1930	Wellington St George's		
1930	Bilston United		
Total		127	(49)
- * Club domestic league appearances and goals

William Horatio Redvers Prouse (1900-1984) was an English footballer who played as an inside forward for Rochdale and Fulham.

== Career statistics ==
Club	Season	League			FA Cup		Total	
Club	Season	Division	Apps	Goals	Apps	Goals	Apps	Goals
Rochdale	1922–23	Third Division North	11	4	0	0	11	4
Rochdale	1923–24	Third Division North	40	14	1	0	41	14
Fulham	1924–25	Second Division	33	16	2	0	35	16
Fulham	1925–26	Second Division	24	8	3	1	27	9
Fulham	1926–27	Second Division	19	7	2	0	21	7
Career total			127	49	8	1	135	50
