= Jimmy Nuttall =

English footballer

Personal information
- Date of birth: 7 April 1899
- Place of birth: Bolton, England
- Date of death: 1945 (aged 45–46)
- Position: Full-back

Senior career*
Years	Team	Apps	(Gls)
1910–1911	Manchester United	0	(0)
1916	Bolton Wanderers		
1918	Rochdale		
1919–1920	Manchester United	0	(0)
1921–1923	Rochdale	59	(0)
1924	Leyland		
1925	Chorley		
- * Club domestic league appearances and goals

James Nuttall (7 July 1899 – 1945) was an English footballer who played for Manchester United and Bolton Wanderers and was later captain of Rochdale when they joined the English Football League in 1921.
