= Norman Whitfield (footballer) =

English footballer

Personal information
- Date of birth: 3 April 1896
- Place of birth: West Wylam, England
- Date of death: 14 November 1962 (aged 66)
- Place of death: Leicester, England
- Height: 5 ft 8 1/2 in (1.74 m)
- Position: Inside left

Youth career
- Prudhoe Celtic Juniors
- Jarrow Croft

Senior career*
Years	Team	Apps	(Gls)
1913–1920	Leicester City	24	(6)
1920–1922	Hednesford Town	68	(66)
1922–1927	Chesterfield	120	(60)
- Worcester City
1928–1930	Nuneaton Town		(47)
- Hinckley United
- * Club domestic league appearances and goals

Norman Whitfield (3 April 1896 – 14 November 1962) was an English professional footballer who played as an inside left in the Football League for Chesterfield and Leicester City. He later captained Nuneaton Town in non-League football.

== Personal life ==
Whitfield served as a gunner in the Royal Garrison Artillery during the First World War and was wounded during the course of his service.

== Career statistics ==
Appearances and goals by club, season and competition
Club	Season	League			FA Cup		Total	
Club	Season	Division	Apps	Goals	Apps	Goals	Apps	Goals
Leicester City	1913–14	Second Division	4	1	0	0	4	1
Leicester City	1914–15	Second Division	12	3	0	0	12	3
Leicester City	1919–20	Second Division	8	2	0	0	8	2
Leicester City	Total		24	6	0	0	24	6
Hednesford Town	1920–21	Birmingham and District League	34	27	0	0	34	27
Hednesford Town	1921–22	Birmingham and District League	34	39	0	0	34	39
Hednesford Town	Total		68	66	0	0	68	66
Chesterfield	1922–23	Third Division North	33	13	4	2	37	15
Chesterfield	1923–24	Third Division North	34	18	3	2	37	20
Chesterfield	1924–25	Third Division North	20	11	0	0	20	11
Chesterfield	1925–26	Third Division North	31	17	3	2	34	19
Chesterfield	1926–27	Third Division North	2	1	1	0	3	1
Chesterfield	Total		120	60	11	6	131	66
Career total			212	132	11	6	223	138

== Honours ==
Nuneaton Town

- Tamworth Charity Cup: 1928–29, 1929–30
- Nuneaton Hospitals Cup: 1928–29
- Nuneaton Charity Cup: 1928–29, 1929–30
- Chapel End Nursing Cup: 1929–30
- Atherstone Nursing Cup: 1929–30
