= Harry Moody (footballer) =

English footballer

Personal information
- Full name: James Henry Moody
- Date of birth: 12 March 1896
- Place of birth: Rochdale, England
- Date of death: 21 February 1968 (aged 71)
- Height: 5 ft 9 in (1.75 m)
- Position: Goalkeeper

Senior career*
Years	Team	Apps	(Gls)
1919	Rochdale		
1919–1920	Mid-Rhondda		
1920–1922	Grimsby Town	32	(0)
1922–1928	Rochdale	161	(0)
Total		193	(0)
- * Club domestic league appearances and goals

James Henry Moody (12 March 1896 – 21 February 1968) was an English professional footballer who played as a goalkeeper for Grimsby Town and Rochdale. His playing career came to an abrupt end in January 1928 after he suffered a head injury whilst playing for Rochdale against Stockport County.
