= Joe Campbell (footballer, born 1894) =

English footballer

Personal information
- Full name: Joseph Campbell
- Date of birth: 13 April 1904
- Place of birth: Blackburn
- Date of death: 1976 (aged 71–72)
- Position: Winger

Senior career*
| Years | Team | Apps | (Gls) |
| 1919 | Heywood United | | |
| 1920-1921 | Oldham Athletic | 0 | (0) |
| 1921-1922 | Wigan Borough | 7 | (0) |
| 1922 | Blackburn Rovers | 0 | (0) |
| 1922-1927 | Rochdale | 34 | (4) |
| 1927 | Stalybridge Celtic | | |
| 1928 | Morecambe | | |
| 1929 | Great Harwood | | |
| Total | | 41 | (4) |
- * Club domestic league appearances and goals

Joseph Campbell (13 April 1894 – 1976) was an English footballer who played as a winger for Wigan Borough and Rochdale.
