= 1921–22 Rochdale A.F.C. season =

English football club season

Rochdale
1921–22 season
- Chairman: JG Ramsbottom
- Manager: Tom Wilson
- Stadium: Spotland Stadium
- Football League Third Division North: 20th
- FA Cup: 5th round qualifying
- Top goalscorer: League: Harry Dennison (17); All: Harry Dennison (18)
Home colours

The 1921–22 season was Rochdale's 15th in existence, where they competed in the newly formed Football League Third Division North, finishing in 20th and last position with 26 points. They entered the FA Cup at the 5th qualifying round without progressing any further.

== Squad Statistics ==
=== Appearances and goals ===
No.	Pos	Nat	Player	Total		Division3 (N)		FA Cup	
No.	Pos	Nat	Player	Apps	Goals	Apps	Goals	Apps	Goals
N/A	GK	(England) ENG	Jimmy Crabtree	35	0	34	0	1	0
N/A	DF	(England) ENG	Jimmy Nuttall	30	0	30	0	0	0
N/A	DF	(England) ENG	Joe Sheehan	1	0	1	0	0	0
N/A	FW	(England) ENG	Jack Hill	26	8	25	8	1	0
N/A	DF	(England) ENG	Peter Farrar	12	0	12	0	0	0
N/A	DF	(England) ENG	Jack Yarwood	12	0	11	0	1	0
N/A	FW	(England) ENG	Sid Hoad	18	2	17	2	1	0
N/A	FW	(England) ENG	Bob Sandiford	12	2	12	2	0	0
N/A	FW	(England) ENG	Harry Dennison	34	18	33	17	1	1
N/A	FW	(England) ENG	Reg Owens	14	7	14	7	0	0
N/A	FW	(England) ENG	Gene Carney	10	6	10	6	0	0
N/A	FW	(England) ENG	Arthur Collinge	10	1	10	1	0	0
N/A	DF	(England) ENG	Tommy Mort	29	0	28	0	1	0
N/A	DF	(England) ENG	Joseph Barnes	3	0	3	0	0	0
N/A	DF	(England) ENG	Herbert Clark	1	0	1	0	0	0
N/A	MF	(England) ENG	John Broster	1	0	1	0	0	0
N/A	FW	(England) ENG	Albert Wolstencroft	1	0	1	0	0	0
N/A	MF	(England) ENG	Ernie Whiteside	3	0	3	0	0	0
N/A	MF	(England) ENG	Harry Mallalieu	3	0	3	0	0	0
N/A	GK	(England) ENG	William Sneyd	4	0	4	0	0	0
N/A	MF	(England) ENG	Jim Tully	32	0	31	0	1	0
N/A	MF	(England) ENG	Joe Herbert	17	4	16	4	1	0
N/A	DF	(England) ENG	Jack Barton	20	0	19	0	1	0
N/A	DF	(England) ENG	Fred Taylor	19	0	19	0	0	0
N/A	MF	(England) ENG	William Clifton	13	0	13	0	0	0
N/A	DF	(Scotland) SCO	Jock Burns	15	0	15	0	0	0
N/A	FW	(England) ENG	Tommy Bennett	4	1	3	0	1	1
N/A	MF	(England) ENG	George Daniels	27	1	26	1	1	0
N/A	FW	(Scotland) SCO	Hugh Cameron	11	2	11	2	0	0
N/A	FW	(England) ENG	George Hoyle	3	1	3	1	0	0
N/A	FW	(Scotland) SCO	Wilson McGhee	2	0	2	0	0	0
N/A	DF	(England) ENG	Thomas Catlow	1	0	1	0	0	0
N/A	MF	(England) ENG	Harry Foster	2	0	2	0	0	0
N/A	MF	(England) ENG	Arthur Hinchliffe	4	0	4	0	0	0

Squad Statistics (Non-competitive)

=== Appearances and goals (non-competitive) ===
No.	Pos	Nat	Player	Total		Lancashire Cup		Manchester Cup	
No.	Pos	Nat	Player	Apps	Goals	Apps	Goals	Apps	Goals
N/A	GK	(England) ENG	Jimmy Crabtree	2	0	1	0	1	0
N/A	DF	(England) ENG	Jimmy Nuttall	2	0	1	0	1	0
N/A	DF	(England) ENG	Joe Sheehan	0	0	0	0	0	0
N/A	FW	(England) ENG	Jack Hill	2	0	1	0	1	0
N/A	DF	(England) ENG	Peter Farrar	0	0	0	0	0	0
N/A	DF	(England) ENG	Jack Yarwood	2	0	1	0	1	0
N/A	FW	(England) ENG	Sid Hoad	1	0	1	0	0	0
N/A	FW	(England) ENG	Bob Sandiford	0	0	0	0	0	0
N/A	FW	(England) ENG	Harry Dennison	1	0	0	0	1	0
N/A	FW	(England) ENG	Reg Owens	1	0	1	0	0	0
N/A	FW	(England) ENG	Gene Carney	1	0	1	0	0	0
N/A	FW	(England) ENG	Arthur Collinge	1	0	1	0	0	0
N/A	DF	(England) ENG	Tommy Mort	1	0	0	0	1	0
N/A	DF	(England) ENG	Joseph Barnes	0	0	0	0	0	0
N/A	DF	(England) ENG	Herbert Clark	1	0	1	0	0	0
N/A	MF	(England) ENG	John Broster	1	0	1	0	0	0
N/A	FW	(England) ENG	Albert Wolstencroft	1	0	1	0	0	0
N/A	MF	(England) ENG	Ernie Whiteside	0	0	0	0	0	0
N/A	MF	(England) ENG	Harry Mallalieu	0	0	0	0	0	0
N/A	GK	(England) ENG	William Sneyd	0	0	0	0	0	0
N/A	MF	(England) ENG	Jim Tully	0	0	0	0	0	0
N/A	MF	(England) ENG	Joe Herbert	0	0	0	0	0	0
N/A	DF	(England) ENG	Jack Barton	0	0	0	0	0	0
N/A	DF	(England) ENG	Fred Taylor	1	0	0	0	1	0
N/A	MF	(England) ENG	William Clifton	1	0	0	0	1	0
N/A	DF	(Scotland) SCO	Jock Burns	0	0	0	0	0	0
N/A	FW	(England) ENG	Tommy Bennett	0	0	0	0	0	0
N/A	MF	(England) ENG	George Daniels	1	0	0	0	1	0
N/A	FW	(Scotland) SCO	Hugh Cameron	1	0	0	0	1	0
N/A	FW	(England) ENG	George Hoyle	1	1	0	0	1	1
N/A	FW	(Scotland) SCO	Wilson McGhee	0	0	0	0	0	0
N/A	DF	(England) ENG	Thomas Catlow	0	0	0	0	0	0
N/A	MF	(England) ENG	Harry Foster	0	0	0	0	0	0
N/A	MF	(England) ENG	Arthur Hinchliffe	0	0	0	0	0	0

== Final league table ==
Pos	Team	Pld	W	D	L	GF	GA	GAv	Pts	Qualification or relegation
16	Nelson	38	13	7	18	48	66	0.727	33	
17	Wigan Borough	38	11	9	18	46	72	0.639	31	
18	Tranmere Rovers	38	9	11	18	51	61	0.836	29	
19	Halifax Town	38	10	9	19	56	76	0.737	29	Re-elected
20	Rochdale	38	11	4	23	52	77	0.675	26	Re-elected

Source: rsssf.com

== Competitions ==
=== Football League Third Division North ===
==== Results by matchday ====
Matchday	1	2	3	4	5	6	7	8	9	10	11	12	13	14	15	16	17	18	19	20	21	22	23	24	25	26	27	28	29	30	31	32	33	34	35	36	37	38
Ground	H	A	H	A	H	A	H	A	H	A	H	A	H	A	A	H	A	H	A	H	A	H	H	A	A	H	H	A	H	A	H	A	H	H	A	A	H	A
Result	W	L	D	D	L	L	W	L	L	L	W	L	L	L	L	W	L	W	L	L	L	L	L	W	L	W	L	L	W	W	W	D	W	D	L	L	L	L
Position	8	11	13	11	15	17	13	13	16	18	15	17	17	18	18	17	17	17	18	20	20	20	20	20	20	20	20	20	20	20	19	19	18	18	19	20	20	20

Source: https://www.enfa.com
A = Away; H = Home; W = Win; D = Draw; L = Loss

27 August 1921 1	Rochdale	6–3	Accrington Stanley	Rochdale
	Owens; Dennison; Carney (pen.)	Report	Hosker; Green	Stadium: Spotland Stadium; Attendance: 7,000

3 September 1921 2	Accrington Stanley	4–0	Rochdale	Accrington
	Hosker; Green; Makin	Report		Stadium: Peel Park; Attendance: 11,000

10 September 1921 3	Rochdale	3–3	Halifax Town	Rochdale
	Hill; Dennison; Carney (pen.)	Report	Woods; Hetherington	Stadium: Spotland Stadium; Attendance: 8,000

17 September 1921 4	Halifax Town	1–1	Rochdale	Halifax
	Challinor	Report	Collinge	Stadium: The Shay; Attendance: 10,000

24 September 1921 5	Rochdale	0–1	Southport	Rochdale
		Report	Wray	Stadium: Spotland Stadium; Attendance: 6,000

1 October 1921 6	Southport	2–1	Rochdale	Southport
	Rigsby; Glover	Report	Sandiford	Stadium: Haig Avenue; Attendance: 6,000

8 October 1921 7	Rochdale	2–1	Tranmere Rovers	Rochdale
	Herbert	Report	Bullough	Stadium: Spotland Stadium; Attendance: 5,000

15 October 1921 8	Tranmere Rovers	7–0	Rochdale	Birkenhead
	Groves; Bullough; Cunningham	Report		Stadium: Prenton Park; Attendance: 6,000

22 October 1921 9	Rochdale	0–1	Stockport County	Rochdale
	Nuttall (red card)	Report	Reid	Stadium: Spotland Stadium; Attendance: 3,000

29 October 1921 10	Stockport County	3–0	Rochdale	Stockport
	Jones; Gault	Report	Burns (red card)	Stadium: Edgeley Park; Attendance: 10,000

5 November 1921 11	Rochdale	2–1	Stalybridge Celtic	Rochdale
	Hoad 15', 47' (pen.)	Report	Gee 60'	Stadium: Spotland Stadium; Attendance: 5,000; Referee: W.G. Day

12 November 1921 12	Stalybridge Celtic	1–0	Rochdale	Stalybridge
	Petrie 2'	Report		Stadium: Bower Fold; Attendance: 6,000; Referee: W.G. Day

19 November 1921 13	Rochdale	0–2	Grimsby Town	Rochdale
		Report	Smith; Carmichael	Stadium: Spotland Stadium; Attendance: 5,000

26 November 1921 14	Grimsby Town	3–0	Rochdale	Cleethorpes
	Miller; Carmichael	Report		Stadium: Blundell Park; Attendance: 8,000

10 December 1921 15	Wigan Borough	3–2	Rochdale	Wigan
	Brodie; Broster; Freeman	Report	Dennison (pen.)	Stadium: Springfield Park; Attendance: 5,000

24 December 1921 16	Rochdale	7–0	Walsall	Rochdale
	Owens; Dennison (pen.) (pen.); Daniels; Cameron	Report		Stadium: Spotland Stadium; Attendance: 5,000

26 December 1921 17	Crewe Alexandra	2–0	Rochdale	Crewe
	Davies; Caulfield	Report		Stadium: Gresty Road

27 December 1921 18	Rochdale	2–0	Crewe Alexandra	Rochdale
	Dennison	Report		Stadium: Spotland Stadium

31 December 1921 19	Hartlepool United	5–3	Rochdale	Hartlepool
	Hardy; Parkinson; Robertson	Report	Sandiford; Owens; Herbert	Stadium: Victoria Park; Attendance: 7,000

14 January 1922 20	Rochdale	0–1	Hartlepool United	Rochdale
		Report	Robertson	Stadium: Spotland Stadium

21 January 1922 21	Darlington	2–1	Rochdale	Darlington
	Wolstenholme; Healey	Report	Herbert	Stadium: Feethams; Attendance: 2,000

28 January 1922 22	Rochdale	0–2	Darlington	Rochdale
		Report	Malcolm; Wolstenholme	Stadium: Spotland Stadium; Attendance: 4,000

4 February 1922 23	Rochdale	0–2	Lincoln City	Rochdale
		Report	Lees 42'; Walker 86'	Stadium: Spotland Stadium

11 February 1922 24	Lincoln City	1–2	Rochdale	Lincoln
	Rippon 44'; Fenwick (red card)	Report	Greaves 52' (o.g.); Dennison 82'	Stadium: Sincil Bank

18 February 1922 25	Ashington	7–3	Rochdale	Ashington
	Galloway; Foster; Barber; Robertson	Report	Dennison; Carney	Stadium: Portland Park; Attendance: 3,000

25 February 1922 26	Rochdale	2–1	Ashington	Rochdale
	Dennison; Hoyle	Report	Robertson	Stadium: Spotland Stadium; Attendance: 3,000

4 March 1922 27	Rochdale	0–1	Barrow	Rochdale
		Report	Sharkey	Stadium: Spotland Stadium; Attendance: 3,000

11 March 1922 28	Barrow	1–0	Rochdale	Barrow-in-Furness
	Sharkey	Report		Stadium: Holker Street; Attendance: 5,250

18 March 1922 29	Rochdale	1–0	Durham City	Rochdale
	Dennison	Report		Stadium: Spotland Stadium; Attendance: 4,000

25 March 1922 30	Durham City	0–2	Rochdale	Durham
		Report	Hill	Stadium: Kepier Haughs; Attendance: 1,500

1 April 1922 31	Rochdale	3–0	Wrexham	Rochdale
	Hill; Carney	Report		Stadium: Spotland Stadium; Attendance: 4,000

8 April 1922 32	Wrexham	1–1	Rochdale	Wrexham
	Matthias (pen.)	Report	Hill	Stadium: Racecourse Ground; Attendance: 3,000

14 April 1922 33	Rochdale	4–2	Wigan Borough	Rochdale
	Carney; Dennison; Hill	Report	Freeman	Stadium: Spotland Stadium; Attendance: 3,000

15 April 1922 34	Rochdale	2–2	Nelson	Rochdale
	Dennison	Report	Eddleston; Wilson	Stadium: Spotland Stadium; Attendance: 3,000

18 April 1922 35	Walsall	4–0	Rochdale	Walsall
	Reid; Butler; Harper; Groves	Report		Stadium: Fellows Park; Attendance: 5,000

22 April 1922 36	Nelson	4–1	Rochdale	Nelson
	Eddleston; Wilson	Report	Hill	Stadium: Seedhill Football Ground

29 April 1922 37	Rochdale	0–1	Chesterfield	Rochdale
		Report	Williams	Stadium: Spotland Stadium; Attendance: 3,000

6 May 1922 38	Chesterfield	2–1	Rochdale	Chesterfield
	Cooper; Sykes	Report	Cameron	Stadium: Saltergate Recreation Ground; Attendance: 6,000

=== FA Cup ===
3 December 1921 Q5	Nelson	3–2	Rochdale	Nelson
	Eddleston; Waller; Lilley		Dennison; Bennett	Stadium: Seedhill; Attendance: 6,000

=== Lancashire Senior Cup ===
14 September 1921 1	Stockport County	2–0	Rochdale	Stockport
	Goal			Stadium: Edgeley Park; Attendance: 2,000

=== Manchester Cup ===
28 February 1922	Bolton Wanderers	2–1	Rochdale	Bolton
	Goal		Hoyle	Stadium: Burnden Park; Attendance: 3,000
