= List of Rochdale A.F.C. players (1–24 appearances) =

Appearances and goals are for first-team competitive matches only. Wartime matches are regarded as unofficial and are excluded, as are matches from the abandoned 1939–40 season.

Players with fewer than 25 competitive appearances for Rochdale A.F.C.
Name	Nationality	Position	Club career	League apps	League goals	Total apps	Total goals	Notes
George Joy	Unknown	DF	1908	3	0	3	0	.
W. Kelly	Unknown	DF	1908	0	0	1	0	
H. Parkinson	Unknown	MF	1908	3	0	3	0	
Joe Bowden	Unknown	MF	1908	0	0	1	0	
Joe Hardman	Unknown	FW	1908	3	0	4	0	
Charles Donaghy	England	FW	1908	12	4	12	4	
J. Wilcock	Unknown	MF	1908	2	0	2	0	
H. Plant	Unknown	FW	1908–1909	21	0	22	1	
Charles Mitchell	England	FW	1908–1909	17	4	18	4	
R. Barlow	Unknown	MF	1908–1909	16	4	16	4	
Thomas Thornley	Unknown	MF	1908–1909	13	2	14	2	
Harold Meadowcroft	England	MF	1908–1909	6	0	7	1	
E. Petty	Unknown	DF	1908–1909	9	0	10	0	
Frank Pearson	England	FW	1908–1909	11	6	11	6	
W. Buckley	Unknown	DF	1908–1909	3	0	4	0	
Billy Hampson	England	DF	1908–1909	22	1	22	1	
R. Lawton	Unknown	GK	1908–1909	4	0	4	0	
Bob Heap	England	MF	1908–1909	17	8	17	8	
Harry Wilkinson	England	FW	1909	2	0	2	0	
Harry McWilliams	Unknown	MF	1909	3	0	3	0	
F. Mulrooney	Unknown	FW	1909	17	2	17	2	
C. McCormack	Unknown	MF	1909	4	0	4	0	
Robert Cuthbertson	Unknown	MF	1909	2	0	2	0	
H. Barnes	Unknown	FW	1909	15	6	17	8	
Levi Hennifer	Unknown	MF	1909	1	0	1	0	
J. Walmesley	Unknown	MF	1909	2	0	2	0	
E. Stansfield	Unknown	MF	1909	2	0	2	0	
Ernie McShea	Scotland	FW	1909	3	0	3	0	
W. Wright	Unknown	MF	1909	1	0	1	0	
J. Robinson	Unknown	DF	1909	2	0	3	0	
Matthews	Unknown	DF	1909	3	0	3	0	
J.H. Jones	Unknown	FW	1909–1910	10	7	11	7	
Frank Baker	Unknown	FW	1909–1910	24	13	24	13	
F. Greenhalgh	Unknown	MF	1909–1911	9	0	13	0	
Mills	Unknown	FW	1910	1	0	1	0	
Joseph Thorpe	Unknown	MF	1910	9	0	9	0	
John Carthy	Unknown	FW	1910	9	3	9	3	
G. Harrison	Unknown	FW	1910	6	4	6	4	
Reeves	Unknown	GK	1910	2	0	2	0	
Percy Hartley	England	MF	1910	6	0	8	0	
Norman Riddell	England	DF	1910–1911	15	1	22	1	
Ernest Cutts	Unknown	MF	1911	5	1	5	1	
Harry Moon	Unknown	FW	1911	2	1	2	1	
Eversley Mansfield	England	FW	1911	2	0	2	0	
Marcroft	Unknown	FW	1911	1	0	1	0	
Frank Spriggs	England	FW	1911	4	2	4	2	
Bob Peake	Unknown	FW	1911	2	1	2	1	
James McKenzie	Unknown	DF	1911	1	0	1	0	
Lawrence Kenyon	Unknown	MF	1911	1	0	1	0	
Hall	Unknown	FW	1911	4	0	4	0	
James Stamford	Unknown	FW	1911	2	1	2	1	
J Costelli	Unknown	DF	1911	1	0	1	0	
Arthur Campey	Unknown	DF	1911	1	0	1	0	
W.H. Martin	Unknown	MF	1912	1	0	1	0	
Howarth	Unknown	MF	1912	1	0	1	0	
Jack Page	England	DF	1912	13	0	16	0	
Bernard Tattum	Unknown	FW	1912	5	0	5	0	
Baker/Barker	Unknown	FW	1912	1	0	1	0	
H. Clouston	Unknown	FW	1912	4	1	4	1	
Tommy Leigh	England	DF	1912–1913	7	0	7	0	
D. McKinley	Unknown	MF	1912–1913	8	4	9	4	
W.W. Turnbull	Unknown	FW	1912–1913	5	0	5	0	
James Morris	Unknown	GK	1912–1913	7	0	7	0	
Dan Cunliffe	England	FW	1912–1913	11	2	13	2	
J. Goodwin	Unknown	DF	1912–1913	11	0	13	0	
W. Davies	Unknown	MF	1912–1913	4	1	4	1	
Percy Hardy	Unknown	MF	1913	2	0	2	0	
J. Crabtree	Unknown	DF	1913	8	0	9	0	
H.J. Coates	Unknown	MF	1913	2	0	2	0	
D.H. Clark	Unknown	MF	1913	2	1	2	1	
W. Chamberlain	Unknown	DF	1913	16	0	17	0	
Bob Watson	England	FW	1913–1914	18	4	19	4	
Jack Marshall	England	MF	1913–1914	9	0	9	0	
Billy Bamford	Unknown	DF	1913–1914 1920	7	0	7	0	
Vince Hayes	England	DF	1913–1915	7	1	7	1	
George Spoor	Unknown	DF	1914	1	0	1	0	
J. Taylor	Unknown	DF	1914	1	0	1	0	
Fred Heap	England	FW	1914	1	0	1	0	
J. Tattersall	Unknown	MF	1914–1915	6	1	6	1	
Bob Lilley	England	DF	1914–1915	14	0	16	0	
W.S. Anderson	Unknown	MF	1914–1915	15	1	15	1	
W. Plumley	Unknown	GK	1914–1919	8	0	8	0	
P. Pickup	Unknown	MF	1914–1919	6	0	6	0	
Towers	Unknown	MF	1915	1	0	1	0	
Haynes	Unknown	FW	1915	4	1	4	1	
T. Southworth	Unknown	MF	1915	4	1	4	1	
B. Holt	Unknown	GK	1915	1	0	1	0	
Alfred Caldwell	Unknown	DF	1915	6	0	6	0	
John Swann	Unknown	GK	1915	6	0	6	0	
H. Fletcher	Unknown	FW	1915	1	0	1	0	
Tweedale Rigg	England	MF	1915 1924–1925	3	0	3	0	
T. Berry	Unknown	GK	1919	6	0	6	0	
J. Stott	Unknown	GK	1919	10	0	10	0	
Frank Sheldon	England	MF	1919	2	0	2	0	
George Horridge	Unknown	FW	1919	7	2	10	2	
H. Anderson	Unknown	DF	1919	2	0	2	0	
J. Higgins	Unknown	DF	1919	2	0	2	0	
Dixon	Unknown	DF	1919	1	0	1	0	
Frank Herring	Unknown	MF	1919	2	0	2	0	
W. Greenhalgh	Unknown	MF	1919	4	0	4	0	
J. Cooper	Unknown	MF	1919	11	4	11	4	
Wilkinson	Unknown	MF	1919	1	0	1	0	
R. Brindle	Unknown	MF	1919	3	0	3	0	
Willie Page	England	FW	1919	1	0	1	0	
John Lee	England	MF	1919	1	0	1	0	
H. Challinor	Unknown	MF	1919	1	0	2	0	
R. Bellis	Unknown	FW	1919	1	0	1	0	
A. Brown	Unknown	FW	1919	2	0	2	0	
T. Smith	Unknown	FW	1919	2	0	2	0	
W.H. Oliver	Unknown	FW	1919	1	0	1	0	
H. Butterworth	Unknown	MF	1919	2	0	2	0	
P.G. Jephcott	Unknown	FW	1919	1	0	1	0	
A. Newman	Unknown	FW	1919	1	0	1	0	
Davie Ross	England	FW	1919	2	0	2	0	
W. Hales	Unknown	FW	1919	1	0	1	0	
J. Taylor	Unknown	DF	1919–1920	5	0	5	0	
A. Eccles	Unknown	MF	1919–1920	9	2	9	2	
Tattersall	Unknown	MF	1919–1920	3	0	3	0	
T.A. Parry	Unknown	MF	1919–1920	7	3	7	3	
L. Kenyon	Unknown	MF	1919–1920	4	0	4	0	
Turner	Unknown	MF	1919–1920	5	0	5	0	
James Mills	England	FW	1919–1920	19	7	20	7	
Tom Makin	Unknown	FW	1919–1920	10	0	10	0	
Tom Bamford	England	DF	1920	4	0	4	0	
W. Taylor	Unknown	MF	1920	4	0	4	0	
Wolfe	Unknown	MF	1920	2	0	2	0	
J.C. Cam	Unknown	MF	1920	2	0	2	0	
Farnworth	Unknown	MF	1920	1	0	1	0	
Butterworth	Unknown	FW	1920	1	1	1	1	
F. Stott	Unknown	FW	1920	1	0	1	0	
W. Bradshaw	Unknown	MF	1920	5	0	5	0	
F. Braithwaite	Unknown	FW	1920	1	0	1	0	
Tom Byrom	England	FW	1920	18	9	22	10	
H. Thorpe	Unknown	GK	1920–1921	6	0	6	0	
W. Ward	Unknown	FW	1920–1921	10	1	10	1	
Tom McDonald	Unknown	GK	1920–1921	4	0	4	0	
J. Taylor	Unknown	DF	1920–1921	5	0	5	0	
Joe Wilson	England	DF	1920–1921	19	1	24	1	
Tom Wilson	Unknown	MF	1920–1921	2	0	2	0	
E. Lowe	Unknown	FW	1920–1921	18	9	23	11	
L. Turner	Unknown	FW	1920–1921	4	0	5	0	
E. Tansey	Unknown	FW	1921	2	0	2	0	
Joseph Barnes	England	DF	1921	10	0	10	0	
Tom Nuttall	England	DF	1921	1	0	1	0	
Bert Thornley	Unknown	FW	1921	2	0	2	0	
Lund/Lunn	Unknown	GK	1921	1	0	1	0	
Clutton	Unknown	FW	1921	1	0	1	0	
Stansfield	Unknown	GK	1921	1	0	1	0	
Bussey/Bussy	Unknown	FW	1921	1	0	1	0	
Joe Herbert	England	MF	1921–1922	24	8	24	8	
Arthur Collinge	England	FW	1921–1922	23	3	23	3	
Bob Sandiford	England	FW	1921–1925	23	5	23	5	
Joe Sheehan	England	DF	1921	1	0	1	0	
Herbert Clark	England	DF	1921	1	0	1	0	
Albert Wolstencroft	England	FW	1921	1	0	1	0	
Thomas Catlow	England	MF	1921	1	0	1	0	
Wilson McGhee	Scotland	MF	1921	2	0	2	0	
Ernie Whiteside	England	MF	1921	3	0	3	0	
William Sneyd	England	GK	1921–1922	4	0	4	0	
Tommy Bennett	England	FW	1921	3	0	4	1	
Gene Carney	England	FW	1921–1922	10	6	10	6	
Hugh Cameron	Scotland	FW	1921–1922	11	2	11	2	
Peter Farrar	England	DF	1921–1922	12	0	12	0	
William Clifton	England	MF	1921–1922	13	0	13	0	
Reg Owens	England	FW	1921–1922	14	7	14	7	First hat-trick scorer for Rochdale in the football league
Jock Burns	Scotland	DF	1921–1922	15	0	15	0	
Fred Taylor	England	MF	1921–1922	19	0	19	0	
William Moody	England	FW	1922	1	0	1	0	
Harry Foster	England	MF	1922	2	0	2	0	
George Hoyle	England	FW	1922	3	1	3	1	
Vince Foweather	England	FW	1922–1923	4	1	4	1	
Arthur Gee	England	FW	1922–1923	8	2	8	2	
Bill Bradbury	England	MF	1922–1923	12	0	13	0	
George Guy	England	FW	1922–1923	15	7	15	7	Joint leading league scorer (1922–23)
George Nicholls	England	MF	1922–1923	17	0	17	0	
Jack Peart	England	FW	1922–1924	21	10	22	10	Manager of Rochdale 1923–1930
William Sandham	England	FW	1922–1923	22	7	23	7	Joint leading league scorer (1922–23)
Edward Watson	England	DF	1923	1	0	1	0	
John Brown	England	FW	1923	2	0	2	0	
Josiah Chapman	England	DF	1923	5	0	5	0	
Joe Clark	England	MF	1923–1924	16	1	16	1	
Frank Crowe	England	MF	1923–1924	18	5	20	5	
Cyril Hibberd	England	GK	1924	2	0	2	0	
Billy Oxley	England	FW	1924–1925	11	5	11	5	
Ed Stirling	Scotland	DF	1924–1925	13	0	13	0	
Jock Mills	Scotland	FW	1924–1925	16	3	17	3	
Joe Robson	England	DF	1925	4	0	4	0	
Jack Cawthra	England	GK	1925–1926	5	0	5	0	
Cecil Halkyard	England	MF	1925–1928	8	0	8	0	
Billy Smith	England	FW	1925–1926	10	2	10	2	
Billy Fergusson	England	FW	1925–1926	21	19	24	21	Leading league scorer (1925–26)
Alec Ross	Scotland	FW	1926	1	1	1	1	
Griffith Owen	England	FW	1926	3	0	3	0	
Reuben Butler	England	FW	1926	5	0	5	0	
Bob Schofield	England	FW	1926–1928	17	6	17	6	
Bill Hooper	England	FW	1926–1927	20	1	21	1	
Alfred Kellett	England	DF	1927	1	0	1	0	
Joe Clennell	England	FW	1927–1928	13	2	15	5	
John Stephenson	England	DF	1927–1928	22	0	22	0	
William Wood	England	GK	1928	1	0	1	0	
Eric Holroyd	England	MF	1928	1	0	1	0	
Albert Monks	England	GK	1928	1	0	1	0	
Thomas Bailey	Wales	MF	1928	1	0	1	0	
Harry Howlett	England	FW	1928	1	0	1	0	
Eddie Plane	England	GK	1928	2	0	2	0	
Charlie Howlett	England	FW	1928	2	0	2	0	
George Power	England	GK	1928–1929	3	0	3	0	
Oswald Littler	England	FW	1928–1929	4	1	4	1	
Uriah Miles	England	MF	1928	10	2	10	2	
Allan Murray	England	DF	1928–1929	12	1	12	1	
Jack Brierley	England	FW	1928–1929	14	7	14	7	
James Ellison	England	DF	1928–1929	16	0	16	0	
Reg Trotman	England	FW	1928–1929	23	10	24	10	
Albert Cooke	England	MF	1929	1	0	1	0	
Eric Silverwood	England	FW	1929	2	0	2	0	
Christopher Jones	Wales	FW	1929–1930	2	0	2	0	
Fred Appleyard	England	MF	1929–1932	6	0	7	0	
James Parton	England	MF	1929–1930	7	0	7	0	
Tom Lindsay	Scotland	MF	1929	7	0	7	0	
Len Crompton	England	GK	1929	11	0	11	0	
Ed Robson	England	GK	1929	12	0	12	0	
Phil Hope	England	DF	1929–1930	13	1	13	1	
Percy Hellyer	England	MF	1930	1	0	1	0	
Fred Fitton	England	FW	1930	1	0	1	0	
Thomas Warburton	England	MF	1930–1931	2	0	2	0	
William Blackburn	England	DF	1930	3	0	3	0	
Albert Latham	England	MF	1930	8	1	8	1	
Frank Hargreaves	England	FW	1930–1931	9	3	9	3	
George Turnbull	England	FW	1930–1931	10	2	10	2	
Austin Trippier	England	MF	1930–1931	12	1	12	1	
Jack Prince	England	GK	1930	15	0	16	0	
Harry Platt	England	MF	1930–1932	16	0	16	0	
Reg Grant	England	FW	1931	1	0	1	0	
John Whitelaw	Scotland	FW	1931	1	0	1	0	
Harry Bruce	England	DF	1931	2	0	2	0	
Robert Forster	England	MF	1931	2	0	2	0	
Clarence Constantine	England	DF	1931–1932	2	0	2	0	
Tommy Flannigan	Scotland	FW	1931	2	0	2	0	
Francis Chorlton	England	MF	1931	3	0	3	0	
Con Hilley	Scotland	MF	1931	3	0	3	0	
Roland Hill	England	MF	1931	2	0	3	0	
George Guyan	Scotland	FW	1931	4	1	4	1	
Edward Black	Scotland	DF	1931	8	0	8	0	
Ken Nisbet	Scotland	FW	1931–1932	12	2	12	2	
Bill Armstrong	England	DF	1931–1933	14	0	14	0	
James Beattie	Scotland	DF	1931–1932	14	0	15	0	
Adam Plunkett	Scotland	DF	1931–1932	18	0	18	0	
Reg Watson	England	FW	1931–1932	17	8	18	8	Leading league scorer (1931–32)
Ernest Steele	England	MF	1931–1932	19	3	20	3	
Benny Jones	England	FW	1931–1932	19	3	20	3	
Fred Brown	England	FW	1931–1932	21	6	21	6	
David Murray	South Africa	FW	1931–1932	22	3	23	4	
George White	England	FW	1932	1	0	1	0	
John Crowther	England	FW	1932	1	1	1	1	
Robert Rowe	England	FW	1932	1	0	1	0	
Bernard Lowery	England	MF	1932	1	0	1	0	
Bill Gardner	England	FW	1932	1	0	1	0	
William Gregson	England	DF	1932	1	0	1	0	
Ron Hornby	England	MF	1932	2	0	2	0	
Sydney Bell	England	MF	1932	2	0	2	0	
Tom Watson	England	FW	1932–1933	7	6	7	6	
Thomas Hill	England	FW	1932–1933	7	0	7	0	
Tim Williamson	Scotland	FW	1932–1933	7	2	8	2	
Frank Twine	England	DF	1932	10	0	10	0	
Tommy Hogg	England	MF	1932	10	1	10	1	
Jimmy Bimson	England	MF	1932	12	1	12	1	
Arthur Hawes	England	FW	1932	13	0	13	0	
Lewis Caunce	England	GK	1932	18	0	19	0	
George Beel	England	FW	1932–1933	20	8	21	8	
Harold Howarth	England	MF	1932, 1938	24	5	24	5	
Arthur Worrall	England	FW	1933	1	0	1	0	
William Peters	Scotland	MF	1933	1	0	1	0	
Harry Sharples	Unknown	DF	1933	2	0	2	0	
Harry Hope	England	FW	1933	2	0	2	0	
Harry Chadwick	England	FW	1933	1	0	1	0	
Willie Barrott	England	MF	1933	1	0	1	0	
Dermot Hoadley	England	MF	1933	2	0	2	0	
Stephen Spargo	England	DF	1933	4	0	4	0	
Walter Slicer	England	DF	1933–1934	4	0	4	0	
Thomas Shepherd	England	MF	1933–1934	4	0	4	0	
Danny McRorie	Scotland	FW	1933	5	0	5	0	
John Cairns	Scotland	FW	1933–1934	5	0	5	0	
Jack Butler	England	DF	1933–1934	5	0	6	0	
Ralph Williams	Wales	FW	1933	8	1	8	1	
Stan Bowsher	Wales	DF	1933	10	0	10	0	
Fred Fitton	England	FW	1933–1934	13	6	14	6	
William Douglas	Scotland	FW	1934	1	0	1	0	
Jimmy Coneys	England	FW	1934	2	0	2	0	
Harry Longbottom	England	MF	1934	2	0	2	0	
Billy Smith	England	FW	1934	3	1	4	2	Manager of Rochdale 1934–1935
Arnold Bliss	England	DF	1934	5	0	5	0	
Reg Cook	England	DF	1934	5	0	5	0	
Frank Ryder	England	MF	1934–1935	6	0	7	0	
Billy Thomas	England	MF	1934–1935	6	1	7	1	
Arthur Ives	England	DF	1934–1935	7	0	8	0	
Charlie Whyte	Scotland	MF	1934	9	1	9	1	
Philip Bartley	England	FW	1934–1935	14	3	14	3	
George Dobson	England	MF	1934–1935	15	5	18	5	
George Jordan	Scotland	DF	1934–1935	17	0	20	0	
Arthur Emerson	England	FW	1935	1	0	1	0	
Frank Huxley	England	DF	1935	1	0	1	0	
Stanley Taylor	?	MF	1935	2	0	2	0	
Robert Driver	England	GK	1935	2	0	2	0	
Christopher Cornthwaite	England	GK	1935–1936	6	0	6	0	
Fred Taylor	England	MF	1935	6	3	7	3	
Sidney Elliott	England	FW	1935–1936	11	1	11	1	
Harry Brierley	England	MF	1935–1937	20	2	21	2	
Matthew Johnson	England	MF	1935–1936	19	5	22	6	
Stanley Cook	England	DF	1936	1	0	2	0	
Cyril Crawshaw	England	FW	1936	2	0	2	0	
William Smith	England	DF	1936–1937	4	1	5	1	
Ted Marcroft	England	MF	1936	5	0	6	0	
Charlie Robinson	England	DF	1936–1937	18	0	19	0	
Harry Rowbotham	England	FW	1936–1937	19	1	20	1	
Alex McMurdo	Scotland	MF	1937	2	0	2	0	
Roland Haworth	England	MF	1937	2	0	2	0	
Edward Sperry	England	DF	1937	3	0	3	0	
Wilfred Barks	England	FW	1937	3	0	3	0	
Idris Williams	Wales	DF	1937–1938	4	0	4	0	
Bob Hardy	England	MF	1937–1938	7	0	7	0	
Frank Wilson	Scotland	MF	1937	7	1	8	1	
Micky Burke	Scotland	FW	1937–1938	8	0	9	0	
Alex Graham	Scotland	FW	1937	11	4	12	4	
Archie Young	Scotland	MF	1938	1	0	1	0	
John Barratt	England	MF	1938	1	0	1	0	
John Latimer	Scotland	MF	1938	1	0	1	0	
Henry Roberts	England	MF	1938	0	0	1	0	
Arnold Sutcliffe	England	MF	1938	2	0	2	0	
Georgie Mee	England	MF	1938	1	0	2	0	
Harry Howarth	England	MF	1938	4	1	4	1	
William Royan	Scotland	FW	1938	5	1	5	1	
Ernest Hobbs	England	DF	1938–1939	6	0	6	0	
Tom Douglas	Scotland	FW	1938	8	0	8	0	
Richard Haworth	England	MF	1938–1939	9	0	9	0	
William Keenan	Scotland	DF	1938–1939	9	0	9	0	
Albert Gregory	England	MF	1938–1939	9	0	9	0	
Adam Dawson	England	FW	1938	12	6	12	6	
Arthur Griffiths	Wales	FW	1938	14	5	14	5	
Joe Firth	England	FW	1938–1939	18	6	18	6	
Peter Vause	England	MF	1938–1939	20	13	21	13	
Tommy Prest	England	FW	1938–1939	21	6	22	6	
Jack Briggs	England	FW	1939	1	0	1	0	
Bryn Lewis	Wales	MF	1939	1	0	1	0	
Harold Knowles	England	FW	1939	0	0	1	1	
John Neary	England	DF	1939–1946	1	0	3	0	
John Gastall	England	FW	1939	4	1	4	1	
Arthur Jones	England	MF	1945–1946	1	0	3	0	
Jim Pearce	Wales	DF	1945	0	0	4	0	
Arthur Chesters	England	GK	1945–1946	0	0	6	0	
Sammy Makin	England	MF	1945–1946	5	1	7	2	
Jack Brindle	England	MF	1945–1947	1	0	7	1	
Syd Pomphrey	England	DF	1945–1946	9	0	13	0	
Frank Walkden	Scotland	MF	1946	1	0	1	0	
Jimmy Cunliffe	England	FW	1946	2	0	2	0	
Walter Jones	England	FW	1946	2	2	2	2	
Charlie Hurst	England	DF	1946	4	1	4	1	
Tom West	England	FW	1946–1947	4	2	4	2	
Tom Hargreaves	England	DF	1946	7	0	7	0	
Joe Rodi	Scotland	MF	1946	9	3	9	3	
Alec Carruthers	Scotland	MF	1946–1947	13	4	16	6	
Billy Hallard	England	MF	1946–1947	17	2	20	2	
Bill Henderson	Scotland	GK	1946–1947	17	0	20	0	
John Oakes	Scotland	MF	1947	1	0	1	0	
Wally Cornock	Australia	GK	1947	1	0	1	0	
Charlie Longdon	England	FW	1947–1948	2	0	2	0	
Austin Collier	England	DF	1947	6	0	6	0	
Sam Earl	England	FW	1947	4	1	6	1	
Charlie Briggs	England	GK	1947	12	0	12	0	
Alan Moorhouse	England	MF	1947–1948	17	3	17	3	
Ron Johnston	Scotland	FW	1947–1948	17	7	19	7	
Jimmy Britton	England	MF	1947–1948	20	0	21	0	
Hugh Colvan	Scotland	FW	1948	1	0	1	0	
Eddie Anderson	Scotland	DF	1948	1	0	1	0	
Mike Skivington	Scotland	DF	1948	1	0	1	0	
Cecil Heydon	England	MF	1948	1	0	1	0	
Walter Price	England	DF	1948	1	0	1	0	
Alex Hawson	Scotland	MF	1948	1	0	1	0	
George Eastham	England	FW	1948	2	0	3	0	
Alex Anderson	Scotland	GK	1948	4	0	4	0	
Arnold Bonell	England	DF	1948	5	0	5	0	
Con Gallacher	Northern Ireland	FW	1948	6	1	6	1	
Ronnie Hood	Scotland	FW	1948–1949	9	1	9	1	
Konrad Kapler	Poland	MF	1949	4	0	4	0	
Benny Nicol	Scotland	FW	1949–1950	5	1	5	1	
Wally Stanners	Scotland	GK	1949	5	0	6	0	
Bert Williams	England	FW	1949–1950	8	3	8	3	
Bob Smyth	England	MF	1950	3	1	3	1	
Gordon Medd	England	MF	1950	5	1	5	1	
Bill Heaton	England	MF	1950–1951	5	0	6	0	
Archie Hughes	Wales	GK	1950	9	0	9	0	
Bert Lomas	England	GK	1950–1951	9	0	12	0	
Harry Mills	England	FW	1951	1	0	1	0	
Fred Fisher	England	DF	1951	1	0	1	0	
Ken Crowther	England	MF	1951	2	0	2	0	
Bill Jennings	England	FW	1951	3	1	3	1	
Jim Drury	Scotland	MF	1951–1952	4	1	4	1	
Walter Keeley	England	FW	1951	4	0	5	0	
Joe Coupe	England	DF	1951–1952	8	0	8	0	
Jim Hazzleton	England	FW	1951–1952	11	1	11	1	
Eric Hayton	England	MF	1951–1952	12	0	12	0	
Alex McNichol	Scotland	FW	1951	17	3	17	3	
Eric Barber	England	MF	1951–1952	17	2	17	2	
Frank Tomlinson	England	MF	1951–1952	20	2	22	4	
Mark Radcliffe	England	GK	1952	1	0	1	0	
Norman Case	England	FW	1952	2	0	2	0	
Sandy Lister	Scotland	FW	1952–1953	2	0	2	0	
Charlie Hogan	England	MF	1952–1953	3	0	3	0	
Billy Morris	England	MF	1952–1953	4	1	4	1	
Alan Ball	England	FW	1952	5	1	5	1	
Tom Hindle	England	MF	1952	6	1	6	1	
Stan Marriott	England	FW	1952–1953	6	2	6	2	
Brian Sutton	England	GK	1952–1953 1955	13	0	13	0	
Les Murray	Scotland	FW	1952–1953	16	3	16	3	
Jack Warner	Wales	MF	1952–1953	21	0	22	0	Player-manager of Rochdale 1952–1953
Brian Mottershead	England	FW	1953	1	0	1	0	
Adam Wasilewski	Poland	FW	1953	4	1	4	1	
Robert Priday	South Africa	MF	1953	5	1	5	1	
John Graham	England	FW	1953	10	1	10	1	
Danny Boxshall	England	MF	1953	11	3	11	3	
Ken Rose	England	FW	1953	11	0	11	0	
Bill Tolson	England	FW	1953–1954	10	0	11	0	
Fred Evans	England	FW	1953–1954	12	0	12	0	
Graham Cordell	England	GK	1953–1954	15	0	16	0	
Des Frost	England	FW	1953–1954	16	7	17	7	
Eddie Lyons	England	DF	1953–1955	19	1	22	1	
Ray Calderbank	England	FW	1954	1	0	1	0	
George Underwood	England	DF	1954	19	0	19	0	
George Johnson	England	FW	1955	1	0	1	0	
Dave Neville	England	DF	1955	1	0	1	0	
Harry Fearnley	England	GK	1955	1	0	1	0	
Ralph Moremont	England	MF	1955	1	0	1	0	
Calvin Symonds	Bermuda	FW	1955	1	0	1	0	
Harry Jackson	England	FW	1955	1	1	1	1	
Bernard Stonehouse	England	MF	1955–1956	19	1	19	1	
Johnny McClelland	England	FW	1955–1956	24	5	24	5	
Reg Tapley	England	MF	1956	1	0	1	0	
Tommy Todd	Scotland	FW	1956	5	1	5	1	
Gerry Molloy	England	MF	1956	6	0	6	0	
Cyril Lello	England	MF	1956	11	0	11	0	
Steve Parr	England	DF	1956–1957	16	1	16	1	
George Newell	England	DF	1957	1	0	1	0	
Terry Mulvoy	England	FW	1957	2	0	2	0	
George Torrance	Scotland	GK	1957	2	0	2	0	
Harold Rudman	England	DF	1957–1958	21	1	22	1	
Jock Wallace	Scotland	DF	1958	7	0	7	0	
Gordon McBain	Scotland	MF	1958	10	1	10	1	
Alan Moore	England	MF	1958–1959	11	2	11	2	
Donald Whiston	England	DF	1958	14	0	14	0	
Jim Maguire	Scotland	MF	1958–1959	15	0	18	0	
George Heyes	England	GK	1958–1960	24	0	24	0	
Bobby Entwistle	England	FW	1959	1	0	1	0	
Malcolm Hussey	England	DF	1959	1	0	1	0	
Ken McDowall	England	MF	1960–1961	6	0	7	0	
Jack Pollitt	England	FW	1960–1961	6	1	8	2	
Joffre Mckay	Scotland	GK	1960–1961	9	0	14	0	
Ollie Norris	Northern Ireland	FW	1961	2	1	2	1	
Bryn Owen	England	DF	1961–1962	6	0	6	0	
Peter Whyke	England	FW	1961–1962	5	0	7	0	
Brian Birch	England	FW	1961	11	0	12	0	
Tony Moulden	England	FW	1962, 1966	6	1	8	1	
David Wells	England	DF	1963	8	0	9	0	
Dave Kerry	England	FW	1963–1964	12	4	14	5	
John Turley	England	FW	1964–1965	22	5	24	6	
Ian McQueen	England	FW	1965–1967	16	4	16	4	
Barrie Ratcliffe	England	MF	1965	12	1	17	1	
Neville Bannister	England	MF	1965–1966	19	2	20	2	
Brian Handley	England	FW	1966	3	0	3	0	
John Heath	England	GK	1966	6	0	6	0	
Graham Collins	England	MF	1966	7	0	8	0	
Bill Calder	Scotland	FW	1966–1967	8	1	9	1	
Ray Daubney	England	MF	1966–1968	12	2	12	2	
Barrie Wheatley	England	FW	1966–1967	13	4	15	4	
Jimmy Pennington	England	MF	1966–1967	14	0	15	0	
Paul Crossley	England	MF	1966	17	2	18	2	
Brian Richardson	England	MF	1966–1967	19	1	20	1	
David Dow	England	DF	1967–1968	8	0	8	0	
Brian Eastham	England	DF	1967	13	0	14	0	
Jack Winspear	England	MF	1967–1968	16	3	16	3	
David Crompton	England	MF	1967	17	0	17	0	
Frank McEwen	Republic of Ireland	MF	1967–1968	17	2	18	2	
Stewart Holden	England	DF	1967	21	0	21	0	
Les Harley	England	MF	1968	5	0	5	0	
Ken Bracewell	England	DF	1968	5	0	5	0	
Ernie Wilkinson	England	DF	1968	9	0	9	0	
Terry Melling	England	FW	1968–1969	20	8	20	8	
Paul Clarke	England	DF	1969–1972	11	0	12	0	
Dave Pearson	Wales	DF	1970	3	0	3	0	
Rod Jones	England	GK	1971–1974	19	0	23	0	
Jim Bowie	Scotland	MF	1972	3	0	3	0	
Harry Wainman	England	GK	1972	9	0	9	0	
Barry Bradbury	England	DF	1972–1974	15	0	18	0	
Jimmy Burt	Scotland	DF	1973	4	0	4	0	
Eamonn Kavanagh	England	MF	1973	4	0	4	0	
Roger Denton	England	DF	1974	2	0	2	0	
Bob Hutchinson	England	FW	1974	2	1	2	1	
John Taylor	England	GK	1974	3	0	3	0	
Ian Buckley	England	DF	1974	6	0	6	0	
Gary Hulmes	England	FW	1974–1976	10	1	11	1	
Harold Martin	England	DF	1974–1975	14	0	14	0	
Neil Young	England	FW	1974–1975	13	4	17	6	
David Seddon	England	DF	1974–1975	23	0	23	0	
Chris Duffey	England	MF	1975	2	0	2	0	
Brian Oliver	England	GK	1975–1976	3	0	4	0	
Billy Bell	England	MF	1975	6	0	6	0	
Andy Sweeney	England	MF	1975–1976	17	0	20	0	
Joe Murty	Scotland	MF	1975–1976	20	2	21	2	
David Ainsworth	England	FW	1976	2	0	2	0	
Stuart Mason	England	DF	1976	2	0	2	0	
Paul Cuddy	England	DF	1977	1	0	1	0	
George Hamstead	England	MF	1977	4	0	4	0	
Steve Shaw	England	MF	1977–1978	6	0	7	0	
Adie Green	England	MF	1977–1978	7	0	7	0	
Jimmy Mullen	England	MF	1977	8	1	8	1	
John Dungworth	England	FW	1977	14	3	14	3	
Chris Shyne	England	GK	1977–1979	20	0	21	0	
Ted Oliver	England	MF	1977–1980	22	1	23	1	
Bobby Finc	England	MF	1978	1	0	1	0	
Geoff Forster	England	FW	1978	1	0	1	0	
John Price	England	MF	1978	12	0	13	0	
Phil Ashworth	England	FW	1978	11	0	13	1	
Andy Slack	England	GK	1978	15	0	17	0	
Peter Creamer	England	DF	1978–1979	20	0	20	0	
Mike Milne	Scotland	DF	1979	2	0	2	0	
Doug Collins	England	MF	1979	8	0	8	0	
John McDermott	England	MF	1979	8	1	8	1	
Laurie Milligan	England	DF	1979–1980	9	0	9	0	
Colin Waldron	England	DF	1979–1980	19	0	22	0	
Neil Colbourne	England	GK	1980	1	0	1	0	
Bob Higgins	England	DF	1980	5	0	6	0	
Andy Duggan	England	DF	1987, 1991	4	0	6	0	
Andy Stafford	England	MF	1982	1	1	1	1	
Carl Swan	England	DF	1982	3	0	4	0	
Willie Garner	Scotland	DF	1982	4	0	5	0	
Peter Nicholson	England	FW	1982–1983	7	0	7	0	
Jack Trainer	Scotland	DF	1982	7	0	9	0	
Paul Comstive	England	MF	1982–1983	9	2	10	2	
Geoff Thomas	England	MF	1982–1984	11	1	12	1	
Steve Warriner	England	MF	1982	12	1	14	1	
Gerry McElhinney	Northern Ireland	DF	1982–1983	20	1	20	1	
Roy Greaves	England	FW	1982–1983	21	0	22	0	
Everton Carr	Antigua and Barbuda	DF	1983	9	0	9	0	
Jimmy Greenhoff	England	FW	1983	16	0	17	0	Player-manager of Rochdale 1983–1984
Malcolm O'Connor	England	FW	1983–1984	16	3	18	3	
Brian Greenhoff	England	DF	1983–1984	16	0	19	0	
Mark Ennis	England	DF	1984	1	0	1	0	
Andy Dean	England	DF	1984	1	0	1	0	
Gary Haworth	England	FW	1984	1	0	1	0	
John Pemberton	England	DF	1984	1	0	1	0	
Les Strong	England	DF	1984	1	0	1	0	
Jimmy Blake	England	DF	1984	2	0	2	0	
Ged Keegan	England	MF	1984	2	0	3	0	
Tommy English	England	FW	1984	3	1	3	1	
Tony Moore	England	DF	1984	3	0	3	0	
John Humphreys	England	FW	1984	6	0	6	0	
Steve Edwards	England	DF	1984	4	0	6	0	
Mike Fielding	England	DF	1984	6	0	7	0	
Les Lawrence	England	FW	1984	15	4	17	5	
Jim McCluskie	England	FW	1984–1986	19	0	20	0	
John Cavanagh	England	DF	1984–1985	17	0	21	0	
Steve Tapley	England	DF	1985	1	0	1	0	
Graham Hurst	England	MF	1985	1	0	1	0	
Tony Towers	England	MF	1985	2	0	2	0	
Neil Ashworth	England	MF	1985	1	0	2	0	
David Tong	England	MF	1985	2	0	2	0	
Garry Haire	England	MF	1985	3	0	3	0	
Don McAllister	England	DF	1985	3	0	4	0	
Tony Towner	England	MF	1985–1986	5	0	8	0	
Peter Robinson	England	DF	1985	12	0	12	0	
Phil Martin–Chambers	England	DF	1985	10	0	12	0	
Phil Dwyer	Wales	DF	1985	15	1	15	1	
Ronnie Hildersley	Scotland	MF	1985–1986	16	0	16	0	
Peter Shearer	England	MF	1986	1	0	2	2	
Mark Rees	England	MF	1986	3	0	3	0	
Paddy McGeeney	England	MF	1986	3	0	3	0	
Winston White	England	MF	1986	4	0	4	0	
Steve Carney	England	DF	1986	4	0	5	0	
Simon Gibson	England	DF	1986	5	0	9	0	
Dave Mossman	England	MF	1986	8	0	10	0	
Ray McHale	England	MF	1986	7	0	10	0	
Mick Wood	England	FW	1986–1987	6	3	10	3	
Ian Measham	England	DF	1986	12	0	12	0	
Neil Mills	England	FW	1986–1987	10	0	14	2	
Carl Hudson	England	DF	1986	15	1	20	2	
Mark Hunt	England	FW	1987–1988	2	1	4	1	
Nigel Thompson	England	MF	1987	5	0	6	0	
Zacari Hughes	Australia	DF	1987–1989	2	0	6	0	
Derrick Parker	England	FW	1987	7	1	9	2	
John Hudson	England	MF	1987	19	1	19	1	
Paul Hancox	England	MF	1988	2	0	2	0	
Danny Crerand	England	MF	1988	3	0	3	0	
Paul Wood	England	MF	1988–1989	5	0	7	0	
John Moore	Hong Kong	FW	1988	10	2	10	2	
Ernie Moss	England	FW	1988	10	2	10	2	
Ashley Fothergill	England	MF	1988–1989	9	0	10	0	
Billy Roberts	England	FW	1989	1	0	1	0	
Chris Lucketti	England	DF	1989	1	0	1	0	
Jason Hasford	England	FW	1989	1	0	1	0	
Carl Alford	England	FW	1989	4	0	4	0	
Joe McIntyre	England	DF	1989	4	0	4	0	
Dave Windridge	England	MF	1989	5	0	5	0	
Colin Small	England	MF	1989–1990	7	1	7	1	
Robbie Whellans	England	FW	1989–1990	11	1	12	1	
Paul Jones	England	DF	1989	14	2	14	2	
Kevin Stonehouse	England	FW	1989–1990	14	2	19	3	
Alan Ainscow	England	MF	1989–1990	20	0	24	0	
Phil Lockett	England	MF	1990–1991	3	0	3	0	
Steve Milligan	England	DF	1990	5	1	5	1	
Gary Henshaw	England	MF	1990	9	1	9	1	
Lee Duxbury	England	MF	1990	10	0	11	0	
Dave Norton	England	MF	1990	9	0	11	0	
Gareth Gray	England	GK	1990–1992	6	0	13	0	
Chris Blundell	England	DF	1990–1991	14	0	19	0	
Tony Colleton	England	FW	1991	1	0	1	0	
Paul Herring	England	MF	1991	1	0	1	0	
Kevin Dearden	England	GK	1991	2	0	2	0	
Leigh Palin	England	MF	1991	3	0	3	0	
Ian McInerney	England	FW	1991	4	1	4	1	
David Williams	England	GK	1991	6	0	8	0	
Steve Kinsey	England	MF	1991–1992	6	1	8	1	
Jason Anders	England	FW	1991–1993	17	1	19	1	
Steve Morgan	Wales	MF	1991–1992	23	3	23	3	
Jack Ashurst	Scotland	DF	1992	1	0	2	0	
Tony Beever	England	FW	1992–1993	1	0	2	0	
Andy Kilner	England	MF	1992	3	0	3	0	
John Stiles	England	MF	1992	4	0	4	0	
Steve Mulrain	England	FW	1992–1993	8	2	9	2	
Barry Cowdrill	England	DF	1992	15	1	15	1	
Carl Parker	England	MF	1992–1993	16	1	21	1	
Andy Howard	England	FW	1992–1994	20	3	24	3	
Tim Clarke	England	GK	1993	2	0	2	0	
Noel Luke	England	MF	1993	3	0	3	0	
Don Page	England	FW	1993	4	1	4	1	
Trevor Snowden	England	MF	1993	14	0	14	0	
Alan Finley	England	DF	1994	1	0	1	0	
Craig Whitington	England	FW	1994	1	0	1	0	
Gary Shelton	England	MF	1994	3	0	3	0	
Stuart Rimmer	England	FW	1994	3	0	3	0	
Neil Dunford	England	GK	1994	2	0	3	0	
Matt Dickins	England	GK	1994	4	0	5	0	
Richard Sharpe	England	FW	1994–1995	16	2	23	3	
Neil Mitchell	England	MF	1995–1996	4	0	4	0	
Jason Hardy	England	DF	1995–1996	7	0	7	0	
Paul Moulden	England	FW	1995–1996	16	1	21	6	
Franny Powell	England	MF	1996	2	0	2	0	
Neil Barlow	England	DF	1996	2	0	2	0	
Jamie Price	England	DF	1996	3	0	3	0	
Jimmy Proctor	England	MF	1996	3	0	3	0	
Paul Lyons	England	DF	1996	3	0	3	0	
Mickey Brown	England	MF	1996	5	0	5	0	
Kevin Pilkington	England	GK	1996	6	0	6	0	
Mike Cecere	England	FW	1996	4	1	7	1	
Wayne Dowell	England	DF	1996–1997	7	0	7	0	
Andy Scott	England	DF	1997–1998	3	0	3	0	
Craig Smith	England	FW	1997	4	0	4	0	
Glen Robson	England	FW	1997–1998	10	0	10	0	
Adam Reed	England	DF	1997–1998	10	0	12	1	
Mark Carter	England	FW	1997–1998	11	2	13	2	
John Pender	Republic of Ireland	DF	1997–1998	14	0	17	0	
David Gray	England	FW	1998	3	0	3	0	
Miguel de Souza	England	FW	1998	5	0	5	0	
Isidro Díaz	Spain	MF	1998	14	2	18	2	
Mark Williams	England	DF	1998–1999	14	1	18	1	
Graham Hicks	England	DF	1999	1	0	2	0	
Phil Priestley	England	GK	1999–2000	3	0	4	0	
Richard Green	England	DF	1999	6	0	6	0	
Julian Dowe	England	FW	1999	7	0	9	1	
Jason Lydiate	England	DF	1999	14	1	14	1	
Gareth Stoker	England	MF	1999	12	1	14	1	
Damon Searle	Wales	DF	1999	14	0	14	0	
Warren Peyton	England	MF	2000	1	0	1	0	
Danny Taylor	England	DF	2000	1	0	1	0	
Scott Wilson	England	MF	2000	1	0	1	0	
David Walsh	England	FW	2000	0	0	1	0	
Lee Buggie	England	FW	2000	2	0	2	0	
Gary Hamilton	Northern Ireland	FW	2000	3	0	3	0	
Paul Gibson	England	GK	2000	5	0	5	0	
Christian Lee	England	FW	2000	5	1	5	1	
Simon Davies	England	MF	2000–2001	12	1	16	1	
Simon Coleman	England	DF	2000–2002	16	1	18	1	
Karl Rose	England	FW	2001	0	0	1	0	
Dean Howell	England	DF	2001	3	0	3	0	
Andy Turner	England	FW	2001	4	0	4	0	
Darren Dunning	England	MF	2001–2002	5	0	5	0	
Kevin Kyle	Scotland	FW	2001	6	0	6	0	
Paul Wheatcroft	England	FW	2001	6	3	6	3	
Marcus Hahnemann	United States	GK	2001	5	0	7	0	
Steve Banks	England	GK	2001–2002	15	0	15	0	
Alan McLoughlin	Republic of Ireland	MF	2001–2002	18	1	20	1	
Steve Macauley	England	DF	2002	6	0	7	0	
Lee Hodges	England	MF	2002–2003	7	0	8	0	
Steve Jones	Northern Ireland	FW	2002	9	1	9	1	
Ian Bishop	England	MF	2002	8	0	9	0	
Stephen Hill	England	DF	2002–2003	11	0	13	0	
Rory Patterson	Northern Ireland	FW	2002–2004	15	0	18	0	
Gavin Melaugh	Northern Ireland	MF	2002–2003	19	1	24	2	
Shane Cansdell–Sherriff	Australia	DF	2002, 2013	20	0	21	0	
Neil Bennett	England	GK	2003	1	0	1	0	
Craig Strachan	Scotland	MF	2003	1	0	1	0	
Michael Taylor	England	MF	2003	2	0	2	0	
Willo Flood	Republic of Ireland	MF	2003	6	0	6	0	
Darren Hockenhull	England	DF	2003	7	1	7	1	
Kevin Donovan	England	MF	2003–2004	7	0	7	0	
Lee Andrews	England	DF	2003	8	0	8	0	
Neil Redfearn	England	MF	2003–2004	9	0	9	0	
Mickael Antoine–Curier	France	FW	2003	8	1	10	1	
Andy Bishop	England	FW	2003–2004	10	1	11	1	
Ged Brannan	England	MF	2003	11	1	13	1	
Chris Shuker	England	MF	2003	14	1	15	1	
Kangana Ndiwa	DR Congo	MF	2004	1	0	1	0	
Martin Pemberton	England	MF	2004	1	0	1	0	
Jeff Smith	England	MF	2004	1	0	1	0	
Paul Weller	England	MF	2004	5	0	5	0	
Brian Cash	Republic of Ireland	MF	2004	6	0	7	0	
Ashley Probets	England	DF	2004–2005	9	0	12	0	
Danny Livesey	England	DF	2004	13	0	13	0	
Shaun Smith	England	DF	2004	13	0	13	0	
Taiwo Atieno	Kenya	FW	2004–2005	13	2	16	2	
Neil Brisco	England	MF	2004–2005	16	0	17	0	
Matt Williams	England	DF	2005	1	0	1	0	
Marcus Richardson	England	FW	2005	2	0	2	0	
Marc Richards	England	FW	2005	5	2	5	2	
Ben Kitchen	England	MF	2005–2006	9	0	10	0	
Warren Goodhind	South Africa	DF	2005–2006	10	0	12	0	
Tommy Jaszczun	England	MF	2005	17	0	19	0	
Theo Coleman	England	DF	2006	1	0	1	0	
Callum Warburton	England	MF	2006	4	0	5	0	
William Mocquet	France	FW	2006–2007	7	1	7	1	
Darrell Clarke	England	MF	2006	12	1	12	1	
James Sharp	England	DF	2006	12	1	14	1	
Keith Barker	England	FW	2006	12	0	16	1	
Iyseden Christie	England	FW	2006	19	2	20	2	
Ben Wharton	England	FW	2007	1	0	1	0	
Tom Bates	England	MF	2007	2	0	2	0	
Reuben Reid	England	FW	2007	2	0	2	0	
Rob Atkinson	England	DF	2007	2	0	2	0	
Kelvin Etuhu	Nigeria	MF	2007	4	2	4	2	
Stephen Turnbull	England	MF	2007	4	0	4	0	
Scott Taylor	England	FW	2007	4	0	4	0	
Glenn Poole	England	MF	2007	6	0	6	0	
Danny Reet	England	FW	2007	6	0	6	0	
Guy Branston	England	DF	2007	4	0	6	0	
Nathan D'Laryea	England	DF	2007–2008	6	0	10	0	
Kelvin Lomax	England	DF	2007	10	0	10	0	
Louis Dodds	England	FW	2007	12	2	12	2	
James Spencer	England	GK	2007–2008	20	0	22	0	
Rory Prendergast	England	MF	2007	19	2	23	4	
Raphale Evans	England	DF	2008	1	0	1	0	
George Bowyer	England	DF	2008	1	0	1	0	
Kyle Lambert	England	MF	2008	1	0	1	0	
Jordan Rhodes	Scotland	FW	2008	5	2	5	2	
Chris Basham	England	DF	2008	13	0	13	0	
Jon Shaw	England	MF	2008–2009	7	1	13	1	
Mark Jones	Wales	MF	2008–2009	9	0	13	0	
Tommy Lee	England	GK	2008	11	0	14	0	
Rene Howe	England	FW	2008	20	9	23	9	
Danny Taberner	England	GK	2009	0	0	1	0	
Chris Brown	England	DF	2009	0	0	1	0	Youth Team Manager 2016–
Josh Brizell	England	DF	2009	0	0	1	0	
Tom Newey	England	DF	2009	2	0	2	0	
Danny Glover	England	FW	2009	2	0	2	0	
Gary Madine	England	FW	2009	3	0	3	0	
Marcus Magna	France	FW	2009	2	0	3	0	
Scott Spencer	England	FW	2009	4	0	5	0	
Dale Stephens	England	MF	2009	6	1	6	1	
Simon Whaley	England	MF	2009	9	2	9	2	
Matthew Flynn	England	DF	2009–2010	11	0	12	0	
Tom Heaton	England	GK	2009–2010	12	0	12	0	
Kenny Arthur	Scotland	GK	2009–2010	15	0	18	0	
Jason Taylor	England	MF	2009–2010	23	1	23	1	
Luke Daniels	England	GK	2010	1	0	1	0	
Helio André	Angola	FW	2010	1	0	2	0	
Deane Smalley	England	FW	2010	3	0	3	0	
Matty Edwards	Scotland	GK	2010–2012	8	0	9	0	
Reece Gray	England	MF	2010–2014	13	2	13	2	
Josh Thompson	England	DF	2010–2011	12	1	14	1	
Anthony Elding	England	FW	2010	17	3	21	5	
Tope Obadeyi	England	MF	2010, 2012	17	2	17	2	
Andy Haworth	England	MF	2010, 2013	14	0	14	0	
Jack Redshaw	England	FW	2010, 2017	3	0	5	0	
Paul Marshall	England	MF	2011	1	0	1	0	
Marc Twaddle	Scotland	MF	2011–2012	2	0	3	0	
Ahmed Benali	England	MF	2011	2	0	3	0	
Roland Bergkamp	Netherlands	FW	2011	3	0	3	0	
Matthew Barnes–Homer	England	FW	2011	5	0	7	0	
Nathan Eccleston	England	FW	2011	5	1	7	1	
Harry Bunn	England	FW	2011	6	0	8	1	
Robbie Williams	England	DF	2011	9	0	9	0	
Liam Dickinson	England	FW	2011	14	0	14	0	
Neal Trotman	England	DF	2011	12	0	14	0	
Jake Kean	England	GK	2011	14	0	15	0	
Pim Balkestein	Netherlands	DF	2011	13	0	15	0	
David Ball	England	FW	2011–2012	14	3	15	4	
David Lucas	England	GK	2011–2012	16	0	20	0	
Stephen Jordan	England	DF	2011–2012	19	0	21	0	
Owain Fôn Williams	Wales	GK	2011	22	0	22	0	
Dean Holden	England	DF	2011–2012	21	0	22	0	
Sam Minihan	England	DF	2012	1	0	1	0	
Simon Hackney	England	MF	2012	2	0	2	0	
Godwin Ababaki	Nigeria	FW	2012	2	0	2	0	
Ben Smith	England	GK	2012	0	0	2	0	
Neill Byrne	Republic of Ireland	DF	2012–2013	3	0	4	0	
Sean McConville	England	MF	2012	4	0	4	0	
Daniel Bogdanovic	Malta	FW	2012	5	1	5	1	
Brett Ormerod	England	FW	2012	5	1	5	1	
Craig Curran	England	FW	2012	4	0	6	0	
Ian Craney	England	MF	2012–2013	6	0	9	0	
Peter Kurucz	Hungary	GK	2012	11	0	11	0	
Matthew Pearson	England	DF	2012–2013	9	0	13	0	
Michael Symes	England	FW	2012	15	4	15	4	
Kevin Amankwaah	England	DF	2012	16	0	16	0	
Kevin Long	Republic of Ireland	DF	2012	16	0	16	0	
Joel Logan	England	MF	2012–2015	15	0	17	0	
Terry Gornell	England	FW	2012–2013	19	5	19	5	
Ray Putterill	England	MF	2012–2013	18	1	22	2	
Darcy O'Connor	England	DF	2013	1	0	1	0	
Robbie Thomson	Scotland	GK	2013	1	0	1	0	
Wayne Thomas	England	DF	2013	2	0	2	0	
Ritchie Jones	England	MF	2013	3	0	3	0	
Javan Vidal	England	DF	2013	2	0	3	0	
Lee Molyneux	England	DF	2013	3	0	3	0	
Gary Dicker	Republic of Ireland	MF	2013–2014	12	1	15	1	
Craig Lynch	England	FW	2014	1	0	1	0	
Sean McGinty	Republic of Ireland	DF	2014	1	0	1	0	
Johny Diba Musangu	DR Congo	GK	2014	1	0	1	0	
George Porter	England	FW	2014	2	0	2	0	
Nyal Bell	England	FW	2014–2015	3	0	3	0	
Tomasz Cywka	Poland	MF	2014–2015	3	0	5	0	
Shamir Fenelon	Republic of Ireland	FW	2014	4	0	5	0	
Jack Muldoon	England	FW	2014	3	0	6	0	
Conrad Logan	Republic of Ireland	GK	2014–2015	13	0	15	0	
John–Christophe Ayina	France	FW	2015	1	0	1	0	
John O'Sullivan	Republic of Ireland	MF	2015	2	0	3	0	
James Hooper	England	FW	2015	2	0	3	0	
Febian Brandy	Saint Kitts and Nevis	FW	2015	4	0	4	0	
Joel Pereira	Portugal	GK	2015	6	0	8	0	
Lewis Alessandra	England	MF	2015–2016	8	1	11	2	
Jamie Jones	England	GK	2015	13	0	13	0	
Dave Syers	England	MF	2016	6	0	6	0	
Sanmi Odelusi	England	FW	2016	15	0	19	1	
David Owusu	England	MF	2017	1	0	1	0	
Joel Taylor	England	DF	2017	1	0	1	0	
Reece Brown	England	DF	2017	3	0	4	0	
Ben Wilson	England	GK	2017	8	0	8	0	
Jordan Slew	England	FW	2017	5	0	9	1	
Brendan Moore	United States	GK	2017–2018	14	0	18	0	
Donervon Daniels	Montserrat	DF	2017–2018	15	0	18	0	
Juwon Hamzat	England	DF	2018	0	0	1	0	
James Finnerty	Republic of Ireland	DF	2018	0	0	1	0	
Florent Hoti	Scotland	MF	2018	0	0	2	0	
Florian Yonsian	Ivory Coast	FW	2018–2019	0	0	3	0	
Connor Randall	England	DF	2018	1	0	3	0	
Billy Knott	England	MF	2018	4	0	4	0	
Alex Dobre	Romania	MF	2018	5	1	5	1	
Harrison Hopper	England	DF	2018–2021	2	0	8	0	
Mangus Norman	England	GK	2018–2019	7	0	12	0	
Zach Clough	England	FW	2018–2019	9	0	13	1	
Sam Hart	England	DF	2018	14	0	16	0	
Louie Clarkson	England	MF	2019	0	0	1	0	
Peter Thomas	England	FW	2019	0	0	1	0	
Toby Phillips	England	MF	2019	0	0	1	0	
Joe Dunne	England	DF	2019–2021	0	0	4	0	
Tyler Magloire	England	DF	2019–2020	2	0	5	0	
Rory Holden	Northern Ireland	FW	2019	6	0	7	0	
Andy Lonergan	England	GK	2019	7	0	7	0	
Lewis Bradley	England	FW	2019–2020	3	0	8	0	
Ethan Hamilton	Scotland	MF	2019	14	4	14	4	
Kacper Mialkowski	Poland	DF	2020	0	0	1	0	
Yeboah Amankwah	England	DF	2020	0	0	2	0	
Tolaji Bola	England	DF	2020	11	0	12	0	
Jack Vale	Wales	FW	2021	3	0	3	0	
Gabriel Osho	England	DF	2021	22	1	22	1	
Josh Andrews	England	FW	2021–2022	17	3	20	5	
Joel Coleman	England	GK	2021–2022	19	0	21	0	
Tahvon Campbell	England	MF	2022–2023	20	2	21	3	
Luke Charman	England	FW	2022	20	2	20	2	
Max Clark	England	DF	2022	23	1	23	1	
Paul Downing	England	DF	2022	10	0	10	0	
Jake Eastwood	England	GK	2022–2023	9	0	9	0	
Ben Nelson	England	DF	2022	10	0	12	0	
Rayhaan Tulloch	England	FW	2022	9	0	14	0	
Cieran Slicker	England	GK	2022	0	0	3	0	
Connor Malley	England	MF	2022	9	0	14	0	
Kevin Dos Santos	England	MF	2022	0	0	1	0	
Oscar Kelly	England	MF	2022–	1	0	4	0	As of end of 2025–26 season
Owen Dodgson	England	DF	2023	18	1	18	1	
Toby Mullarkey	England	DF	2023	12	0	12	0	
Darren Ehimamiegho	England	FW	2023	1	0	1	0	
Bradley Kelly	England	GK	2023–2025	1	0	6	0	
Tommy McDermott	England	MF	2023	4	0	4	0	
Kwaku Oduroh	England	DF	2023–2024	20	1	22	1	
Michael Afuye	England	MF	2023	8	0	10	0	
Max Conway	England	DF	2023	6	0	6	0	
Luke Mann	England	MF	2023	0	0	1	0	
Isaac Burgess	England	MF	2023–2024	1	0	4	0	
Tiernan Brooks	Republic of Ireland	GK	2024	12	0	12	0	
Dan Sassi	England	MF	2024	14	0	14	0	
Jacob Chapman	Australia	GK	2024	6	0	6	0	
Sam Mather	England	MF	2024	10	2	10	2	
Corey Edwards	England	MF	2024–	8	0	13	0	As of end of 2025–26 season
Luke McNicholas	Republic of Ireland	GK	2024–2025	9	0	9	0	
Aaron Henry	England	MF	2024–2025	14	1	16	1	
Ody Alfa	Nigeria	FW	2024	3	0	5	0	
Sam Waller	England	GK	2024–2025	20	0	24	0	
Courtney Senior	England	MF	2024	6	0	9	0	
Matthew Dennis	England	FW	2024–2025	4	0	10	2	
Joe Westley	England	FW	2024	3	0	3	0	
Matt Penney	England	DF	2024–2025	1	0	2	0	
Jid Okeke	Germany	DF	2024–2025	8	0	14	0	
David Robson	Wales	GK	2024	8	0	10	0	
Charlie Weston	England	MF	2024–2025	8	0	16	1	
Ben Horne	England	DF	2024	0	0	2	0	
Joe Akpan	England	DF	2024	0	0	1	0	
Lucas Martinez	England	MF	2024	0	0	1	0	
Killian Barrett	Republic of Ireland	GK	2025	9	0	11	0	
Michael Adu-Poku	England	FW	2025	7	0	7	0	
Jay Bird	England	FW	2025	9	4	11	6	
Jack Kingdon	Scotland	DF	2025	16	0	17	0	
Bryce Hosannah	England	DF	2025-2026	5	0	8	0	
Liam Humbles	England	MF	2025	1	0	6	0	
Anthony Gomez-Mancini	France	MF	2025-2026	3	0	8	1	
David Tutonda	DRC	DF	2025-2026	10	0	15	0	
Tom Myles	England	GK	2025-2026	1	0	7	0	
Jack Griffiths	England	MF	2025	1	0	4	0	
Levi Amantchi	England	FW	2025-2026	14	0	20	2	
Kevin Berkoe	England	DF	2025-2026	9	0	12	0	
Jackson Smith	England	GK	2025	0	0	1	0	
Ryan Galvin	England	DF	2025-2026	4	0	5	0	
Nathan Broome	England	GK	2025-2026	4	0	4	0	
Charlie Waller	England	DF	2025-2026	3	0	4	0	
Bryant Bilongo	England	DF	2026-	3	0	3	0	
Manny Duku	Netherlands	FW	2026	3	1	3	1	
Ed Francis	England	MF	2026-	12	0	13	0	
Luke Hannant	England	MF	2026-	8	2	10	2	
Ben Winterbottom	England	GK	2026	2	0	2	0	
John-Kymani Gordon	England	MF	2026	4	0	4	0	
