= 1918–19 Liverpool F.C. season =

English football club season

Liverpool F.C
1918–19 season
- Manager: George Patterson
- Stadium: Anfield
- Top goalscorer: Harry Lewis (19)

The 1918–19 Liverpool F.C. season saw Liverpool compete in the wartime football league, which was set up following the outbreak of World War I. They competed in the Lancashire Section Principle Tournament and the Lancashire Section Supplementary Competition.

== Squad statistics ==
=== Appearances and goals ===
No.	Pos	Nat	Player	Total		Principle		Supplementary	
No.	Pos	Nat	Player	Apps	Goals	Apps	Goals	Apps	Goals
	DF	(England) ENG	Jack Bamber	37	2	29	1	8	1
	MF	(England) ENG	Thomas Bennett	11	10	11	10	0	0
	MF	(England) ENG	Richard Birchall	1	0	1	0	0	0
	MF	(England) ENG	Tom Bromilow	1	0	0	0	1	0
	GK	(Scotland) SCO	Kenny Campbell	3	0	3	0	0	0
	FW	(England) ENG	Harry Chambers	2	0	0	0	2	0
	MF	(England) ENG	Francis Checkland	1	0	1	0	0	0
	GK	(England) ENG	Billy Connell	6	0	6	0	0	0
	FW	(England) ENG	Benny Cross	2	0	1	0	1	0
	MF	(England) ENG	Dick Forshaw	2	0	0	0	2	0
	FW	(England) ENG	Tommy Green	12	10	12	10	0	0
	DF	(England) ENG	William Jenkinson	36	0	28	0	8	0
	FW	(England) ENG	Harry Lewis	38	19	30	16	8	3
	DF	(England) ENG	Ephraim Longworth	23	1	18	1	5	0
	DF	(Scotland) SCO	Donald McKinlay	37	9	29	7	8	2
	FW	(Wales) WAL	Billy Matthews	13	8	11	7	2	1
	MF	(Scotland) SCO	John McTavish	1	0	1	0	0	0
	FW	(England) ENG	Arthur Metcalf	18	8	17	7	1	1
	MF	(Scotland) SCO	John Miller	21	12	14	8	7	4
	FW	(England) ENG	Arthur Newman	1	0	0	0	1	0
	DF	(England) ENG	John Page	2	0	1	0	1	0
	FW	(England) ENG	Tom Page	1	2	1	2	0	0
	(unknown)		W. Patterson	1	0	1	0	0	0
	MF	(England) ENG	Albert Pearson	9	1	2	0	7	1
	DF	(Scotland) SCO	James Penman	1	0	0	0	1	0
	DF	(England) ENG	Reg Phillips	4	1	3	1	1	0
	MF	(England) ENG	Alex Robertson	6	0	6	0	0	0
	FW	(England) ENG	George Schofield	18	0	18	0	0	0
	GK	(Ireland) EIR	Billy Scott	29	0	21	0	8	0
	MF	(England) ENG	Sam Speakman	12	0	11	0	1	0
	MF	(England) ENG	Harold Wadsworth	35	12	28	9	7	3
	DF	(England) ENG	Walter Wadsworth	34	2	26	1	8	1
