= 1916–17 Liverpool F.C. season =

English football club season

Liverpool F.C
1916–17 season
- Manager: Committee
- Stadium: Anfield
- Top goalscorer: Thomas Bennett (19)

The 1916–17 Liverpool F.C. season saw Liverpool compete in the wartime football league, which was set up following the outbreak of World War I. They competed in the Lancashire Section Principle Tournament and the Lancashire Section Supplementary Competition.

== Squad statistics ==
=== Appearances and goals ===
No.	Pos	Nat	Player	Total		Principle		Supplementary	
No.	Pos	Nat	Player	Apps	Goals	Apps	Goals	Apps	Goals
	GK	(England) ENG	Jimmy Ashcroft	5	0	5	0	0	0
	DF	(England) ENG	Jack Bamber	31	4	26	4	5	0
	MF	(England) ENG	Stephen Beattie	1	0	1	0	0	0
	MF	(England) ENG	Thomas Bennett	24	19	20	17	4	2
	DF	(England) ENG	Norman Bradley	14	1	11	1	3	0
	GK	(England) ENG	Joe Butler	4	0	4	0	0	0
	GK	(Scotland) SCO	Kenny Campbell	9	0	8	0	1	0
	GK	(England) ENG	Thomas Capper	1	0	1	0	0	0
	MF	(England) ENG	Tommy Cunliffe	35	1	29	1	6	0
	FW	(Wales) WAL	Frank Curtis	2	0	2	0	0	0
	MF	(Scotland) SCO	Joe Donnachie	3	0	3	0	0	0
	DF	(England) ENG	Horace Fairhurst	1	0	0	0	1	0
	FW	(England) ENG	Arthur Gee	1	0	1	0	0	0
	MF	(England) ENG	Arthur Goddard	22	3	18	2	4	1
	(unknown)		Jack Hannaway	1	0	1	0	0	0
	FW	(England) ENG	James Henderson	2	0	2	0	0	0
	GK		Joseph Houghton	7	0	2	0	5	0
	DF	(England) ENG	William Jenkinson	4	0	4	0	0	0
	FW	(England) ENG	Joe Lees	1	0	0	0	1	0
	FW	(England) ENG	Harry Lewis	28	12	24	10	4	2
	DF	(England) ENG	Ephraim Longworth	34	1	28	1	6	0
	MF	(England) ENG	Harry Lowe	1	0	0	0	1	0
	DF	(England) ENG	Tommy Lucas	29	0	24	0	5	0
	DF	(Scotland) SCO	Donald McKinlay	35	6	29	2	6	4
	FW	(England) ENG	Arthur Metcalf	28	12	24	11	4	1
	MF	(England) ENG	Billy Murphy	2	0	1	0	1	0
	(unknown)		Frederick Osborne	1	0	1	0	0	0
	FW	(England) ENG	Tom Page	2	0	1	0	1	0
	FW	(England) ENG	Fred Pagnam	14	13	12	10	2	3
	FW	(England) ENG	Ernie Pinkney	4	0	4	0	0	0
	DF	(England) ENG	Clem Rigg	1	0	1	0	0	0
	DF	(England) ENG	Sam Speakman	3	0	3	0	0	0
	DF	(England) ENG	Jimmy Stansfield	1	0	1	0	0	0
	GK	(England) ENG	Charles Sutcliffe	1	0	1	0	0	0
	GK		John Swann	3	0	3	0	0	0
	GK	(England) ENG	Ted Taylor	8	0	8	0	0	0
	DF	(England) ENG	Walter Wadsworth	30	2	24	2	6	0
	(unknown)		Robert Waine	1	0	1	0	0	0
	(unknown)		Wilfred Watson	1	0	1	0	0	0
	(unknown)		Owen Williams	1	0	1	0	0	0
