= 1917–18 Liverpool F.C. season =

English football club season

Liverpool F.C
1917–18 season
- Manager: Committee
- Stadium: Anfield
- Top goalscorer: Thomas Bennett (48)

The 1917–18 Liverpool F.C. season saw Liverpool compete in the wartime football league, which was set up following the outbreak of World War I. They competed in the Lancashire Section Principle Tournament and the Lancashire Section Supplementary Competition.

== Squad statistics ==
=== Appearances and goals ===
| No. | Pos | Nat | Player | Total | | Principle | | Supplementary | |
| No. | Pos | Nat | Player | Apps | Goals | Apps | Goals | Apps | Goals |
|---|---|---|---|---|---|---|---|---|---|
| | DF | (England) ENG | Jack Bamber | 36 | 2 | 30 | 2 | 6 | 0 |
| | MF | (England) ENG | Thomas Bennett | 35 | 48 | 29 | 41 | 6 | 7 |
| | MF | (England) ENG | Richard Birchall | 1 | 0 | 0 | 0 | 1 | 0 |
| | GK | (England) ENG | Joe Butler | 2 | 0 | 2 | 0 | 0 | 0 |
| | GK | (Scotland) SCO | Kenny Campbell | 14 | 0 | 13 | 0 | 1 | 0 |
| | GK | (England) ENG | Billy Connell | 7 | 0 | 2 | 0 | 5 | 0 |
| | FW | (England) ENG | Benny Cross | 1 | 0 | 1 | 0 | 0 | 0 |
| | MF | (England) ENG | Tommy Cunliffe | 8 | 0 | 8 | 0 | 0 | 0 |
| | MF | (England) ENG | Arthur Goddard | 1 | 1 | 0 | 0 | 1 | 1 |
| | FW | (England) ENG | Tommy Green | 7 | 10 | 2 | 1 | 5 | 9 |
| | DF | (Wales) WAL | Charlie Hayes | 1 | 0 | 0 | 0 | 1 | 0 |
| | MF | (Wales) WAL | Teddy Hughes | 1 | 0 | 1 | 0 | 0 | 0 |
| | GK | | Joseph Houghton | 7 | 0 | 7 | 0 | 0 | 0 |
| | DF | (England) ENG | William Jenkinson | 21 | 0 | 15 | 0 | 6 | 0 |
| | FW | (England) ENG | Harry Lewis | 35 | 26 | 30 | 21 | 5 | 5 |
| | DF | (England) ENG | Ephraim Longworth | 32 | 0 | 28 | 0 | 4 | 0 |
| | (unknown) | | Jack Lovell | 3 | 0 | 3 | 0 | 0 | 0 |
| | DF | (England) ENG | Tommy Lucas | 10 | 0 | 10 | 0 | 0 | 0 |
| | DF | (Scotland) SCO | Donald McKinlay | 35 | 5 | 29 | 5 | 6 | 0 |
| | FW | (England) ENG | Arthur Metcalf | 30 | 17 | 29 | 17 | 1 | 0 |
| | (unknown) | | S Neish | 1 | 0 | 1 | 0 | 0 | 0 |
| | FW | (England) ENG | Tom Page | 3 | 0 | 2 | 0 | 1 | 0 |
| | FW | (England) ENG | Fred Pagnam | 1 | 0 | 1 | 0 | 0 | 0 |
| | DF | (England) ENG | Clem Rigg | 1 | 0 | 1 | 0 | 0 | 0 |
| | MF | (England) ENG | Alex Robertson | 4 | 0 | 0 | 0 | 4 | 0 |
| | FW | (England) ENG | George Schofield | 27 | 4 | 21 | 3 | 6 | 1 |
| | GK | (England) ENG | Walter Smith | 2 | 0 | 2 | 0 | 0 | 0 |
| | DF | (England) ENG | Sam Speakman | 6 | 0 | 5 | 0 | 1 | 0 |
| | MF | (England) ENG | Harold Wadsworth | 1 | 0 | 1 | 0 | 0 | 0 |
| | DF | (England) ENG | Walter Wadsworth | 30 | 3 | 29 | 3 | 1 | 0 |
| | (unknown) | | Robert Waine | 33 | 7 | 28 | 6 | 5 | 1 |
