= 1919–20 Liverpool F.C. season =

English football club season

Liverpool F.C
1919–20 season
- Manager: George Patterson (To December 1919); David Ashworth (From December 1919)
- Stadium: Anfield
- Football League: 4th
- FA Cup: Fourth round
- Top goalscorer: League: Harry Chambers (15); All: Harry Chambers (15)

The 1919–20 Liverpool F.C. season was the 28th season in existence for Liverpool, and the first after World War I.

== Squad statistics ==
=== Appearances and goals ===
No.	Pos	Nat	Player	Total		Division 1		FA Cup	
No.	Pos	Nat	Player	Apps	Goals	Apps	Goals	Apps	Goals
	GK	(England) ENG	Tom Armstrong	1	0	1	0	0	0
	DF	(England) ENG	Jack Bamber	28	1	23	1	5	0
	MF	(England) ENG	Thomas Bennett	1	0	1	0	0	0
	MF	(England) ENG	Tom Bromilow	28	1	23	1	5	0
	GK	(Scotland) SCO	Kenny Campbell	37	0	32	0	5	0
	FW	(England) ENG	Harry Chambers	34	15	34	15	0	0
	MF	(England) ENG	Dick Forshaw	23	7	23	7	0	0
	DF	(England) ENG	William Jenkinson	13	0	13	0	0	0
	FW	(England) ENG	Dick Johnson	1	0	1	0	0	0
	MF	(Ireland) EIR	Billy Lacey	38	5	33	3	5	2
	FW	(England) ENG	Harry Lewis	28	9	23	7	5	2
	DF	(England) ENG	Ephraim Longworth	32	0	27	0	5	0
	MF	(England) ENG	Harry Lowe	5	0	5	0	0	0
	DF	(England) ENG	Tommy Lucas	16	0	16	0	0	0
	FW	(Wales) WAL	Billy Matthews	1	0	1	0	0	0
	DF	(Scotland) SCO	Donald McKinlay	46	4	41	4	5	0
	MF	(Scotland) SCO	Jock McNab	2	0	2	0	0	0
	MF	(Scotland) SCO	John Miller	8	0	8	0	0	0
	FW	(Scotland) SCO	Tom Miller	25	13	20	11	5	2
	FW	(England) ENG	Fred Pagnam	8	4	8	4	0	0
	MF	(England) ENG	Albert Pearson	39	4	34	4	5	0
	DF	(Scotland) SCO	Bob Pursell	2	0	2	0	0	0
	GK	(Ireland) EIR	Elisha Scott	9	0	9	0	0	0
	MF	(England) ENG	Jackie Sheldon	42	3	37	1	5	2
	MF	(England) ENG	Sam Speakman	4	0	4	0	0	0
	MF	(England) ENG	Harold Wadsworth	8	0	8	0	0	0
	DF	(England) ENG	Walter Wadsworth	38	0	33	0	5	0

== Table ==
Pos	Team	Pld	W	D	L	GF	GA	GAv	Pts
2	Burnley	42	21	9	12	65	59	1.102	51
3	Chelsea	42	22	5	15	56	51	1.098	49
4	Liverpool	42	19	10	13	59	44	1.341	48
5	Sunderland	42	22	4	16	72	59	1.220	48
6	Bolton Wanderers	42	19	9	14	72	65	1.108	47

Source: World Football
Rules for classification: 1) Points; 2) Goal average; 3) Goals scored
