= Henry Forster (disambiguation) =

Henry Forster, 1st Baron Forster (1866–1936) was a British politician in Australia.

Henry Forster may also refer to:

- Henry Forster (MP for Leicester) (fl. 1414–1421), MP for Leicester (UK Parliament constituency)
- Henry Forster (footballer) (c. 1883–?), English footballer
- Henry Pitts Forster (1766?–1815), English orientalist and East India Company civil servant

== See also ==
- Henry Foster (disambiguation)
