= Hugh Cameron =

Hugh Cameron may refer to:

- Hugh Cameron (politician) (1836–1918), Canadian politician
- Hugh Cameron (Rochdale footballer), played for Rochdale in 1921–22 season
- Hugh Cameron (footballer, born 1927) (1927–2009), Scottish professional footballer
- Hugh Cameron (cyclist), British racing cyclist
- Hugh Cameron (artist) (1835–1918), Scottish artist
- Hugh Cameron (boxer), Scottish boxer
