= Joe Sheehan =

Joe or Joseph Sheehan may refer to:

- Joe Sheehan (footballer) (1892-1978), English footballer
- Joe Sheehan (politician) (born 1957), American educator and Democratic politician
- Joe Sheehan (journalist) (born 1971)
- Joe Sheehan (artist) (born 1976), New Zealand stone artist and jeweller
- Joseph Sheehan, professor, see Stuttering
