= Geoffrey Lees =

Geoffrey Lees is the name of:

- Geoffrey Lees (cricketer) (1920–2012), English cricketer
- Geoff Lees (footballer) (1933–2019), English footballer
- Geoff Lees (racing driver) (born 1951), English racing driver
