= George Schofield (disambiguation) =

George Schofield may refer to:

- George W. Schofield (1833-1882), American Union brevet brigadier general
- George A. Schofield (1863-1944), American politician
- George Schofield (1893-1961), English footballer
