= Harry Foster =

Harry Foster may refer to:

- Harry Foster (cricketer) (1873–1950), real name Henry, cricketer who played for Oxford University and Worcestershire
- Sir Harry Foster (politician) (1855–1938), British Conservative Party politician, Member of Parliament 1892–1900, 1910, 1924–1929
- Harry C. Foster (1871–1917), American politician
- Harry Wickwire Foster (1902–1964), Canadian World War II general
- Harry Foster (footballer) (1898–1980), English footballer

== See also ==
- Harold Foster (disambiguation)
- Henry Foster (disambiguation)
