= David Mossman =

David Mossman may refer to:

- Dave Mossman (born 1964), English footballer
- David James Mossman (1926–1971), British journalist, broadcaster and MI6 agent
