= Harry Fearnley =

Harry Fearnley may refer to:

- Harry Fearnley (footballer, born 1923) (1923–2012), English footballer for Leeds United and Newport County
- Harry Fearnley (footballer, born 1935) (1935–2013), football goalkeeper for Huddersfield Town, Oxford United and Doncaster Rovers
