= Ndiwa =

Ndiwa is a surname. Notable people with the surname include:

- Juma Ndiwa (born 1960), Kenyan middle-distance runner
- Kangana Ndiwa (born 1984), Congolese footballer
- Stacey Chepkemboi Ndiwa (born 1992), Kenyan long-distance runner
