= William Sneyd =

William Sneyd may refer to:

- William Sneyd (MP for Staffordshire) (c. 1614–1695), English politician
- William Sneyd (MP for Lichfield) (c. 1693–1745), English politician
- William Sneyd (footballer) (1895-1985), English footballer
