= Frank Curtis =

Welsh footballer

Personal information
- Full name: Frank Curtis
- Date of birth: 12 November 1890
- Place of birth: Llanelli, Wales
- Date of death: 1957 (aged 66–67)
- Position: Forward

Senior career*
Years	Team	Apps	(Gls)
- South Liverpool
1909–1911	West Ham United	6	(4)
19xx–1914	Llanelly		
1914–1920	Wolverhampton Wanderers	40	(25)
1920–1921	Reading	1	(0)
- Bilston United
- Kidderminster Harriers
- * Club domestic league appearances and goals

Frank Curtis (12 November 1890 – 1957) was a Welsh footballer who played in the Southern League for West Ham United, and in the Football League for Wolverhampton Wanderers and Reading.

== Career ==
Curtis played in the Southern League Division One for West Ham United, making three appearances during the 1909–10 season and a further three in 1910–11.

Curtis joined Wolverhampton Wanderers in June 1914 from his hometown club Llanelly. He made his league debut on 1 September 1914 in a 1–1 draw at Clapham Orient and ended the season as Wolves' leading goalscorer with 25 goals.

The outbreak of the First World War halted his league career for four years, and he made just three further appearances for the club afterward. He left to join Reading, newly elected to the Football League, in Summer 1920.

He later served non-league Bilston United and Kidderminster Harriers before retiring to work in engineering in his native South Wales.

== Bibliography ==
- Matthews, Tony (2001). The Wolves Who's Who. West Midlands: Britespot. ISBN 1-904103-01-4.
