= Harold Foster =

Harold Foster may refer to:

- Hal Foster (1892–1982), cartoonist
- Hal Foster (art critic) (born 1955), university professor and art critic
- Harold E. Foster (1906–1996), basketball player and coach
- Harold D. Foster (1943–2009), Canadian geographer and geomorphologist

== See also ==
- Harry Foster (disambiguation)
