= Gene Carney =

English footballer

Personal information
- Full name: Eugene Carney
- Date of birth: 1895
- Place of birth: Bootle, England
- Date of death: 1952 (aged 56–57)
- Height: 5 ft 8 in (1.73 m)
- Position: Outside left

Senior career*
Years	Team	Apps	(Gls)
1912–1915	Everton	0	(0)
1919–1920	South Liverpool		
1920–1921	Pontypridd		
1921–1922	Rochdale	10	(6)
1922–1923	New Brighton		
1923	Reading	23	(0)
1923–1924	Mold Town		
1924–1925	New Brighton	33	(1)
1925	Caernarvon Athletic		
1925–1926	New Brighton	13	(2)
1926–1928	Caernarvon Athletic		
1928–1929	St James CYMS		
- Sandbach Ramblers
- * Club domestic league appearances and goals

Eugene Carney (1895–1952) was an English professional footballer who played as an outside left in the Football League for New Brighton, Reading and Rochdale.

== Personal life ==
Carney served as a lance corporal in the King's Regiment (Liverpool) and the Royal Welch Fusiliers during the First World War.

== Career statistics ==
Appearances and goals by club, season and competition
Club	Season	League			FA Cup		Other		Total	
Club	Season	Division	Apps	Goals	Apps	Goals	Apps	Goals	Apps	Goals
Rochdale	1921–22	Third Division North	10	6	0	0	1 (Note: Appearance in Lancashire Senior Cup)	0	11	6
Career total			10	6	0	0	1	0	11	6
