= Henry Foster =

Henry Foster may refer to:

== Politicians ==
- Henry A. Foster (1800–1889), American politician from New York
- Henry Donnel Foster (1808–1880), American politician from Pennsylvania
- Henry Foster (Australian politician) (1846–1902), Australian politician for electoral district of Gippsland East

== Characters ==
- Henry Foster, a character from Aldous Huxley's novel Brave New World
- Henry Foster, a former character from the ITV1 soap opera Coronation Street

== Others ==
- Henry Foster (scientist) (1797–1831), British naval officer, explorer and scientist
- Henry Foster (doctor) (1933–2022), failed nominee to the position of Surgeon General of the United States
- Harry Foster (cricketer) (1873–1950), British cricketer, real name: Henry
- Henry Foster (clergyman), founding member of the Eclectic Society
- Henry Foster, founder of Charles River Laboratories and father of the company's current chairman and CEO, James C. Foster

== See also ==
- Henry Foster Adams (1882–1973), psychologist and writer
- Harry Foster (disambiguation)
- Henry Forster (disambiguation)
