= James Henderson (Newcastle United footballer) =

English footballer

Personal information
- Full name: James Henderson
- Place of birth: Newcastle upon Tyne, England
- Height: 5 ft 9 in (1.75 m)
- Position: Inside forward

Senior career*
Years	Team	Apps	(Gls)
- Scotswood
1913–1915	Cardiff City	15	(2)
1919–1920	Newcastle United	6	(1)
- Scotswood
1921	Ashington	1	(0)
- Scotswood
- Spennymoor United
- * Club domestic league appearances and goals

James Henderson was an English professional footballer who played as an inside forward in the Football League for Newcastle United and Ashington.

== Personal life ==
He served as a private in the Lancashire Fusiliers during the First World War.

== Career statistics ==
Appearances and goals by club, season and competition
Club	Season	League			FA Cup		Total	
Club	Season	Division	Apps	Goals	Apps	Goals	Apps	Goals
Cardiff City	1913–14	Southern League First Division	12	2	1	0	13	2
Cardiff City	1914–15	Southern League First Division	3	0	0	0	3	0
Cardiff City	Total		15	2	1	0	16	2
Newcastle United	1919–20	First Division	6	1	0	0	6	1
Career total			21	3	1	0	22	3
