= Geoff Lees (footballer) =

English footballer (1933–2019)

Personal information
- Full name: Geoffrey Lees
- Date of birth: 1 October 1933
- Place of birth: Rotherham, England
- Date of death: 6 June 2019 (aged 85)
- Place of death: Rotherham, England
- Position: Wing half

Senior career*
Years	Team	Apps	(Gls)
1951–1955	Barnsley	0	(0)
1955–1956	Bradford City	3	(0)
Total		3	(0)
- * Club domestic league appearances and goals

Geoffrey Lees (1 October 1933 – 6 June 2019) was an English professional footballer who played as a wing half.

== Career ==
Born in Rotherham, Lees played for Barnsley and Bradford City. During his time with Bradford City he made three appearances in the Football League.

After retiring as a player, Lees worked as a youth coach at Barnsley. He died on 5 June 2019.

His father Joe Lees was also a footballer; both played for Barnsley.

== Sources ==
- Frost, Terry (1988). Bradford City A Complete Record 1903-1988. Breedon Books Sport. ISBN 0-907969-38-0.
