= George Daniels (footballer, born 1898) =

English footballer

Personal information
- Full name: George Daniels
- Date of birth: 7 December 1898
- Place of birth: Chorlton, England
- Date of death: 1995 (aged 96–97)
- Position: Winger

Senior career*
Years	Team	Apps	(Gls)
1914	Altrincham		
1918	Bury		
1919-1920	Preston North End	12	(1)
1920-1921	Bury		
1921-1923	Rochdale	35	(1)
1925	Ellesmere Port Town		
Total		47	(2)
- * Club domestic league appearances and goals

George Daniels (7 December 1898 – 1995) was an English footballer who played for Preston North End and Rochdale.
