= Jack Hill (footballer, born 1895) =

English footballer

Personal information
- Full name: John William Hill
- Date of birth: 1895
- Place of birth: Rochdale, England
- Position: Wing-half

Senior career*
Years	Team	Apps	(Gls)
1914	Bright's		
1921-1923	Rochdale	43	(11)
1923	Bacup Borough		
Total		43	(11)
- * Club domestic league appearances and goals

John William Hill (born 1895) was an English footballer who played for Rochdale when they joined the English Football League in 1921.

He also played for Bright's and Bacup Borough.
