= Henry Forster (footballer) =

English footballer

Senior career*
Years	Team	Apps	(Gls)
1907–1911	Sunderland	103	(0)
- * Club domestic league appearances and goals

Henry Forster (born c. 1883) was an English footballer who played for Sunderland as a defender. He made his debut for Sunderland against Sheffield United on 9 February 1907 in a 3–2 defeat at Bramall Lane. In total, Forster made 103 appearances for Sunderland without scoring.
