= Joe Reid (footballer) =

English footballer (1896–1936)

Personal information
- Full name: Joseph Edmund Reid
- Date of birth: 30 June 1896
- Place of birth: Hebburn, England
- Date of death: 1936 (aged 39–40)
- Position: Full back

Senior career*
Years	Team	Apps	(Gls)
1914–1918	Hebburn Argyle		
1918–1919	South Shields		
1919–1920	Manchester City	3	(1)
1920–1926	Stockport County	145	(1)
1926–1927	Carlisle United		
1927–1928	Boston Town		
1928–1930	Newport County	61	(1)
1930–1931	Fulham	7	(0)
1931	Annfield Plain		
Total		216	(3)
- * Club domestic league appearances and goals

Joseph Edmund Reid (30 June 1896 – 1936) was an English footballer who played in the Football League for Fulham, Manchester City, Newport County and Stockport County.
