= Henry Pitts Forster =

- Born: 1766?
- Died: 10 September 1815 (aged 49)
- Occupations: Orientalist, writer

Henry Pitts Forster (1766?–1815) was an orientalist. He entered the Bengal service of the East India Company 7 August 1783, became collector of Tipperah in 1793, and registrar of Diwani Adalat of the 24 Parganas in 1794.

To Forster belongs the credit of publishing the first English work of lexicography for the Bengali language. The first part of this book, the 'English and Bengalee [sic.] Vocabulary,’ appeared at Calcutta in 1799. It is evident, from the lengthy preface to this work, that it was undertaken on political and practical, as well as on literary, grounds. Bengali at this time was, officially at least, an unrecognized vernacular, and Forster rightly insists on the absurdity and inconvenience of continuing to use Persian in courts of law. It was thus due to the efforts of Forster, seconded among Europeans by Carey, Marshman, and the other Serampur missionaries, and among the natives by Rāmamohan Ray and his friends, that Bengali not only has become the official language of the presidency, but now ranks as the most prolific literary language of India. The second volume appeared in 1802.

Meanwhile, Forster was also directing his attention to Sanskrit. We find from the advertisement of the 'Bengali Vocabulary,’ appearing in the Calcutta Gazette 26 August 1802, that he had then finished and proposed to publish an 'Essay on the Principles of Sanskrit Grammar,’ and as a sequel the text and translation of a native grammar, the Mugdhabodha of Vopadeva. The latter work seems not to have been published, as no trace of it is to be found in the ordinary bibliographical works on the subject. The essay finally appeared in 1810, and from its preface we learn that it was submitted in manuscript to the College Council in 1804, at which time "none of the elaborate works on Sanskrit by Mr. Colebrooke, Mr. Carey, or Mr. Wilkins had made their appearance." It is a laborious work, not, indeed, calculated to attract students to the pursuit of oriental learning, but abounding in tabular and statistical information, founded on the intricate and often merely theoretical lucubrations of the ancient native schools of grammar.

In 1803–1804 Forster was employed at the Calcutta Mint, of which he rose to be master. In 1815 he was 'nominated to sign stamp paper.'

He died in India on 10 September 1815.
