= Thomas Armstrong (footballer) =

English footballer (1898–1967)

Personal information
- Full name: Thomas Armstrong
- Date of birth: 1898
- Place of birth: Preston, England
- Date of death: 1967 (aged 68–69)
- Position: Goalkeeper

Senior career*
| Years | Team | Apps | (Gls) |
| 1919–1920 | Liverpool | 1 | (0) |
| 1921 | Preston North End | 0 | (0) |
- * Club domestic league appearances and goals

Thomas Armstrong (1898–1967) was a footballer who played in The Football League for Liverpool. He also played for Preston North End.
