= James Miller (1920s footballer) =

Scottish footballer

Personal information
- Full name: James Miller
- Place of birth: Greenock, Scotland
- Height: 5 ft 7 in (1.70 m)
- Position: Inside forward

Senior career*
Years	Team	Apps	(Gls)
- Blantyre Victoria
1917–1919	St Mirren	13	(4)
1919	Hamilton Academical	7	(3)
1919–1920	Queens Park Rangers	2	(0)
1920	Abertillery Town		
1920	St Mirren Juniors		
1920–1921	Morton	10	(3)
1921–1924	Grimsby Town	89	(32)
1924	Manchester United	4	(1)
1924–1925	York City	38	(18)
1925–1927	Boston Town		
1927–?	Shirebrook		
- Port Glasgow Athletic Juniors
- * Club domestic league appearances and goals

James Miller was a Scottish footballer who played as an inside forward.

Miller played for Blantyre Victoria, Hamilton Academical, Queens Park Rangers, St Mirren, Morton, Grimsby Town, Manchester United, York City, Boston Town and Shirebrook.
