= Reg Phillips (footballer, born 1900) =

English footballer

Personal information
- Full name: Reginald Phillips
- Date of birth: c. 1900
- Place of birth: Hove, England
- Date of death: March 1924 (aged 23)
- Place of death: Hove, England
- Height: 6 ft 0 in (1.83 m)
- Position: Full back

Senior career*
Years	Team	Apps	(Gls)
191?–1920	Brighton & Hove Amateurs		
1920–1923	Brighton & Hove Albion	3	(0)
- * Club domestic league appearances and goals

Reginald Phillips (c. 1900 – March 1924) was an English professional footballer who played primarily as a full back, but made three Football League Third Division South appearances for Brighton & Hove Albion at outside left.

Phillips was born in Hove, Sussex, in around 1900. He played for Brighton & Hove Amateurs during and after the First World War, and turned professional with Albion in 1920. He was a member of their reserve team that won the 1920–21 Southern League title, and made his debut in the Football League in September 1921. Illness put an end to his football career during the following season, and he died in Hove in March 1924 at the age of 23. Albion's reserves played a benefit match against Southampton in support of his family.
