= Hugh Cameron (footballer, born 1927) =

Scottish footballer

Personal information
- Full name: Hugh Gibson Cameron
- Date of birth: 1 February 1927
- Place of birth: Blantyre, Scotland
- Date of death: 9 December 2009 (aged 82)
- Place of death: Wishaw, Scotland
- Position: Left winger

Youth career
- Burnbank Athletic

Senior career*
Years	Team	Apps	(Gls)
1946–1948	Clyde	13	(2)
1948–1951	Torquay United	120	(17)
1951–1952	Newcastle United	2	(0)
1952–1953	Bury	29	(1)
1953–1956	Workington	54	(4)
1956	St Mirren	1	(0)
Total		219	(24)
- * Club domestic league appearances and goals

Hugh Gibson Cameron (1 February 1927 – 9 December 2009) was a Scottish professional footballer, playing as a left winger. He was born Blantyre, South Lanarkshire.

Hugh Cameron began his professional career with Clyde who he joined from Burnbank Athletic. In May 1948 he moved to Torquay United. He settled in quickly at Plainmoor, and played impressively enough to earn a £4,500 move to Newcastle United in April 1951. He had played 120 league games, scoring 17 times for the Gulls. He found it hard to establish himself on Tyneside, playing only twice before a £500 move to Second Division strugglers Bury. He scored once in 29 league games for the Shakers before moving on again, this time to Workington in November 1953. He played 54 league games for Workington, scoring 4 times before returning to Scotland to play for St Mirren.
