= Francis Checkland =

English footballer

Francis Checkland (31 July 1895 – 19 June 1960) was an English footballer who played as a defender.
