= Arthur Hinchliffe =

English footballer (1897–1960)

Personal information
- Date of birth: 26 August 1897
- Place of birth: Bolton, England
- Date of death: 1960 (aged 62–63)
- Position: Wing-half

Senior career*
| Years | Team | Apps | (Gls) |
| 1922-1923 | Rochdale | 26 | (0) |
| Total | | 26 | (0) |
- * Club domestic league appearances and goals

Arthur Hinchliffe (26 August 1897 – 1960) was an English footballer who played as a wing-half for Rochdale.
