= Kangana Ndiwa =

Congolese international football player (born 1984)

Personal information
- Full name: Kangana Lord Savimbi Ndiwa
- Date of birth: 28 February 1984 (age 42)
- Place of birth: Maquela do Zombo, Angola
- Height: 1.92 m (6 ft 4 in)
- Position: Defender

Senior career*
Years	Team	Apps	(Gls)
–2003	Djurgårdens IF	0	(0)
2002	→ Värtans IK (loan)	16	(0)
2003–2004	Bolton Wanderers	0	(0)
2003	→ Oldham Athletic (loan)	4	(0)
2004	→ Rochdale (loan)	1	(0)
2004–2005	Stalybridge Celtic	1	(0)
2005–2006	Drava Ptuj	0	(0)
2006?	Worthing	1	(0)
2006	Montrose	1	(0)
2007	Wealdstone	3	(0)
2008	Hednesford Town	0	(0)
2008	Radcliffe Borough	0	(0)
2008–2009	AFC Liverpool	1	(1)

International career^{‡}
2004	Sweden U17	20	(2)
2004	Sweden U19	9	(1)
2004	DR Congo	2	(0)
- * Club domestic league appearances and goals as of 12:12, 28 September 2008 (BST) ‡ National team caps and goals as of 12:12, 28 September 2008 (BST)

Kangana Lord Savimbi Ndiwa (born 28 February 1984) is a Congolese former international football player who played professionally for clubs in England, Sweden and Slovenia, as well as semi-professional football in England, Scotland and Sweden. He played as a defender.

== Early life ==
Ndiwa was born on 28 February 1984 in Maquela do Zombo, Angola. He moved to Sweden at the age of seven and gained dual Swedish-Congolese nationality.

== Club career ==
=== Sweden ===
He played for Swedish club Djurgårdens IF, who in 2002 sent him out to Värtans IK to gain match experience. In 2003, he attended three trials at Scottish club Celtic as well as a trial with French team Rennes.

=== League football in England ===
He went on trial with Bolton Wanderers and was due to move in November 2002 until the move fell through. He did eventually sign for the club on 31 January 2003 on an eighteen-month contract. He was a part of the team's squad between June 2003 and May 2004, but never played first team football. During his contract he went out on loan twice. He went firstly to Oldham Athletic where he was given the number 5 shirt. He made his Football League debut for the club against Brighton on 9 August 2003 and went on to make four appearances in total before returning to Bolton.

He followed this up with a loan to Rochdale where he made one appearance as an 86th-minute substitute against Mansfield Town on 7 February 2004.

He was released by Bolton at the end of his contract.

After his time at Bolton he went on trial at Macclesfield Town in November 2004, where he played in a reserves match against Manchester United, and Queens Park Rangers. He registered with Stalybridge Celtic, and played one game for them on 1 January 2005 against Southport.

=== Slovenia ===
In 2005, he spent some time in Slovenia as a squad member for NK Drava Ptuj being named as an unused substitute on a number of occasions.

=== Scotland ===
On his return to the United Kingdom, he went on trial at Scarborough in January 2006, and then Reading where he was not offered a contract.

He then played for non-league Worthing in pre-season games, but played just once at the beginning of their 2006–07 Isthmian League season when was substituted with his team 5–0 down, with his manager commenting:

"Ndiwa looked all over the shop and said he felt sick. Not half as sick as I was feeling. He'd played well at Bognor and against Bashley."

— Danny Bloor

In November 2006 he moved to Scottish side Montrose on an amateur contract, playing his sole match for them in the Scottish League on 25 November 2006 in a defeat to East Fife. He was released by the club in late December.

=== Non-league football in England ===
He then went on trial at Dutch club MVV Maastricht in February 2007 before joining Wealdstone where he played in three first team matches. Another trial period followed, this time at Stoke City in April and May 2007 where he made three appearances for the reserves, scoring once. He also appeared for the Stoke first team in their first pre-season friendly in July 2007.

In early February 2008 a proposed move to Hucknall Town fell through after problems occurred in obtaining international clearance and instead he joined Hednesford Town and was an unused substitute for a match against Lincoln United. The following month he went to Hungarian club Ferencvárosi TC for a prolonged try-out but was not awarded a contract.

In the 2008–09 pre-season he trained with Northern Premier League side Radcliffe Borough and played in at least one friendly for them.

He registered with AFC Liverpool in September 2008. His debut for the club came on 11 October 2008 as a late substitute against Holker Old Boys in the North West Counties League Cup where AFC cruised to a comfortable 4–0 win. In his second match for the club he scored twice, as they beat Eccleshall 4–1 in the second round of the same trophy He then scored on his league debut against Stone Dominoes before having to leave the match injured. After spending some time out with the injury, he left the club having made three appearances and scored three goals.

In November and December 2009 he went on trial with Football League Two side Lincoln City where he played for the reserves twice, but again was not awarded a contract.

== International career ==
=== Sweden ===
Ndwia represented the Sweden U17 and U19 teams a total of 29 times, scoring three goals.

=== Democratic Republic of Congo ===
He took advantage of a rule change by UEFA to allow him to represent the Democratic Republic of Congo at full international level. He was part of the Congolese 2004 African Nations Cup team, who finished bottom of their group in the first round of competition, thus failing to secure qualification for the quarter-finals. He appeared as a late substitute in the first Democratic Republic of Congo game of the tournament, a 2–1 defeat to Guinea. He made a second appearance for the national side in a preliminary qualifying match for the 2008 World Cup when Uganda defeated Congo 1–0 in June 2004 in front of 45,000 spectators.
