= Dave Mossman =

English footballer

Personal information
- Full name: David John Mossman
- Date of birth: 27 July 1964 (age 62)
- Place of birth: Sheffield, England
- Height: 6 ft 1 in (1.85 m)
- Position: Winger

Youth career
- –: Sheffield Wednesday

Senior career*
Years	Team	Apps	(Gls)
198?–1986	Sheffield Wednesday	0	(0)
1985	→ Bradford City (loan)	4	(0)
1985	→ Stockport County (loan)	9	(5)
1986	Rochdale	8	(0)
1986–1987	Stockport County	30	(1)
1987–1988	Lincoln City	21	(2)
1988–1991	Boston United	46	(5)
Total		118	(13)
- * Club domestic league appearances and goals

David John Mossman (born 27 July 1964) is an English former footballer who made 51 appearances in the Football League playing for Bradford City, Stockport County (in two spells) and Rochdale. He played as a winger. He began his career with hometown club Sheffield Wednesday without playing first-team football for them and went on to play in the Football Conference, for Lincoln City as they won the 1987–88 title, and for Boston United.
