= Arthur Collinge =

English footballer

Personal information
- Full name: Arthur Collinge
- Date of birth: 28 July 1897
- Place of birth: Rochdale, England
- Date of death: 1971 (aged 73–74)
- Height: 5 ft 8 in (1.73 m)
- Position: Inside forward

Senior career*
Years	Team	Apps	(Gls)
1920	Rochdale Tradesmen		
1921-1922	Rochdale	10	(1)
1922	Rochdale Tradesmen		
1927	British Dyestuffs		
Total		10	(1)
- * Club domestic league appearances and goals

Arthur Collinge (28 July 1897 – 1971) was an English footballer who played for Rochdale when they joined the Football League in 1921.
