= Joe Lees =

English footballer

Personal information
- Date of birth: q1 1892
- Place of birth: Coalville, Leicestershire, England
- Date of death: 26 July 1933 (aged 41)
- Height: 5 ft 8 1/2 in (1.74 m)
- Position: Inside forward

Senior career*
Years	Team	Apps	(Gls)
–	Coalville PSA		
1911–1913	Whitwick Imperial		
1913–1919	Barnsley	10	(2)
1919–1921	Rotherham County	53	(19)
1921–1923	Lincoln City	33	(9)
1923–1924	Guildford United		
1924	Halifax Town	5	(1)
1924–1925	Scunthorpe & Lindsey United		
1925	Newport County	0	(0)
1925–19??	Wombwell		
–	Shirebrook		
- * Club domestic league appearances and goals

Joseph William D. Lees MM (q1 1892 – 26 July 1933) was an English footballer who scored 31 goals from 92 appearances in the Football League playing for Barnsley, Rotherham County, Lincoln City and Halifax Town. He was a member of Rotherham County's team in their first Football League match, a 2–0 home win against Nottingham Forest on 30 August 1919. He played non-league football for several teams, and was on the books of Newport County without representing them in the league. He played as an inside forward.

Lees served in World War One, winning the Military Medal. His son Geoff was also a footballer; both played for Barnsley.
