= Herbert Clark (footballer) =

English footballer

Personal information
- Full name: Herbert Clark
- Date of birth: 1896
- Place of birth: Sheffield, England
- Position: Full-back

Senior career*
Years	Team	Apps	(Gls)
1913-1914	Sheffield United		
1914	Abertillery		
1915	Distillery		
1916	St Nicholas		
1917	Linfield		
1918	Queen's Island		
1919	Linfield		
1920	Halifax Town		
1921	Rochdale	1	(0)
Total		1	(0)
- * Club domestic league appearances and goals

Herbert Clark (born 1896) was an English footballer who played for Rochdale when they joined the English Football League in 1921. He previously played non-league football for a number of other clubs.
