= Joseph Barnes (footballer) =

English footballer

Personal information
- Full name: Joseph Barnes
- Date of birth: 5 May 1896
- Place of birth: Hyde, England
- Date of death: 1953 (aged 56–57)
- Position: Centre-back

Senior career*
Years	Team	Apps	(Gls)
1921	Rochdale	3	(0)
1922	New Church		
1924	Colwyn Bay F.C.		
1926	Bacup Borough F.C.		
1926	Bangor City		
Total		3	(0)
- * Club domestic league appearances and goals

Joseph Barnes (5 May 1896 – 1953) was an English footballer who played for Rochdale when they joined the English Football League in 1921.
