= Reg Owens =

English footballer (1890–1944)

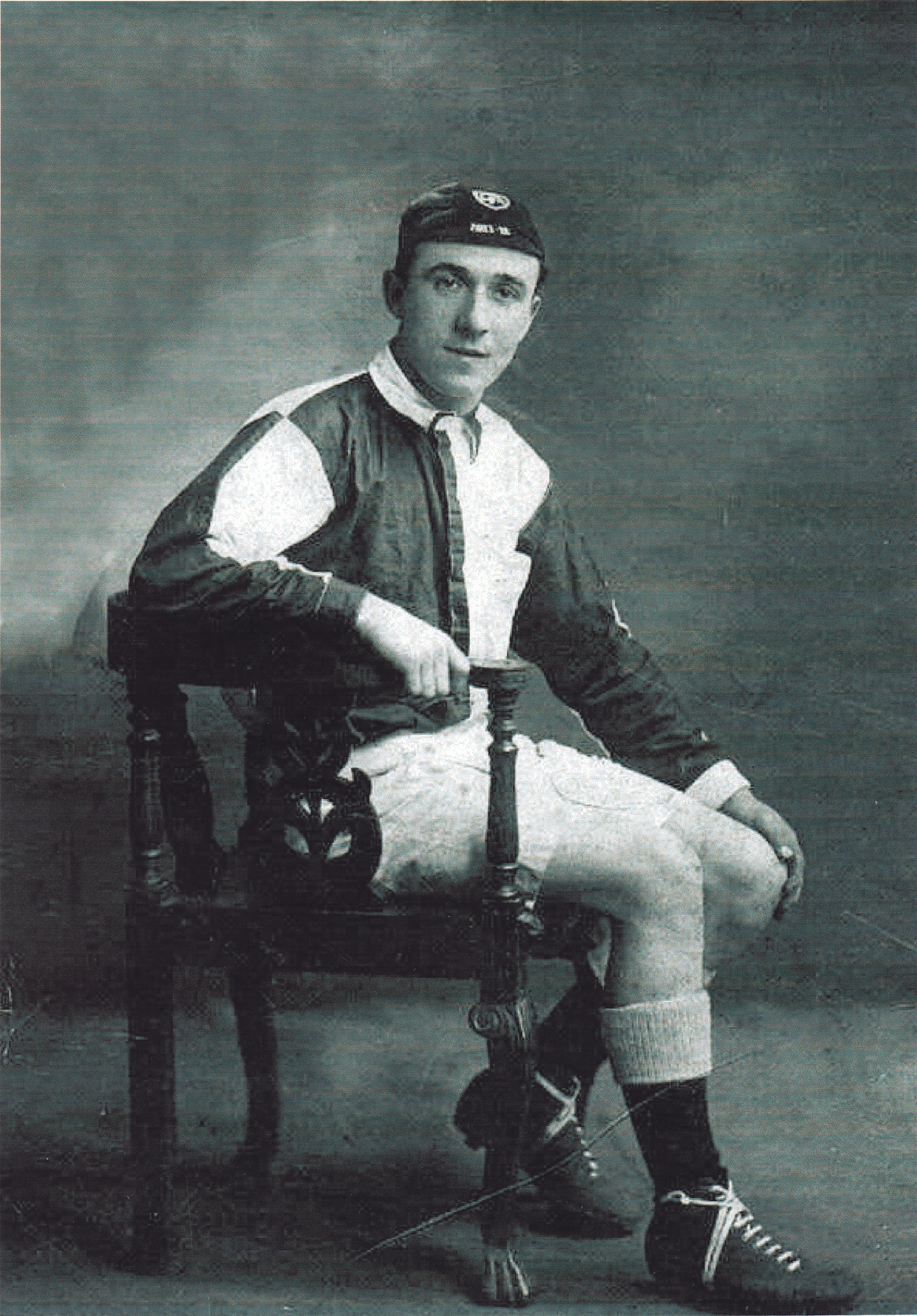

Personal information
- Full name: John Reginald Owens
- Date of birth: 6 February 1890
- Place of birth: Liverpool, England
- Date of death: 23 January 1944 (aged 53)
- Height: 5 ft 9 in (1.75 m)
- Position: Inside forward

Senior career*
Years	Team	Apps	(Gls)
1910	St Cleopa's		
1911	Wallasey Rovers		
1912	Cammell Laird		
1913	Bromborough Pool		
1914	Wallasey Rovers		
1918	Tranmere Rovers		
1920	Pontypridd		
1921—1922	Rochdale	14	(7)
Total		14	(7)
- * Club domestic league appearances and goals

John Reginald Owens (6 February 1890 – 23 January 1944) was an English footballer who played as an inside-forward for Rochdale. In 1921 he became the first ever player to score a hat-trick for Rochdale since they joined the Football League Third Division North.
