= Thomas Catlow =

English footballer (1892–1976)

Personal information
- Date of birth: 24 October 1892
- Place of birth: Blackburn, England
- Date of death: 1976 (aged 83–84)
- Position: Centre-half

Senior career*
Years	Team	Apps	(Gls)
1910	Darwen		
1911	Colne		
1912	Southend United		
1913	Barry		
1919–1920	Stockport County		
1920	Swansea Town	1	(0)
1921	Mid Rhondda United		
1921	Rochdale	1	(0)
Total		2	(0)
- * Club domestic league appearances and goals

Thomas Catlow (24 October 1892 – 1976) was an English footballer who played as a centre-half for Swansea Town and Rochdale, as well as non-league football for other clubs.
