= Albert Wolstencroft =

English footballer

Personal information
- Full name: Albert Wolstencroft
- Date of birth: 5 January 1898
- Place of birth: Middleton
- Date of death: 1984 (aged 85–86)
- Position: Inside forward

Senior career*
Years	Team	Apps	(Gls)
1920	Northwich Victoria		
1921	Rochdale	1	(0)
Total		1	(0)
- * Club domestic league appearances and goals

Albert Wolstencroft (5 January 1898 – 1984) was an English footballer who made one professional appearance for Rochdale when they joined the English Football League in 1921. He previously played for Northwich Victoria.
