= Wilson McGhee =

English footballer (1892–1948)

Personal information
- Full name: Samuel Wilson McGhee
- Date of birth: 2 May 1892
- Place of birth: Maybole, Scotland
- Date of death: 1948 (aged 55–56)
- Position: Winger

Senior career*
Years	Team	Apps	(Gls)
1914	Glasgow University		
1920	Queen's Park		
1921	Rochdale	2	(0)
Total		2	(0)
- * Club domestic league appearances and goals

Samuel Wilson McGhee (2 May 1892 – 1948) was a Scottish footballer who played as a winger for Rochdale.
