= Richard Birchall =

English footballer

Personal information
- Date of birth: 1887
- Place of birth: Prescot, England
- Position: Outside left

Senior career*
Years	Team	Apps	(Gls)
- Newton-le-Willows
- St Helens Town
1910	Bradford City	1	(0)
- Carlisle United
- Hyde
- Norwich City
- Rochdale
1912–1913	Lincoln City	7	(1)
- Worksop Town
- Rotherham Town
- Mexborough Town
Total		8+	(1+)
- * Club domestic league appearances and goals

Richard Birchall (born 1887) was an English professional footballer who played as an outside left.

== Career ==
Born in Prescot, Birchall played for Newton-le-Willows, St Helens Town, Bradford City, Carlisle United, Hyde, Norwich City, Rochdale, Lincoln City, Worksop Town, Rotherham Town and Mexborough Town.

For Bradford City, he made 1 appearance in the Football League. He made a total of 8 appearances in the Football League for Bradford City and Lincoln City.

== Sources ==
- Frost, Terry (1988). Bradford City A Complete Record 1903-1988. Breedon Books Sport. ISBN 0-907969-38-0.
- Joyce, Michael (2004). Football League Players' Records 1888 – 1939. Soccerdata. ISBN 1-899468-67-6.
