= George Hoyle =

English footballer

Personal information
- Full name: George Hoyle
- Date of birth: 20 April 1896
- Place of birth: Rochdale, England
- Date of death: 1977 (aged 80–81)
- Position: Centre-forward

Senior career*
Years	Team	Apps	(Gls)
1920	Sudden Villa		
1922	Rochdale	3	(1)
Total		3	(1)
- * Club domestic league appearances and goals

George Hoyle (20 April 1896 – 1977) was an English footballer who played for Rochdale.
