= Joe Herbert (footballer) =

English footballer (1895–1959)

Personal information
- Full name: Joseph Henry Herbert
- Date of birth: 21 January 1895
- Place of birth: Rotherham, England
- Date of death: 1959 (aged 63–64)
- Position: Winger

Senior career*
Years	Team	Apps	(Gls)
1912	Kimberworth Old Boys		
1913	Rotherham County		
1919	Norwich City		
1920-1921	Swansea Town		
1921-1922	Rochdale	16	(4)
1922	Guildford United		
Total		16	(4)
- * Club domestic league appearances and goals

Joseph Henry Herbert (21 January 1895 – 1959) was an English footballer who played for Rochdale when they joined the English Football League in 1921. He also played non-league football for a number of other clubs..
