= Peter Farrar =

English footballer (1897–1972)

Personal information
- Date of birth: 6 May 1897
- Place of birth: St Helens, England
- Date of death: 1972 (aged 74–75)
- Position: Wing-half

Senior career*
Years	Team	Apps	(Gls)
1914	St Helens Town		
1919	Prescot Cables		
1920	Everton	0	(0)
1921-1922	Rochdale	12	(0)
Total		12	(0)
- * Club domestic league appearances and goals

Peter Farrar (6 May 1897 – 1972) was an English footballer who played as a wing-half for Rochdale when they joined the English Football League in 1921.
