= Jock Burns =

Scottish footballer (1894–1963)

Personal information
- Full name: Hugh Burns
- Place of birth: Bonhill, Scotland
- Date of death: 1963 (aged 68–69)
- Position: Centre-half

Senior career*
Years	Team	Apps	(Gls)
1914	Renton Glencairn		
1915	St Anthony's		
1916	Dumbarton Harp		
1917	Rutherglen Glencairn		
1918	Dumbarton	9	(0)
1919	Renton		
1921–1922	Rochdale	15	(0)
1922	East Stirlingshire		
1924–1925	Oldham Athletic		
- * Club domestic league appearances and goals

Hugh Burns (20 December 1894 – 1963) was a Scottish footballer who played as a centre-half for several clubs, including Rochdale and Dumbarton.
