= Bob Sandiford =

English footballer

Personal information
- Full name: Robert Sandiford
- Date of birth: 12 August 1900
- Place of birth: Rochdale, England
- Date of death: 1967 (aged 66–67)
- Height: 5 ft 8 in (1.73 m)
- Position: Inside forward

Senior career*
Years	Team	Apps	(Gls)
1920	Rochdale St Peter's		
1921–1922	Rochdale	12	(2)
1922–1923	Bacup Borough		
1923–1925	Rochdale	4	(2)
1925	York City		
1925	Bacup Borough		
1926	Stalybridge Celtic		
Total		16	(4)
- * Club domestic league appearances and goals

Robert Sandiford (12 August 1900 – 1967) was an English footballer who played for Rochdale when they joined the Football League in 1921.
