= Harry Fearnley (footballer, born 1923) =

English footballer

Personal information
- Date of birth: 27 May 1923
- Place of birth: Dewsbury, England
- Date of death: 6 January 2012 (aged 88)
- Place of death: Morley, England
- Position: Goalkeeper

Senior career*
Years	Team	Apps	(Gls)
- Bradford Park Avenue
1946–1949	Leeds United	28	(0)
1949	Halifax Town	3	(0)
1949–1953	Newport County	103	(0)
- Selby Town
1955–1956	Rochdale	1	(0)
- Winsford United
- * Club domestic league appearances and goals

Harrison "Harry" Fearnley (27 May 1923 – 6 January 2012) was an English professional footballer. He was born in Dewsbury. A goalkeeper, he began his career with Leeds United in 1946 before joining Halifax Town in 1948. In 1949 he joined Newport County and went on to make 103 appearances for the club. In 1953 he joined Selby Town, then appeared once for Rochdale in 1956 before moving to Winsford United.
