= Fred Taylor (footballer, born 1884) =

English footballer

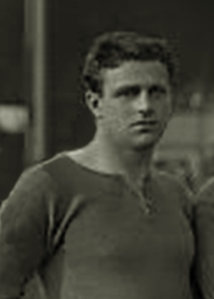
- Taylor while with Chelsea in 1913.

Personal information
- Full name: Frederick Taylor
- Date of birth: 3 January 1884
- Place of birth: Rotherham, England
- Date of death: 8 March 1948
- Place of death: Peterborough, England
- Height: 5 ft 8 in (1.73 m)
- Position: Half back

Senior career*
Years	Team	Apps	(Gls)
- Rotherham Town
1905	Gainsborough Trinity	21	(10)
- Kimberworth Old Boys
1907–1909	Gainsborough Trinity	84	(1)
1909–1917	Chelsea	155	(4)
1919–1920	Brentford	22	(1)
- Maidstone United
1921	Rochdale	19	(0)
- Fletton United

International career
	Football League XI	1	(0)

Managerial career
- 1936–1937: Peterborough United
- * Club domestic league appearances and goals

Fred Taylor (3 January 1884 – 1948) was an English footballer who played in the Football League for Chelsea, Gainsborough Trinity and Rochdale. He was a reliable right half-back who worked hard and liked to move up the field during attacks. He made one appearance for the Football League XI.

== Club career ==
Taylor started his league career playing for Second Division side Gainsborough Trinity but in 1909 he transferred to Chelsea. He was a member of the Chelsea side that reached the 1915 FA Cup Final. In addition to his 155 league appearances he played in 16 FA Cup games for Chelsea. He transferred to Brentford in June 1919 and was awarded a testimonial by Chelsea in 1920.

== Managerial career ==
Taylor was manager of Peterborough United for the 1936–37 Midland League season. He also served the club as trainer and groundsman.

== Honours ==
Chelsea

- FA Cup runner-up: 1914–15
