= Ernie Whiteside =

English footballer (1889–1953)

Personal information
- Full name: Ernest Whiteside
- Date of birth: 1 February 1889
- Place of birth: Lytham St Annes, England
- Date of death: 1953 (aged 63–64)
- Position: Wing-half

Senior career*
Years	Team	Apps	(Gls)
1904	Lytham St John's		
1905	Lytham Institute		
1906	Kirkham		
1908-1914	Bolton Wanderers	84	(0)
1914	York City		
1919	Shelbourne		
1919	Fleetwood		
1920	Halifax Town		
1921	Rochdale	3	(0)
Total		87	(0)
- * Club domestic league appearances and goals

Ernest Whiteside (1 February 1889 – 1953) was an English footballer who played as a wing-half for Bolton Wanderers and Rochdale.
