= Thomas Bennett (footballer) =

English footballer

Personal information
- Full name: Thomas Samuel Bennett
- Date of birth: April 1891
- Place of birth: Walton, Liverpool, England
- Date of death: 11 January 1923 (aged 31)
- Position: Centre-forward

Senior career*
Years	Team	Apps	(Gls)
1906	Charlestown	?	(?)
1907	Montreal Royal Rovers	?	(?)
1913	Everton	?	(?)
1913	South Liverpool	?	(?)
1914	Bury	?	(?)
1914	South Liverpool	?	(?)
1914	Northwich Victoria	?	(?)
1914–1915	South Liverpool	?	(?)
1916–1919	Liverpool	1	(0)
1920	Wigan Borough	?	(?)
1921	Halifax Town	?	(?)
1921–1922	Rochdale	3	(0)
Total		4	(0)
- * Club domestic league appearances and goals

Thomas Samuel Bennett (April 1891 – 11 January 1923) was an English footballer who played as a striker. He played league football for Liverpool and Rochdale.

Bennett was a prolific goal scorer for Liverpool and South Liverpool during World War One, but he only made four league appearances and one F.A. Cup appearance (with one goal) throughout his career.

Bennett died on 11 January 1923 from tuberculosis, aged 31.

== Career statistics ==
Club	Season	League			FA Cup		Total	
Club	Season	Division	Apps	Goals	Apps	Goals	Apps	Goals
Liverpool	1919–20	First Division	1	0	0	0	1	0
Rochdale	1921–22	Third Division North	3	0	1	1	4	1
Career total			4	0	1	1	5	1
