= South Liverpool F.C. (1890s) =

Coordinates: 53°22′04.12″N 2°56′19.71″W

- Full name: South Liverpool Football Club
- Founded: c.1897 (as African Royal)
- Dissolved: 1921 (became New Brighton A.F.C.)
- Capacity: ?

South Liverpool F.C. was a football club from Liverpool, England. The club's colours were white shirts, black shorts and red socks. The club relocated and became New Brighton A.F.C. in 1921. In 1935 a phoenix club was established South Liverpool F.C. (1935).

== History ==
=== Formation and playing years ===
It has long been accepted that the first South Liverpool F.C. was founded in the late-1890s when a club called African Royal (or, in some sources, Africa Royal) changed its name, under the influence of W.J. Sawyer, and relocated to Dingle, just south of the city centre.

The team played in The Combination and the Lancashire League before joining the Second Division of the Lancashire Combination in 1911. The club was promoted to the First Division in 1913, but the competition was suspended during the First World War.

By 1914, William James Sawyer was Secretary and managing director of a new company called South Liverpool Football & Athletic Club, with the team playing at Dingle Park in the Lancashire Combination Division 1 against the likes of Chester, Tranmere Rovers, Barrow, and Accrington Stanley. Sawyer became Hon. Secretary of Everton in 1918 and remained on the club's board of directors for a decade. Latterly he was Secretary-Manager of New Brighton in the 1930s, while he also offered consultancy to Wigan Borough FC on its formation in 1920.

=== Relocation ===
After the first world war, South Liverpool played for two more seasons; having lost access to the Dingle in 1920, it played at the Green Lane Tramway ground, but it was not success, so the club moved to Wallasey in 1921 and changed its name to New Brighton. There was a debate within the Lancashire Association as to whether New Brighton was a continuation or a new club, given that South Liverpool's directors had basically issued a large number of new shares for the New Brighton backers to buy, and, as a matter of expediency, New Brighton was allowed South Liverpool's official Lancashire FA registration. It also took on most of South Liverpool's staff, all of South Liverpool's debts (£200, reportedly), and South Liverpool's place in the Lancashire Combination for 1921–22. Therefore, New Brighton FC was a legal continuation of South Liverpool FC. The club was one and the same, although many sources claim, erroneously, that South Liverpool FC folded up in 1921 and that New Brighton FC was formed in 1921. (The connection between South Liverpool and New Brighton is similar to that of Wimbledon and Milton Keynes Dons).

In 1923, New Brighton secured election to the Football League Division Three (North). The club lost its League status in 1951 and folded in 1983.

=== Phoenix club ===
A phoenix club was set up in 1935 bearing the same name.
