= Hugh Cameron (Rochdale footballer) =

English footballer

Personal information
- Full name: Hugh Cameron
- Place of birth: Scotland
- Position: Inside forward

Senior career*
Years	Team	Apps	(Gls)
1914	Dunblane Rovers		
1919-1920	Burnley		
1920	King's Park		
1921	Burnley		
1921-1922	Rochdale	11	(2)
Total		11	(2)
- * Club domestic league appearances and goals

Hugh Cameron was a Scottish footballer who played league football for Rochdale and non league football for various other clubs.
