= George Schofield =

English footballer

George Willie Schofield (6 August 1893 – 1961) was an English footballer. His regular position was as a forward. He was born in Pontefract, West Yorkshire. He played for Manchester United, Southport Junior Football, and Crewe Alexandra.
