= Joe Sheehan (footballer) =

English footballer

Personal information
- Full name: William Joseph Sheehan
- Date of birth: 4 July 1892
- Place of birth: Rochdale, England
- Date of death: 1978 (aged 85–86)
- Height: 5 ft 8 in (1.73 m)
- Position: Full-back

Senior career*
Years	Team	Apps	(Gls)
1920	Rochdale St John's		
1921	Rochdale	1	(0)
1922	Rochdale Civil Service		
Total		1	(0)
- * Club domestic league appearances and goals

William Joseph Sheehan (4 July 1892 – 1978) was an English footballer who made one professional appearance for Rochdale when they joined the Football League in 1921. He also played for Rochdale St Johns and Rochdale Civil Service.
