= Tommy Green (footballer, born 1893) =

English footballer

Personal information
- Full name: Thomas Green
- Date of birth: 25 November 1893
- Place of birth: East Ham, England
- Date of death: 1975 (aged 81–82)
- Position: Centre forward

Senior career*
Years	Team	Apps	(Gls)
1919	West Ham United	3	(0)
1919–1920	Southport Central		
1920–1921	South Liverpool		
1921–1922	Accrington Stanley	30	(23)
1922–1923	Stockport County	31	(16)
1923–1924	Clapton Orient	24	(10)
1924–1925	Heart of Midlothian		
1925–1927	Third Lanark		
1927–1928	Flint Town		
1928	Wavertree Albion		
1929	Milners Safe Works		
Total		88	(49)
- * Club domestic league appearances and goals

Thomas Green (25 November 1893 – 1975) was an English footballer who played in the Football League for Accrington Stanley, Clapton Orient, Stockport County and West Ham United.
