= Harold Wadsworth =

English footballer

Personal information
- Full name: Harold Wadsworth
- Date of birth: 4 October 1898
- Place of birth: Bootle, Liverpool, England
- Date of death: 2 November 1975 (aged 77)
- Height: 5 ft 5 in (1.65 m)
- Position: Left winger

Senior career*
Years	Team	Apps	(Gls)
1914-1918	Tranmere Rovers		
1919-1924	Liverpool	55	(3)
1924-1927	Leicester City	98	(7)
1927–1928	Nottingham Forest	30	(9)
1928–1932	Millwall	70	(5)
- * Club domestic league appearances and goals

Harold Wadsworth (4 October 1898 – 2 November 1975) was an English footballer who made over 250 appearances in The Football League for Liverpool, Leicester City, Nottingham Forest and Millwall.

== Playing career ==
Wadsworth started his career at local club Bootle St Matthews before he was signed by Tranmere Rovers.

=== Liverpool ===
He signed for Liverpool in 1919 and made 9 appearances in his debut season. He made 25 appearances the following season, but his playing time was considerably reduced during the next two seasons as Liverpool won back-to-back championships.

=== Leicester City ===
He moved to Leicester City in June 1924 and made 106 appearances for the club and helped Leicester win the Division Two title in 1924–25. He left in April 1927 for Nottingham Forest.

=== Nottingham Forest ===
Wadsworth spent a year in Division Two for Nottingham Forest in the 1927–28 season on the left wing. He scored on his debut in the opening game of the season on 28 August 1927 in the 2–2 draw away at Port Vale and his last game was on 14 April 1928 at home to West Bromwich Albion.

He later played for Millwall.

== Career statistics ==
Club	Season	League			FA Cup		Total	
Club	Season	Division	Apps	Goals	Apps	Goals	Apps	Goals
Liverpool	1919-20	First Division	9	0	0	0	9	0
Liverpool	1920-21	First Division	25	3	0	0	25	3
Liverpool	1921-22	First Division	1	0	0	0	1	0
Liverpool	1922-23	First Division	3	0	0	0	3	0
Liverpool	1923-24	First Division	17	0	0	0	17	0
Liverpool	Total		55	3	0	0	55	3
Leicester City	1924-25	Second Division	42	1	6	0	48	1
Leicester City	1925-26	First Division	38	2	1	0	39	2
Leicester City	1926-27	First Division	18	4	1	0	19	4
Leicester City	Total		98	7	8	0	106	7
Nottingham Forest	1927-28	Second Division	30	9	5	1	35	10
Nottingham Forest	Total		30	9	5	1	35	10
Millwall	1928-29	Second Division	23	4	4	0	27	4
Millwall	1929-30	Second Division	8	0	3	0	11	0
Millwall	1930-31	Second Division	39	1	1	0	40	1
Millwall	Total		70	5	8	0	78	5
Career total			253	24	21	1	274	25
