= Harry Foster (footballer) =

English footballer (1898–1980)

Personal information
- Date of birth: 20 March 1898
- Place of birth: Rochdale, England
- Date of death: 1980 (aged 81–82)
- Position: Winger

Senior career*
Years	Team	Apps	(Gls)
1920	Sudden Villa		
1922	Rochdale	2	(0)
Total		2	(0)
- * Club domestic league appearances and goals

Harry Foster (20 March 1898 – 1980) was an English footballer who played as a winger for Rochdale
