= Arthur Gee =

English footballer

Personal information
- Full name: Arthur Gee
- Date of birth: June 1892
- Place of birth: Earlestown, Newton-le-Willows, England
- Date of death: 1959 (aged 66–67)
- Position: Centre forward

Senior career*
| Years | Team | Apps | (Gls) |
- Earlestown
| | Oldham Athletic | 112 | (43) |
- Stalybridge Celtic
| 1922 | Rochdale | 8 | (2) |
- Ashton National
- Nuneaton Town
| 1926–1927 | Mossley | | |
| 1927–19?? | Witton Albion | | |
- * Club domestic league appearances and goals

Arthur Gee (June 1892 in Earlestown, Newton-le-Willows, Lancashire – 1959) was an English professional footballer. He played in the Football League for Oldham Athletic and Rochdale.

Gee played for his local side Earlestown before joining Oldham Athletic. In the 1913-14 season, Gee was joint top scorer (with Oliver Tummon, scoring ten times as Oldham finished 4th in Division One. The following season they finished runners-up to Everton. Gee remained with the Latics during World War I and was again top scorer, with 13 goals in the 1919-20 season.

He left Oldham to join Stalybridge Celtic, but returned to the Football League with Rochdale. He then played for Ashton National and Nuneaton Town before joining Mossley where he was captain during 1926-27 season. On leaving Mossley he joined Witton Albion.
