= William Sneyd (footballer) =

English footballer

Personal information
- Full name: William Sneyd
- Date of birth: 12 August 1895
- Place of birth: Oldham, England
- Date of death: 1985 (aged 89–90)
- Position: Goalkeeper

Senior career*
Years	Team	Apps	(Gls)
1920	Ashton		
1921-1922	Rochdale	4	(0)
Total		4	(0)
- * Club domestic league appearances and goals

William Sneyd (12 August 1895 – 1985) was an English footballer who played for Rochdale when they joined the English Football League in 1921.
