= Sam Speakman =

English footballer (1884–1934)

Sam Speakman (9 August 1884 – 27 April 1934) was an English footballer who played as a defender for Liverpool in The Football League. Speakman started his career at Colne FC before he joined Liverpool. He played primarily as a full back and made 14 appearances for the club before the outbreak of World War I. He made 7 appearances during the war in a season that was completed, before football stopped. Following the resumption of football for the 1919–20 season he was unable to stake a regular place in the team and only made 4 appearances.
