= Harry Lewis (footballer, born 1896) =

English footballer

Harry Lewis (born 19 December 1896) was an English footballer who played as a striker for Liverpool in The Football League. Lewis signed for Liverpool following the end of the First World War and made 23 appearances during his debut season. He made a further 42 appearances over the next two seasons, but he was eventually transferred in 1923.
