= William Jenkinson (footballer, born 1892) =

English footballer

Bill Jenkinson
Personal information
- Full name: William Jenkinson
- Date of birth: 2 March 1892
- Place of birth: Golborne, England
- Date of death: 3 April 1967 (aged 75)
- Place of death: Liverpool, England
- Height: 5 ft 9 in (1.75 m)
- Position: Full-back

Youth career
- Golborne United

Senior career*
Years	Team	Apps	(Gls)
1916–1921	Liverpool	13	(0)
1921–1923	Wigan Borough	11	(0)
- Wallasey United
- * Club domestic league appearances and goals

William Jenkinson (2 March 1892 – 3 April 1967) was an English footballer who played as a defender for Liverpool and Wigan Borough.
