= Jack Bamber =

English footballer (1895–1973)

Personal information
- Full name: John Bamber
- Date of birth: 11 April 1895
- Place of birth: St Helens, England
- Date of death: 26 May 1973 (aged 78)
- Place of death: St Helens, England
- Height: 5 ft 9 1/2 in (1.77 m)
- Position: Half back

Youth career
- 1911–1913: St Helens Recreation
- 1913–1915: Heywood

Senior career*
Years	Team	Apps	(Gls)
1915–1924	Liverpool	72	(2)
1924–1927	Leicester City	113	(7)
1927–1930	Tranmere Rovers	86	(1)
1930–1932	Prescot Cables		
Total		271	(10)

International career
1921	England	1	(0)
- * Club domestic league appearances and goals

John Bamber (11 April 1895 – 26 May 1973) was an English footballer who played as a half back for Liverpool, Leicester City, Tranmere Rovers and Prescot Cables, as well as for the England national side.
