= 1926–27 Rochdale A.F.C. season =

English football club season

Rochdale
1926–27 season
- Chairman: George L. Foulds
- Manager: Jack Peart
- Stadium: Spotland Stadium
- Football League Third Division North: 2nd
- FA Cup: 1st Round
- Top goalscorer: League: Albert Whitehurst (44); All: Albert Whitehurst (46)
Home colours

The 1926–27 season was Rochdale A.F.C.'s 20th in existence and their 6th in the Football League Third Division North.

== Squad Statistics ==
=== Appearances and goals ===
| No. | Pos | Nat | Player | Total | | Division 3 North | | FA Cup | |
| No. | Pos | Nat | Player | Apps | Goals | Apps | Goals | Apps | Goals |
|---|---|---|---|---|---|---|---|---|---|
| | GK | (England) ENG | Len Hill | 35 | 0 | 34 | 0 | 1 | 0 |
| | DF | (England) ENG | Fred Mason | 3 | 0 | 3 | 0 | 0 | 0 |
| | DF | (Scotland) SCO | Willie Brown | 42 | 0 | 41 | 0 | 1 | 0 |
| | DF | (England) ENG | Ernie Braidwood | 40 | 1 | 40 | 1 | 0 | 0 |
| | DF | (England) ENG | David Parkes | 29 | 3 | 28 | 3 | 1 | 0 |
| | DF | (Scotland) SCO | Alex Christie | 34 | 0 | 33 | 0 | 1 | 0 |
| | FW | (England) ENG | Billy Tompkinson | 34 | 9 | 34 | 9 | 0 | 0 |
| | FW | (England) ENG | Billy Bertram | 36 | 14 | 35 | 13 | 1 | 1 |
| | FW | (England) ENG | Reuben Butler | 5 | 0 | 5 | 0 | 0 | 0 |
| | FW | (England) ENG | Albert Whitehurst | 43 | 46 | 42 | 44 | 1 | 2 |
| | MF | (England) ENG | Henry Martin | 22 | 10 | 21 | 10 | 1 | 0 |
| | DF | (Wales) WAL | Dai Hopkins | 2 | 0 | 2 | 0 | 0 | 0 |
| | FW | (Scotland) SCO | Alec Ross | 1 | 1 | 1 | 1 | 0 | 0 |
| | MF | (Scotland) SCO | John Hillhouse | 22 | 0 | 21 | 0 | 1 | 0 |
| | FW | (England) ENG | Bill Hooper | 21 | 1 | 20 | 1 | 1 | 0 |
| | FW | (England) ENG | Griffith Owen | 3 | 0 | 3 | 0 | 0 | 0 |
| | MF | (England) ENG | Cecil Halkyard | 6 | 0 | 6 | 0 | 0 | 0 |
| | DF | (England) ENG | Yaffer Ward | 36 | 0 | 35 | 0 | 1 | 0 |
| | FW | (England) ENG | Bobby Hughes | 33 | 16 | 32 | 16 | 1 | 0 |
| | MF | (England) ENG | Joe Campbell | 1 | 0 | 1 | 0 | 0 | 0 |
| | FW | (England) ENG | Bob Schofield | 14 | 6 | 14 | 6 | 0 | 0 |
| | DF | (England) ENG | Alfred Kellett | 1 | 0 | 1 | 0 | 0 | 0 |
| | GK | (England) ENG | Harry Moody | 8 | 0 | 8 | 0 | 0 | 0 |
| | MF | (England) ENG | Jack Hall | 2 | 1 | 2 | 1 | 0 | 0 |
| | | | A. Lancaster | 0 | 0 | 0 | 0 | 0 | 0 |
| | DF | (England) ENG | Dick Duckworth | 0 | 0 | 0 | 0 | 0 | 0 |

Squad Statistics (Non-competitive)

=== Appearances and goals (non-competitive) ===
| No. | Pos | Nat | Player | Total | | Lancashire Cup | | Manchester Cup | |
| No. | Pos | Nat | Player | Apps | Goals | Apps | Goals | Apps | Goals |
|---|---|---|---|---|---|---|---|---|---|
| | GK | (England) ENG | Len Hill | 1 | 0 | 1 | 0 | 0 | 0 |
| | DF | (England) ENG | Fred Mason | 2 | 0 | 0 | 0 | 2 | 0 |
| | DF | (Scotland) SCO | Willie Brown | 1 | 0 | 1 | 0 | 0 | 0 |
| | DF | (England) ENG | Ernie Braidwood | 1 | 0 | 1 | 0 | 0 | 0 |
| | DF | (England) ENG | David Parkes | 1 | 0 | 1 | 0 | 0 | 0 |
| | DF | (Scotland) SCO | Alex Christie | 0 | 0 | 0 | 0 | 0 | 0 |
| | FW | (England) ENG | Billy Tompkinson | 0 | 0 | 0 | 0 | 0 | 0 |
| | FW | (England) ENG | Billy Bertram | 0 | 0 | 0 | 0 | 0 | 0 |
| | FW | (England) ENG | Reuben Butler | 2 | 2 | 1 | 0 | 1 | 2 |
| | FW | (England) ENG | Albert Whitehurst | 2 | 1 | 1 | 0 | 1 | 1 |
| | MF | (England) ENG | Henry Martin | 0 | 0 | 0 | 0 | 0 | 0 |
| | DF | (Wales) WAL | Dai Hopkins | 2 | 0 | 0 | 0 | 2 | 0 |
| | FW | (Scotland) SCO | Alec Ross | 0 | 0 | 0 | 0 | 0 | 0 |
| | MF | (Scotland) SCO | John Hillhouse | 0 | 0 | 0 | 0 | 0 | 0 |
| | FW | (England) ENG | Bill Hooper | 2 | 0 | 0 | 0 | 2 | 0 |
| | FW | (England) ENG | Griffith Owen | 1 | 0 | 1 | 0 | 0 | 0 |
| | MF | (England) ENG | Cecil Halkyard | 3 | 0 | 1 | 0 | 2 | 0 |
| | DF | (England) ENG | Yaffer Ward | 1 | 0 | 1 | 0 | 0 | 0 |
| | FW | (England) ENG | Bobby Hughes | 1 | 0 | 1 | 0 | 0 | 0 |
| | MF | (England) ENG | Joe Campbell | 3 | 0 | 1 | 0 | 2 | 0 |
| | FW | (England) ENG | Bob Schofield | 1 | 0 | 0 | 0 | 1 | 0 |
| | DF | (England) ENG | Alfred Kellett | 2 | 0 | 0 | 0 | 2 | 0 |
| | GK | (England) ENG | Harry Moody | 2 | 0 | 0 | 0 | 2 | 0 |
| | MF | (England) ENG | Jack Hall | 1 | 2 | 0 | 0 | 1 | 2 |
| | | | A. Lancaster | 2 | 0 | 0 | 0 | 2 | 0 |
| | DF | (England) ENG | Dick Duckworth | 2 | 1 | 0 | 0 | 2 | 1 |

== Final league table ==
| Pos | Team | Pld | W | D | L | GF | GA | GAv | Pts | Promotion |
|---|---|---|---|---|---|---|---|---|---|---|
| 1 | Stoke City (C, P) | 42 | 27 | 9 | 6 | 92 | 40 | 2.300 | 63 | Promotion to the Second Division |
| 2 | Rochdale | 42 | 26 | 6 | 10 | 105 | 65 | 1.615 | 58 | |
| 3 | Bradford (Park Avenue) | 42 | 24 | 7 | 11 | 101 | 59 | 1.712 | 55 | |
| 4 | Halifax Town | 42 | 21 | 11 | 10 | 70 | 53 | 1.321 | 53 | |
| 5 | Nelson | 42 | 22 | 7 | 13 | 104 | 75 | 1.387 | 51 | |

Source: rsssf.com
(C) Champions; (P) Promoted

== Competitions ==
=== Football League Third Division North ===
| 28 August 1926 1 | Accrington Stanley | 0–1 | Rochdale | Accrington |
| | | Report | Martin | Stadium: Peel Park; Attendance: 7335 |

| 31 August 1926 2 | Rochdale | 3–1 | Crewe Alexandra | Rochdale |
| | Bertram; Parkes; Martin | Report | Brown | Stadium: Spotland Stadium; Attendance: 7440 |

| 4 September 1926 3 | Rochdale | 1–3 | Durham City | Rochdale |
| | Ross | Report | Sergeaunt; Butler; Elliott | Stadium: Spotland Stadium; Attendance: 7947 |

| 6 September 1926 4 | Crewe Alexandra | 4–0 | Rochdale | Crewe |
| | Cotton; Thompson; Kay | Report | | Stadium: Gresty Road; Attendance: 5282 |

| 11 September 1926 5 | Tranmere Rovers | 0–1 | Rochdale | Birkenhead |
| | | Report | Whitehurst | Stadium: Prenton Park; Attendance: 9810 |

| 13 September 1926 6 | Barrow | 2–3 | Rochdale | Barrow-in-Furness |
| | Christie; Tilbrook | Report | Parkes; Martin; Whitehurst | Stadium: Holker Street; Attendance: 4001 |

| 18 September 1926 7 | Rochdale | 3–1 | Wrexham | Rochdale |
| | Hughes; Hooper; Whitehurst | Report | Hodgkinson | Stadium: Spotland Stadium; Attendance: 7564 |

| 25 September 1926 8 | Rochdale | 1–0 | Southport | Rochdale |
| | Tompkinson | Report | | Stadium: Spotland Stadium; Attendance: 4308 |

| 2 October 1926 9 | Stockport County | 3–0 | Rochdale | Stockport |
| | Scurr; Johnston; Burgess | Report | | Stadium: Edgeley Park; Attendance: 10161 |

| 9 October 1926 10 | Rochdale | 3–0 | Hartlepools United | Rochdale |
| | Martin; Tompkinson; Whitehurst | Report | | Stadium: Spotland Stadium; Attendance: 2596 |

| 16 October 1926 11 | Ashington | 2–2 | Rochdale | Ashington |
| | Turnbull; Ferguson | Report | Whitehurst | Stadium: Portland Park; Attendance: 2282 |

| 23 October 1926 12 | Rochdale | 1–1 | New Brighton | Rochdale |
| | Whitehurst | Report | Wade | Stadium: Spotland Stadium; Attendance: 6751 |

| 30 October 1926 13 | Wigan Borough | 0–3 | Rochdale | Wigan |
| | | Report | Hughes; Bertram; Whitehurst | Stadium: Springfield Park; Attendance: 3486 |

| 6 November 1926 14 | Rochdale | 7–2 | Doncaster Rovers | Rochdale |
| | Whitehurst; Hughes; Martin | Report | H. Keetley; T. Keetley | Stadium: Spotland Stadium; Attendance: 3654 |

| 13 November 1926 15 | Stoke City | 3–1 | Rochdale | Stoke-on-Trent |
| | Davies; Johnson; Williamson | Report | Bertram | Stadium: Victoria Ground; Attendance: 11213 |

| 20 November 1926 16 | Rochdale | 2–1 | Rotherham United | Rochdale |
| | Whitehurst; Braidwood | Report | Higginbotham | Stadium: Spotland Stadium; Attendance: 4795 |

| 4 December 1926 17 | Rochdale | 4–4 | Walsall | Rochdale |
| | Whitehurst; Tompkinson; Martin | Report | White; Walters | Stadium: Spotland Stadium; Attendance: 5009 |

| 11 December 1926 18 | Rotherham United | 1–1 | Rochdale | Rotherham |
| | Scott | Report | Whitehurst | Stadium: Millmoor; Attendance: 3296 |

| 18 December 1926 19 | Rochdale | 8–1 | Chesterfield | Rochdale |
| | Schofield; Whitehurst; Martin | Report | Cookson | Stadium: Spotland Stadium; Attendance: 5768 |

| 25 December 1926 20 | Rochdale | 7–3 | Lincoln City | Rochdale |
| | Schofield; Whitehurst; Hughes | Report | Sayer 77', 79'; Dinsdale 88' | Stadium: Spotland Stadium; Attendance: 8921 |

| 27 December 1926 21 | Lincoln City | 2–3 | Rochdale | Lincoln |
| | Pegg 10'; Marshall 22' | Report | Schofield 17'; Whitehurst 37', 74' | Stadium: Sincil Bank; Attendance: 7812 |

| 1 January 1927 22 | Halifax Town | 1–0 | Rochdale | Halifax |
| | Coleman | Report | | Stadium: The Shay; Attendance: 10846; Referee: ER Westwood |

| 8 January 1927 23 | Bradford Park Avenue | 5–1 | Rochdale | Bradford |
| | McDonald; Taylor; McLean | Report | Tompkinson | Stadium: Park Avenue; Attendance: 7423 |

| 15 January 1927 24 | Rochdale | 2–1 | Accrington Stanley | Rochdale |
| | Bertram; Parkes (pen.) | Report | Gee | Stadium: Spotland Stadium; Attendance: 2992 |

| 22 January 1927 25 | Durham City | 1–3 | Rochdale | Durham |
| | Stephenson | Report | Whitehurst | Stadium: Holiday Park; Attendance: 1886 |

| 29 January 1927 26 | Rochdale | 3–1 | Tranmere Rovers | Rochdale |
| | Hughes; Tompkinson | Report | Flanagan | Stadium: Spotland Stadium; Attendance: 5020 |

| 5 February 1927 27 | Wrexham | 2–2 | Rochdale | Wrexham |
| | Smith; Lovatt | Report | Schofield; Whitehurst | Stadium: Racecourse Ground; Attendance: 3717 |

| 12 February 1927 28 | Southport | 1–1 | Rochdale | Southport |
| | Sapsford | Report | Whitehurst | Stadium: Haig Avenue; Attendance: 3409 |

| 19 February 1927 29 | Rochdale | 2–0 | Stockport County | Rochdale |
| | Bertram; Tompkinson | Report | | Stadium: Spotland Stadium; Attendance: 10239 |

| 26 February 1927 30 | Hartlepools United | 3–2 | Rochdale | Hartlepool |
| | Waite; Jobson (pen.); Craig | Report | Hughes; Whitehurst | Stadium: Victoria Park; Attendance: 4000 |

| 5 March 1927 31 | Rochdale | 5–0 | Ashington | Rochdale |
| | Hughes; Whitehurst | Report | | Stadium: Spotland Stadium; Attendance: 2482 |

| 12 March 1927 32 | New Brighton | 1–2 | Rochdale | New Brighton |
| | Worrall | Report | Bertram; Whitehurst | Stadium: Sandheys Park; Attendance: 4442 |

| 19 March 1927 33 | Rochdale | 4–1 | Wigan Borough | Rochdale |
| | Whitehurst; Bertram; Tompkinson | Report | McGuire | Stadium: Spotland Stadium; Attendance: 6434 |

| 26 March 1927 34 | Doncaster Rovers | 3–2 | Rochdale | Doncaster |
| | Keetley | Report | Whitehurst; Bertram | Stadium: Belle Vue; Attendance: 5779 |

| 2 April 1927 35 | Rochdale | 4–0 | Stoke City | Rochdale |
| | Bertram; Whitehurst; Hughes | Report | | Stadium: Spotland Stadium; Attendance: 12727 |

| 5 April 1927 36 | Nelson | 3–1 | Rochdale | Nelson |
| | Hampson; White | Report | Tompkinson | Stadium: Seedhill; Attendance: 5871 |

| 16 April 1927 37 | Rochdale | 3–0 | Bradford Park Avenue | Rochdale |
| | Whitehurst; Hughes | Report | | Stadium: Spotland Stadium; Attendance: 8871 |

| 18 April 1927 38 | Rochdale | 2–0 | Halifax Town | Rochdale |
| | Tompkinson; Bertram | Report | | Stadium: Spotland Stadium; Attendance: 8501 |

| 19 April 1927 39 | Rochdale | 5–1 | Barrow | Rochdale |
| | Hughes; Bertram; Whitehurst | Report | Mortimer | Stadium: Spotland Stadium; Attendance: 3910 |

| 23 April 1927 40 | Walsall | 4–1 | Rochdale | Walsall |
| | Edwards; Raynes; Alcock; Robson | Report | Hughes | Stadium: Fellows Park; Attendance: 2421 |

| 30 April 1927 41 | Rochdale | 2–1 | Nelson | Rochdale |
| | Whitehurst; Bertram | Report | Wilson | Stadium: Spotland Stadium; Attendance: 3871 |

| 7 May 1927 42 | Chesterfield | 2–3 | Rochdale | Chesterfield |
| | Hopkinson; Cookson | Report | Whitehurst; Hall | Stadium: Saltergate; Attendance: 4307 |

=== FA Cup ===
| 27 November 1926 1 | Accrington Stanley | 4–3 | Rochdale | Accrington |
| | Martin; Gee; Clarkson | Report | Whitehurst; Bertram | Stadium: Peel Park; Attendance: 7000 |

=== Lancashire Cup ===
| 28 September 1926 2 | Burnley | 1–0 | Rochdale | Burnley |
| | Goal | | Parkes (red card) | Stadium: Turf Moor |

=== Manchester Cup ===
| 15 February 1927 2 | Rochdale | 5–0 | Mossley | Rochdale |
| | Butler; Hall; Duckworth | | | Stadium: Spotland Stadium |

| 1 March 1927 3 | Manchester North End | 2–1 | Rochdale | Manchester |
| | Goal | | Whitehurst |
