= Penman =

Penman is a surname. Surnames of Scotland by George F. Black states that it is "of local origin from a small place of the name formally in Roxburghshire or Selkirkshire."

Bearers of the name include:

- Andy Penman (1943–1994), Scottish footballer
- David Penman (1936–1989), Australian Anglican archbishop of Melbourne
- Ian Penman (born 1959), British writer and blogger
- Ian Penman (producer), British radio and television writer
- Jim Penman (born 1952), Australian businessman
- Nelia Penman (1915–2017), British politician
- Percival Penman (1885–1944), Australian cricketer
- Robert Penman (fl. 1920s/30s), Scottish footballer
- Sharon Kay Penman (1945–2021), American historical novelist

== See also ==
- Emanuel Ninger (1846/1847–1924), American counterfeiter nicknamed "Jim the Penman"
- James Townshend Saward (1798–c. 1875), English barrister and forger nicknamed "Jim the Penman"
- Southern New Hampshire Penmen, the athletic teams of Southern New Hampshire University
