= Yaffer Ward =

English footballer (1895–1953)

Personal information
- Full name: Fred Ward
- Date of birth: 30 January 1895
- Place of birth: Lincoln, England
- Date of death: 10 September 1953 (aged 58)
- Place of death: Lincoln, England
- Height: 5 ft 10 in (1.78 m)
- Position: Left back

Senior career*
Years	Team	Apps	(Gls)
- Stamp End
- South Bar
- West End (Lincoln)
1914–1922	Lincoln City (Note: Without a source for appearances in the 1920–21 Midland League, Lincoln City figures include only Football League appearances.)	99	(8)
1922–1925	Wigan Borough	70	(0)
1925–1926	Lincoln City	7	(2)
1926–1928	Rochdale	67	(0)
1928–1931	Lincoln City	2	(0)
Total		245	(10)
- * Club domestic league appearances and goals

Fred Ward (30 January 1895 – 10 September 1953), commonly known as Yaffa or Yaffer Ward, was an English professional footballer who made 245 appearances in the Football League playing for Lincoln City (in three separate spells), Wigan Borough and Rochdale. He played primarily at left back.

== Personal life ==
Ward was born in 1895 in Lincoln, Lincolnshire, a younger son of Samuel Ward, an engine fitter, and his wife Elizabeth. Ward attended Monks Road Council School, played for its football team, and played representative football as a left half for Lincoln Boys. In 1916, he and another man were awarded Certificates of the Royal Humane Society for their involvement in the rescue of two workmen who had fallen into the River Witham when the railings they were leaning against gave way.

By September 1931, Ward was the licensee of a pub, the Golden Eagle in Lincoln's High Street. The 1939 Register finds him still there, living with his wife, Lizzie nee Pinkstone, whom he married in 1918, and two children, a son of working age and a school-age daughter.

Ward died at his home in Lincoln in September 1953 at the age of 58.

== Football career ==
As a teenager, Ward played Lincoln League football for Stamp End, South Bar and West End, and had a trial with Sheffield Wednesday – during which he played for their reserve team against Lincoln City's reserves – before turning professional with his home-town club on 12 August 1914. He made his debut in the Football League Second Division on 27 February 1915, replacing Jack Dunne at left back for the visit to Clapton Orient, which Lincoln lost 3–1, and made five more appearances that season, at the end of which the Football League was suspended for the duration of the First World War. Ward played for Grimsby Town as well as for Lincoln in wartime competitions; he worked at Immingham during the war, and under the emergency rules, a player could represent the club nearest to their place of employment.

Ward was first choice as Lincoln City's left back when the Football League resumed after the war. He made 38 league appearances in 1919–20 as they finished 21st in the Second Division and failed to be re-elected. He helped Lincoln win the 1920–21 Midland League title and return to the Football League as founder members of its Third Division North, and made a further 55 league appearances before the club's financial difficulties meant he and wing half James McGrahan were sold to Wigan Borough in 1922.

Ward and McGrahan's fourth match was against their former club, and was Wigan Borough's record Football League victory: they won 9–1, after Lincoln's goalkeeper, Jack Kendall, was knocked unconscious by the ball rebounding from the frame of the goal. When available, Ward was a regular at left back in the 1923–24 season: he was injured during Wigan's FA Cup tie against Nelson on 1 December – according to the Athletic News report, "it was unfortunate that [he] should have been injured, for he played strongly, tackling vigorously but cleanly, and kicking a fine length" – and did not return until the end of January, and in early March, away to Lincoln City, Ward "fouled Roe so badly that the referee ordered him off without warning" and was suspended for a month. He made 30 appearances in 1924–25, and was transfer-listed at the end of the season.

He returned to Lincoln City in September 1925, and had a run of ten first-team games in the middle of the season, seven in the league and three in the FA Cup, but was mainly used in the reserves. He moved on to Rochdale. After one match in the reserves, he went into the first team, and remained in it, partnering Davie Parkes at full back, for the next two seasons, helping Rochdale finish as runners-up in the 1926–27 Third Division North.

He finished his career with three years back at Lincoln. Although he mainly played in the reserves, he did make two first-team appearances in the 1930–31 season, setting a record of 15 years 296 days between first and last appearances for the club which stood until 2007.

== Style of play ==
Ward was well known for sliding tackles, and was reported to be "a back known on every Northern Section ground for his ultra robust methods" whose "hefty kicking [was] not always tempered by discretion". Asked in a 1931 interview about how the game had changed during his career, Ward said that full-backs "used to have to get rid of the ball quickly" but now were encouraged to run and pass (he preferred the more basic approach), and that the game had become less physical: "If you just touch a man now it is a foul", while conceding that for those on the receiving end, that was an improvement. Ward was the regular penalty-taker for Lincoln City: of his ten goals for the club, seven were penalties.

== Career statistics ==
Appearances and goals by club, season and competition
Club	Season	League			FA Cup		Other		Total	
Club	Season	Division	Apps	Goals	Apps	Goals	Apps	Goals	Apps	Goals
Lincoln City	1914–15	Second Division	6	0	0	0	0	0	6	0
Lincoln City	1919–20	Second Division	38	2	1	0	0	0	39	2
Lincoln City	1920–21	Midland League								
Lincoln City	1921–22	Third Division North	30	3	1	0	0	0	31	3
Lincoln City	1922–23	Third Division North	25	3	1	0	0	0	26	3
Lincoln City	Total		108	10	9	0	0	0	117	10
Wigan Borough	1922–23	Third Division North	13	0	0	0	1 (Note: Appearance in Manchester Senior Cup)	0	14	0
Wigan Borough	1923–24	Third Division North	28	0	1	0	5 (Note: Two appearances in Lancashire Senior Cup, three in Manchester Senior Cup)	0	34	0
Wigan Borough	1924–25	Third Division North	29	0	1	0	1 (Note: Appearance in Lancashire Senior Cup)	0	31	0
Wigan Borough	Total		70	0	2	0	7	0	79	0
Lincoln City	1925–26	Third Division North	7	2	3	0	0	0	10	2
Rochdale	1926–27	Third Division North	35	0	1	0		0	36	0
Rochdale	1927–28	Third Division North	32	0	1	0		0	33	0
Rochdale	Total		67	0	2	0	2 (Note: One appearance in Lancashire Senior Cup, one in Manchester Senior Cup)	0	71	0
Lincoln City	1928–29	Third Division North	0	0	0	0	0	0	0	0
Lincoln City	1929–30	Third Division North	0	0	0	0	0	0	0	0
Lincoln City	1930–31	Third Division North	2	0	0	0	0	0	2	0
Lincoln City	Total		2	0	0	0	0	0	2	0
Career total			245	10	10	0	7	0	262	10

== Sources ==
- Joyce, Michael (2004). Football League Players' Records 1888 to 1939. Nottingham: SoccerData. ISBN 978-1-899468-67-6.
- Phillipps, Steven (2013). Rochdale AFC: A Who's Who, 1907 to 1939. Nottingham: Tony Brown. ISBN 978-1-905891-64-1.
