= Thomas Blair =

Thomas or Tom Blair may refer to:-

- Tom Blair (1892–1961) Scottish footballer (Kilmarnock, Manchester City)
- Tom Blair (footballer, born 1999) (born 1999), English footballer (Dorking Wanderers) see 2023–24 Rochdale A.F.C. season
