= Willie Hillhouse =

Scottish footballer

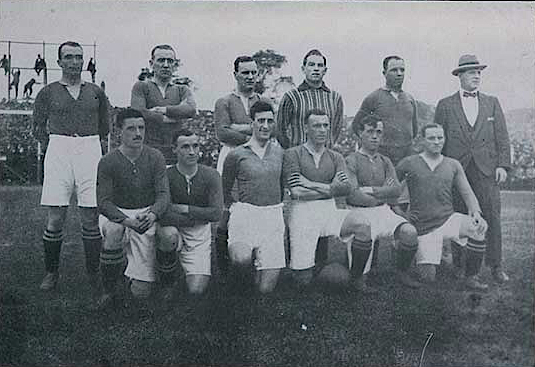
- Third Lanark team during 1923 tour – Hillhouse kneeling, far right

Personal information
- Full name: William Hillhouse
- Date of birth: 19 November 1891
- Place of birth: Hurlford, Scotland
- Date of death: 21 August 1968 (aged 76)
- Place of death: Kilmarnock, Scotland
- Position: Outside left

Senior career*
Years	Team	Apps	(Gls)
–	Renfrew Victoria		
1913–1919	Motherwell	22	(1)
1919–1921	Albion Rovers	62	(15)
1921–1925	Third Lanark	79	(13)
1923	→ Nithsdale Wanderers (loan)		
1925–1926	Galston	5	(1)
Total		168	(30)
- * Club domestic league appearances and goals

William Hillhouse (19 November 1891 – 21 August 1968) was a Scottish footballer who played mainly as an outside left. The major event of his career was appearing in the 1920 Scottish Cup Final with Albion Rovers, scoring the second of his side's goals in a 3–2 defeat to Kilmarnock (his hometown club). Hillhouse also played for Motherwell – he was contracted there for six seasons but only played for them in the first two, possibly due to commitments relating to World War I – and Third Lanark, touring South America with the latter in the summer of 1923 and appearing on the losing side in the Glasgow Cup final later that year.

His younger brother Hugh spent three seasons with Queen's Park; their cousin John, who grew up on the same street in Hurlford, was also a footballer.
