= Classic Pop =

UK magazine

- Editor: Steve Harnell
- Editor-at-large: Ian Peel
- Former editors: Ian Peel, Rik Flynn
- Categories: Music magazine
- Frequency: Monthly
- Publisher: Anthem Publishing
- Founder: Ian Peel
- First issue: October 2012
- Country: United Kingdom
- Language: English
- Website: classicpopmag.com
- ISSN: 2050-6643
- OCLC: 1368300561

Classic Pop is a British monthly music magazine published by Anthem Publishing. It launched in October 2012 with a primary focus on 1980s pop music, and carries regular features such as news, interviews and reviews. Content from the magazine has been reprinted by major news and entertainment outlets including BBC News, the New York Times and Rolling Stone.

Classic Pop was founded by music journalist Ian Peel, who was its original editor. Steve Harnell now serves as editor, although Peel remains involved as editor-at-large. The magazine has also featured regular contributions from veteran music critics such as John Earls, Paul Lester and Annie Zaleski.

The magazine has published special one-off editions, titled Classic Pop Presents, which are dedicated to a specific career or movement/time period in pop music.

== Background and content ==
Classic Pop was created by music journalist Ian Peel, who felt that 1980s pop music was not receiving the recognition it deserved. Anthem Publishing helped to develop the title, believing there was a gap in the market for a magazine that treated pop seriously. Peel served as editor for the first 20 issues before being succeeded by Rik Flynn, but remains involved with the magazine as editor-at-large. Steve Harnell now occupies the position of editor.

Aimed at "grownup" pop fans, Classic Pop launched in October 2012 with the tagline, "Eighties, Electronic, Eclectic". The magazine was initially published every two months, but has since alternated between bi-monthly and monthly frequencies; in June 2025, it again became a monthly publication. Regular features include news, artist interviews, career retrospectives, reviews, and analyses of classic albums. According to Jenny Valentish of the Sydney Morning Herald, Classic Pop is "based in the UK for a global audience hungry for the nitty-gritty details they weren't given first time around, or were too young to appreciate. Want to read about Alannah Currie from the Thompson Twins storming Parliament in New Zealand in her bra as an anti-GM activist? No problem." Author and DJ Food frontman, Kevin Foakes, felt that Classic Pop would appeal to "those who remember Smash Hits from back in the day and yearn to break free of the endless rehashing of the Beatles/Stones/Who/Dylan/Zeppelin pop/rock mafia in the other music monthlies." The magazine reported a circulation of 35,000 as of May 2015.

Classic Pop has also published special one-off editions, titled Classic Pop Presents, which are dedicated to a specific career or movement/time period in pop music. These issues include numerous articles and photographs related to the topic, with minimal advertising content. Subjects have included David Bowie, the Pet Shop Boys, and the New Romantic phase.

Classic Pop content has been reprinted by major news and entertainment outlets including BBC News, the New York Times, Rolling Stone, the Independent and the NME.

== Writers ==
Along with Peel, contributors to Classic Pop have included Mark Frith, Paul Lester, Ian Ravendale, Matthew Rudd and Annie Zaleski. Critic John Earls has won multiple publishing industry awards for his work on the magazine; he became reviews editor in 2025. Veteran writer Wyndham Wallace is a longstanding contributor and previously served as reviews editor. Journalist Ian Wade has also written for Classic Pop, covering queer culture and its links to pop music.
