= Bill Ribchester =

Scottish footballer

Personal information
- Full name: William Ribchester
- Date of birth: 28 July 1898
- Place of birth: Govan, Scotland
- Date of death: 23 February 1986 (aged 87)
- Place of death: Blackpool, England
- Position: Outside right

Youth career
- St Mungo's Academy
- Townhead Juveniles

Senior career*
Years	Team	Apps	(Gls)
–	Benburb		
–	Parkhead		
1916–1919	Celtic	2	(0)
1919–1923	Albion Rovers	56	(10)
1922–1923	→ St Johnstone (loan)	35	(7)
1923–1925	St Johnstone	39	(12)
1924–1925	Dunfermline Athletic	20	(4)
1925–1926	Armadale	7	(0)
Total		159	(33)
- * Club domestic league appearances and goals

William Ribchester (28 July 1898 – 23 February 1986) was a Scottish footballer who played as an outside right.

The son of a Lancastrian schoolmaster who relocated to Govan, Ribchester began his senior career with Celtic in 1916, making two Scottish Football League appearances as an 18-year-old filling in for the injured Andy McAtee. World War I was already underway, and having already been a member of the Officers' Training Corps he was soon called into active duty, serving as a second lieutenant with the Machine Gun Corps and being wounded at Amiens in August 1918. He was able to resume playing football when the conflict ended, though he could not break into the Celtic team and moved on to Albion Rovers, playing in the 1920 Scottish Cup Final, a 3–2 loss to Kilmarnock, at the end of his first of three seasons in Coatbridge.

He later played for St Johnstone (initially on loan), being an almost constant presence in the side that won the 1923–24 Scottish Division Two title, though he played little in the following campaign (the club's first at Muirton Park) and was loaned back to the lower tier with Dunfermline Athletic, before ending his career with Armadale. Ribchester was later also a school teacher like his father.
