= Robert Penman =

Scottish footballer

Personal information
- Date of birth: 1891
- Place of birth: Holytown, Scotland
- Position: Full back

Senior career*
Years	Team	Apps	(Gls)
–	Ashfield		
1914–1919	Motherwell	83	(0)
1919–1924	Albion Rovers	175	(0)
1924–1929	St Johnstone	126	(0)
Total		384	(0)
- * Club domestic league appearances and goals

Robert Penman (born 1891) was a Scottish footballer who played as a full back for Motherwell, Albion Rovers and St Johnstone.

== Playing career ==
He played in the 1920 Scottish Cup Final which Albion Rovers lost to Kilmarnock. He later emigrated to Canada where he worked as a football coach in Manitoba.
