= Tom Blair =

Scottish footballer

Personal information
- Full name: Thomas Blair
- Date of birth: 24 February 1892
- Place of birth: Hutchesontown, Scotland
- Date of death: 28 August 1961 (aged 69)
- Place of death: Monifieth, Scotland
- Height: 5 ft 11 1/2 in (1.82 m)
- Position: Goalkeeper

Senior career*
Years	Team	Apps	(Gls)
- Vale of Clyde
1912–1920	Kilmarnock	226	(0)
1920–1922	Manchester City	38	(0)
1925–1926	Boston	17	(0)
1926–1927	Fall River	34	(0)
1927	Hartford Americans	11	(0)
1928–1930	New Bedford Whalers	60	(0)
1931	Pawtucket Rangers	9	(0)
1931–1932	Ayr United		
1932–1933	Linfield		
1937	Dundee United	1	(0)

International career
1917	Scottish League (wartime)	1	(0)
- * Club domestic league appearances and goals

Thomas Blair (24 February 1892 – 28 August 1961) was a Scottish footballer who played as a goalkeeper.

== Career ==
Blair was prominent in the 1910s playing for Kilmarnock, with the culmination of his nine-year spell there being a Scottish Cup win in 1920, lifting the trophy as team captain. He then moved to England with Manchester City, spending two years there but only the regular in his position in the second campaign. He played on both sides in the Home Scots v Anglo-Scots international trial and conceded only once in each match, but this did not lead on to a full cap for Scotland.

By now in his 30s, Blair accepted an invitation to play in the American Soccer League, appearing for teams including Fall River and New Bedford Whalers. After several years in the United States he returned to Scotland with Ayr United (no league appearances recorded) then spent time in Northern Ireland at Linfield before becoming a coach at Dundee United in 1937. That same year he made a final, emergency SFL appearance in a 7–1 defeat to St Bernard's, aged 45.
