= James McGrahan =

English footballer

Personal information
- Full name: James McGrahan
- Date of birth: 3 March 1898
- Place of birth: Leadgate, County Durham England
- Height: 5 ft 8 in (1.73 m)
- Positions: Wing half; centre half

Senior career*
Years	Team	Apps	(Gls)
- Leadgate Park
1922–1923	Lincoln City	25	(1)
1923–1924	Wigan Borough	34	(1)
1924–1925	Boston Town		
1925–1927	Lincoln City	26	(0)
1927–19??	Scarborough		

Managerial career
- 1948–1949: Boston United
- * Club domestic league appearances and goals

James McGrahan (3 March 1898 – after 1948), also known as Jimmy McGrahan or McGraham, was an English footballer who made 85 appearances in the Football League playing for Lincoln City (in two spells) and Wigan Borough. He played as a wing half or centre half.

== Life and career ==
McGrahan was born in Leadgate, County Durham, and began his football career with Leadgate Park. He moved into the Football League with Lincoln City, and made his debut in the Third Division North on 26 August 1922 in a 3–1 home defeat to Halifax Town. He played 25 League matches before, with the club in financial difficulties later that same season, he and full-back Yaffer Ward left for Wigan Borough. He played 34 League matches, then, after requesting a transfer, signed for Boston Town, where he made his debut in October 1924. McGrahan returned to Lincoln City a year later, and played a further 26 League matches before joining Midland League club Scarborough as player-coach in 1927.

He was later associated with Fleetwood and Portadown football clubs, was a scout for Notts County, and coached at Fylde Rugby Club, before succeeding Fred Tunstall as manager of Boston United in 1948, a post he left the following year.
