= 1919–20 Scottish Cup =

Tournament details
- Country: Scotland

Final positions
- Champions: Kilmarnock
- Runners-up: Albion Rovers

The 1919–20 Scottish Cup was the 42nd staging of Scotland's most prestigious football knockout competition. The Cup was won by Kilmarnock who defeated Albion Rovers in the final.

== Fourth round ==
Team One	Team Two	Score
Albion Rovers	Aberdeen	2-1
Morton	Third Lanark	3-0
Armadale	Kilmarnock	1-2
Rangers	Celtic	1-0

== Semi-finals ==
27 March 1920

Albion Rovers	1–1	Rangers
		Paterson

Celtic Park, Glasgow
Attendance: 32,000

27 March 1920

Kilmarnock	3–2	Greenock Morton

Hampden Park, Glasgow
Attendance: 50,000

=== Replay ===
31 March 1920

Rangers	0–0	Albion Rovers

Celtic Park, Glasgow
Attendance: 37,000

==== Second replay ====
7 April 1920

Albion Rovers	2–0	Rangers

Celtic Park, Glasgow
Attendance: 53,000

== Final ==
17 April 1920

Kilmarnock	3–2	Albion Rovers
Culley; Shortt; Smith		Watson; Hillhouse

Hampden Park, Glasgow
Attendance: 95,000

=== Teams ===
Kilmarnock:
GK	Tom Blair
RB	Tom Hamilton
LB	Dave Gibson
RH	John Bagan
CH	Mattha Shortt
LH	Robert Neave
OR	Johnny McNaught
IR	Mattha Smith
CF	Jack Smith
IL	Willie Culley
OL	Malcolm McPhail

Albion Rovers:
GK	Joe Short
RB	Robert Penman
LB	John Bell
RH	James Wilson
CH	John Black
LH	Andrew Ford
OR	Bill Ribchester
IR	James White
CF	Jock White
IL	Guy Watson
OL	Willie Hillhouse

== See also ==
- 1919–20 in Scottish football
