= Bill Culley =

Scottish footballer

Personal information
- Full name: William Neill Culley
- Date of birth: 26 August 1892
- Place of birth: Kilwinning, Scotland
- Date of death: 9 November 1955 (aged 63)
- Place of death: Irvine, Scotland
- Height: 5 ft 9 in (1.75 m)
- Position: Forward

Senior career*
Years	Team	Apps	(Gls)
1909–1910	Kilwinning Eglinton		
1910–1911	Kilwinning Rangers		
1911–1912	Ardrossan Winton Rovers		
1912–1923	Kilmarnock	189	(74)
1915	→ Third Lanark (loan)		
1916	→ Renton (loan)		
1917	→ Airdrieonians (loan)		
1923–1924	Clyde	25	(5)
1924–1926	Weymouth		
1926–1928	Bristol Rovers	57	(42)
1928	Swindon Town	3	(1)
1929–1931	Kilmarnock	0	(0)
1930	→ Galston (loan)		
1931–1933	Kilwinning Eglinton		

International career
1919	Scottish League XI	1	(1)

Managerial career
- 1929: Kilmarnock (reserves)
- * Club domestic league appearances and goals

William Neill Culley (26 August 1892 – 9 November 1955), sometimes known as Willie Culley or Bill Culley, was a Scottish professional footballer, best remembered for his two spells as a forward in the Scottish League with Kilmarnock, for whom he made over 200 appearances. He also played in the Football League for Bristol Rovers and Swindon Town and represented the Scottish League XI. Later in his career, Culley served as reserve team manager at Kilmarnock.

== Personal life ==
Culley died in 1955 in Irvine, Scotland, after experiencing heart problems.

== Career statistics ==
Appearances and goals by club, season and competition
Club	Season	League			National Cup		Total	
Club	Season	Division	Apps	Goals	Apps	Goals	Apps	Goals
Kilmarnock	1911–12	Scottish First Division	4	0	0	0	4	0
Kilmarnock	1912–13	Scottish First Division	27	6	2	0	29	6
Kilmarnock	1913–14	Scottish First Division	21	7	0	0	21	7
Kilmarnock	1914–15	Scottish First Division	31	12	0	0	31	12
Kilmarnock	1919–20	Scottish First Division	26	14	5	3	31	17
Kilmarnock	1920–21	Scottish First Division	24	5	2	1	26	3
Kilmarnock	1921–22	Scottish First Division	40	20	2	3	42	23
Kilmarnock	1922–23	Scottish First Division	16	10	2	1	18	11
Kilmarnock	Total		189	74	13	8	202	82
Clyde	1922–23	Scottish First Division	9	3	—		9	3
Clyde	1923–24	Scottish First Division	16	2	1	0	17	2
Clyde	Total		25	5	1	0	26	5
Swindon Town	1928–29	Third Division South	3	1	0	0	3	1
Career total			217	80	14	8	231	88

== Honours ==
Kilmarnock

- Scottish Cup: 1919–20

Individual

- Kilmarnock Hall of Fame
