= Billy Bowie =

Scottish businessman (born 1966)

- Born: William Davidson Bowie; 2 February 1966 (age 60); Stewarton, Ayrshire, Scotland
- Other name: Billy Bowie
- Occupation: Businessman
- Years active: 1997–present
- Known for: Owner and majority shareholder of Kilmarnock F.C. Managing director of Billy Bowie Tankers

William Davidson Bowie (born 2 February 1966 in Stewarton, Ayrshire) is a Scottish businessman who is currently owner and majority shareholder of Scottish Premiership football club Kilmarnock F.C. and managing director of Billy Bowie Tankers Ltd.

== Career ==
=== Billy Bowie Tankers Ltd. ===
On 17 April 1997, Bowie was appointed company director of the company he established in 1991, Billy Bowie Tankers Ltd, a company that undertakes the collection and treatment of non-hazardous waste. Since the companies establishment in 1991, Billy Bowie Tankers Ltd. has opened a number of branches throughout the United Kingdom, including in Widnes and Sheffield. As of 2021, the company operates depots covering 90% of the United Kingdom.

=== Kilmarnock F.C. ===
In 1997, Bowie's company, Billy Bowie Tankers, started sponsoring local football club Kilmarnock F.C., after Bowie personally sponsored the club for a number of years. In 2013, Bowie was appointed to the board of directors of Kilmarnock Football Club. Upon his appointment to the board, Bowie sought to end the conflict between then club owner Michael Johnston and the club's fans by investing £1.3 million into the club.

In 2019, Michael Johnston sold his remaining shares in the club to Bowie, making Bowie the main shareholder and the club's owner.

It was revealed in 2021 that, under Bowie's ownership, the club had been forced to apply to the Scottish Government for a loan sum of £1 million as the club are expected to post a seven-figure loss as a result of the effects of the COVID-19 pandemic in Scotland.

== Personal life ==
Bowie currently resides in Stewarton, East Ayrshire.

== See also ==
- Kilmarnock F.C.
