= Jack Martin (footballer, born 1904) =

English footballer

Personal information
- Full name: John Martin
- Date of birth: 10 December 1904
- Place of birth: Bishop Auckland, England
- Date of death: March 1984 (aged 79)
- Place of death: Gateshead, England
- Height: 5 ft 9 1/2 in (1.77 m)
- Position: Outside left

Senior career*
Years	Team	Apps	(Gls)
–	Hebburn Colliery		
192?–1924	Darlington	6	(0)
1924–1926	Leeds United	2	(0)
1926–1928	Accrington Stanley	44	(8)
1928–1929	Connahs Quay & Shotton		
1929–1930	Bury	1	(1)
1930–193?	Reading	0	(0)
–	Guildford City		
1931–1934	Doncaster Rovers	26	(5)
- * Club domestic league appearances and goals

John Martin (10 December 1904 – March 1984) was an English footballer who played as an outside left in the Football League for Darlington, Leeds United, Accrington Stanley, Bury and Doncaster Rovers. He was on the books of Reading, without playing League football for them, and played non-league football for Hebburn Colliery, Connahs Quay & Shotton – with whom he won the Welsh Cup in 1929 – and Guildford City.
