= Alfred Kellett =

English footballer (1903–1970)

Alfred Kellett (22 May 1903 – 1970) was an English footballer who played as a centre half for Rochdale. He also played for the reserve teams of Preston North End and Wigan Borough.
