= Ted Wade (footballer, born 1901) =

English footballer

Personal information
- Full name: Edward Wade
- Date of birth: 29 September 1901
- Place of birth: Blackpool, England
- Height: 5 ft 6 1/4 in (1.68 m)
- Position: Inside forward

Senior career*
Years	Team	Apps	(Gls)
1922–1923	Burnley	0	(0)
1924–1928	New Brighton	72	(24)
1928–1929	Exeter City	9	(5)
Total		81	(29)
- * Club domestic league appearances and goals

Edward Wade (born 29 September 1901, date of death unknown) was an English professional footballer who played as an inside forward. He started his career with Burnley, but failed to make an appearance for the club and left at the end of the 1922–23 season. In the summer of 1924, he joined Football League Third Division North side New Brighton, where he scored 24 goals in 72 league games over a four-year period. At the start of the 1928–29 season, he signed for Third Division South outfit Exeter City, where he played nine matches, scoring five league goals. He left Exeter City in 1929, and subsequently had a spell in non-league football with Aldershot.

== Bibliography ==
- Joyce, Michael (2004). Football League Players' Records 1888-1939. SoccerData.
