= Harry Alcock =

English footballer

Personal information
- Date of birth: 1905
- Place of birth: Walsall, England
- Position: Outside right

Senior career*
Years	Team	Apps	(Gls)
1925–1926	Walsall	45	(13)
- * Club domestic league appearances and goals

Harry Alcock was a footballer who played in the Football League for Walsall. He was born in Walsall, England.
