= Griffith Owen =

English footballer (1902–1949)

Griffith Lloyd Owen (1902–1949) was an English footballer who played as a centre forward for Hull City and Rochdale. His career began at Liverpool with their reserve team.
