= John Hillhouse =

Scottish footballer

Personal information
- Full name: John Hillhouse
- Date of birth: 14 January 1898
- Place of birth: Hurlford, Scotland
- Date of death: 8 October 1972 (aged 74)
- Position: Wing half

Senior career*
Years	Team	Apps	(Gls)
- Nithsdale Wanderers
- Arthurlie
- Rochdale
- Notts County
- * Club domestic league appearances and goals

John Hillhouse (14 January 1898 – 8 October 1972) was a Scottish footballer who played in the English Football League as a wing half for Rochdale and Notts County, as well as non-league football for a number of other teams. In his native Scotland, his clubs included Nithsdale Wanderers and Arthurlie. His cousins Willie and Hugh, who grew up on the same street in Hurlford, were also footballers.
