= Jackie Stephenson =

English footballer

Personal information
- Full name: John Stephenson
- Date of birth: 1 June 1899
- Place of birth: Crawcrook, England
- Date of death: 1969 (aged 69–70)
- Position: Inside forward

Senior career*
Years	Team	Apps	(Gls)
1921–1922	Crawcrook Amateurs		
1922–1923	Prudhoe Castle		
1923–1924	Craghead United		
1924–1928	Durham City	121	(19)
1928–1929	Norwich City	19	(2)
1929–1930	Hartlepools United	11	(0)
1931–1932	Crawcrook Albion		
1932–1933	Cork		
1933–1934	Wallsend		
1934	West Stanley		
Total		151	(21)
- * Club domestic league appearances and goals

John Stephenson (1 June 1899 – 1979) was an English footballer who played in the Football League for Durham City, Hartlepools United and Norwich City.
