= George Waite =

English footballer

Personal information
- Full name: George Henry Waite
- Date of birth: 1 March 1894
- Place of birth: Bradford, West Riding of Yorkshire, England
- Date of death: q2 1972
- Place of death: Bradford, West Riding of Yorkshire, England
- Height: 5 ft 8 in (1.73 m)
- Positions: Inside forward; centre forward; outside forward

Senior career*
Years	Team	Apps	(Gls)
–1915	Royal Artillery		
1915–1920	Bradford Park Avenue	6	(0)
1920–1921	Raith Rovers	24	(12)
1920	→ Hearts (loan)		
1921	Clydebank	3	(2)
1921–1922	Pontypridd		
1922–1923	Leicester City	28	(12)
1923–1926	Clapton Orient	62	(9)
1926–1927	Hartlepools United	26	(7)
1927–1928	York City	39	(8)
Total		188	(50)
- * Club domestic league appearances and goals

George Henry Waite (1 March 1894 – q2 1972) was an English professional footballer who played as an inside forward, a centre forward or an outside forward in the Football League for Bradford Park Avenue, Leicester City, Clapton Orient and Hartlepools United, in non-League football for Royal Artillery, Pontypridd and York City and in Scottish football for Raith Rovers, Hearts and Clydebank.
