= Jack Hall (footballer, born 1902) =

English footballer

John Hall (born 1902) was an English footballer who played as a wing half for Rochdale.
