= Lester Marshall =

English footballer

Personal information
- Full name: Lester Marshall
- Date of birth: 4 February 1902
- Place of birth: Castleford, West Riding of Yorkshire, England
- Date of death: 22 October 1956 (aged 54)
- Place of death: Scarborough, North Riding of Yorkshire, England
- Height: 6 ft 0 in (1.83 m)
- Positions: Full back; half-back; centre forward

Senior career*
Years	Team	Apps	(Gls)
1920–1922	Rowntrees		
1922–1923	Selby Town		
1923–1925	York City	21	(10)
1925–1927	Lincoln City	19	(6)
1927–1928	Scarborough		
1928–1929	York City	46	(0)
Total		86	(16)
- * Club domestic league appearances and goals

Lester Marshall (4 February 1902 – 22 October 1956) was an English professional footballer who played as a full back, half-back or a centre forward in the Football League for Lincoln City and in non-League football for Rowntrees, Selby Town, York City and Scarborough.
