= Ernest Higginbotham =

English footballer

Personal information
- Place of birth: Sheffield, England
- Position: Wing half

Senior career*
Years	Team	Apps	(Gls)
1925–1927	Rotherham United	26	(9)
- * Club domestic league appearances and goals

Ernest Higginbotham was an English footballer who played in the Football League for Rotherham United.
