= Harold Taylor (footballer, born 1902) =

English footballer (1902–1963)

Personal information
- Full name: Harold William Taylor
- Date of birth: 18 November 1902
- Place of birth: Frizinghall, England
- Date of death: 1963 (aged 60–61)
- Position: Wing-half

Senior career*
Years	Team	Apps	(Gls)
1919–1920	Little Horton Moravian Church		
1920–1921	Marshfield Athletic		
1921–1932	Bradford Park Avenue	335	(15)
1932–1933	Southport	24	(1)
1933	Oldham Athletic	0	(0)
1933–1935	Stockport County	9	(0)
1935–1936	Chesterfield	0	(0)
1936–1937	Bradford Park Avenue	0	(0)
Total		368	(16)
- * Club domestic league appearances and goals

Harold William Taylor (18 November 1902 – 1963) was an English footballer who played in the Football League for Bradford Park Avenue, Southport and Stockport County.
