= Ted Worrall =

English footballer

Personal information
- Full name: John Edwin Worrall
- Date of birth: 2 October 1891
- Place of birth: Buxton, England
- Date of death: 1980 (aged 88–89)
- Position: Full-back

Senior career*
Years	Team	Apps	(Gls)
1908–1910	The Comrades (Buxton)		
1910–1915	The Wednesday	105	(0)
1919–1923	Fulham	88	(0)
1923–1925	Aberdare Athletic	50	(1)
1925	Watford	4	(0)
1925–1927	New Brighton	84	(2)
1927–1929	Southport	71	(4)
1929–1930	Shirebrook		
1930–1931	Gresley Rovers		
1931	Ripley Town		
Total		402	(7)
- * Club domestic league appearances and goals

John Edwin Worrall (2 October 1891 – 1980) was an English footballer who played in the Football League for Aberdare Athletic, Fulham, New Brighton, Southport, The Wednesday and Watford.
