= Harry Sargeaunt =

English footballer

Personal information
- Full name: Henry Sargeaunt
- Date of birth: 2 January 1892
- Place of birth: Richmond, Yorkshire
- Date of death: 1960 (aged 67–68)
- Place of death: Gateshead, Tyne and Wear
- Position: Inside forward

Senior career*
Years	Team	Apps	(Gls)
–1920	Felling Colliery		
1920–1921	Hull City	19	(8)
1922	Brighton & Hove Albion	0	(0)
- Seaton Delaval
1926–1927	Durham City	28	(7)
Total		47	(15)
- * Club domestic league appearances and goals

Henry Sargeaunt (2 January 1892 – 1960) was an English footballer who played for Hull City and Durham City in the Football League.

Sargeaunt was born in Richmond, Yorkshire, and worked as a slater mechanic in Newcastle On Tyne. His father, Henry Edward George Sargeaunt, was a musician born in Toronto who served in the military. His father was killed in 1915 while serving with the Durham Light Infantry.
