= Bob Schofield =

English footballer (1904–1978)

Robert Schofield (7 November 1904 – 1978) was an English footballer who played as an inside forward for Rochdale, Halifax Town and Accrington Stanley.
