= Albert Whitehurst =

English footballer (1898–1976)

Personal information
- Full name: Albert John Whitehurst
- Date of birth: 22 June 1898
- Place of birth: Fenton, England
- Date of death: 1976 (aged 78)
- Height: 5 ft 9 1/2 in (1.77 m)
- Position: Centre forward

Senior career*
Years	Team	Apps	(Gls)
- New Haden Colliery
1920–1923	Stoke	18	(4)
1923–1928	Rochdale	169	(117)
1928–1929	Liverpool	8	(2)
1929–1931	Bradford City	38	(30)
1931–1933	Tranmere Rovers	80	(29)
Total		313	(182)
- * Club domestic league appearances and goals

Albert John Whitehurst (22 June 1898 – 1976) was an English footballer who played in the Football League for Bradford City, Liverpool, Rochdale, Stoke and Tranmere Rovers.

Whitehurst played for five professional clubs during his career and was a prolific scorer, setting club records at two of his clubs, Rochdale for goals in a season and Bradford City for the number of goals in a game as well as a then-record goals in a season.

== Playing career ==
Whitehurst was born in Fenton and started his career at his works football team New Haden Colliery, before moving to Stoke in 1920. He played 11 times in 1920–21 scoring twice and played six matches in 1921–22 again getting on the score sheet twice but he manages just one appearance in 1922–23 and was sold to Rochdale. Whitehurst played five seasons for Rochdale scoring a total of 117 league goals, including a club record 46 goals in 43 games in 1926–27 as the "Dale" agonisingly missed out on promotion.

He moved to Liverpool, where he played just eight times scoring twice, before moving onto Bradford City. Despite starting in just 38 games, he scored 30 goals. He scored twice in both his first games, before scoring seven in his fourth game against Tranmere Rovers on 6 March 1929. He scored another two hat-tricks that season as City earned promotion from Football League Third Division North. His seven goals in one game is a Bradford City record. He left the following season to join his final club Tranmere Rovers where he played in 90 matches scoring 35 goals.

== Career statistics ==
Appearances and goals by club, season and competition
Club	Season	League			FA Cup		Total	
Club	Season	Division	Apps	Goals	Apps	Goals	Apps	Goals
Stoke	1920–21	Second Division	11	2	0	0	11	2
Stoke	1921–22	Second Division	6	2	0	0	6	2
Stoke	1922–23	First Division	1	0	0	0	1	0
Stoke	Total		18	4	0	0	18	4
Rochdale	1923–24	Third Division North	35	14	2	1	37	15
Rochdale	1924–25	Third Division North	22	9	0	0	22	9
Rochdale	1925–26	Third Division North	29	18	3	0	32	18
Rochdale	1926–27	Third Division North	42	44	1	2	43	46
Rochdale	1927–28	Third Division North	41	32	2	4	43	36
Rochdale	Total		169	117	8	7	177	124
Liverpool	1928–29	First Division	8	2	0	0	8	2
Liverpool	Total		8	2	0	0	8	2
Bradford City	1928–29	Third Division North	15	24	0	0	15	24
Bradford City	1929–30	Second Division	15	6	1	1	16	7
Bradford City	1930–31	Second Division	8	0	4	0	12	0
Bradford City	Total		38	30	5	1	43	31
Tranmere Rovers	1931–32	Third Division North	32	10	4	3	36	13
Tranmere Rovers	1932–33	Third Division North	41	14	6	3	47	17
Tranmere Rovers	1933–34	Third Division North	7	5	0	0	7	5
Tranmere Rovers	Total		80	29	10	6	90	35
Career total			313	182	23	14	336	196

== Honours ==
Bradford City

- Football League Third Division North champions: 1928–29

Stoke

- Football League Second Division runners-up: 1921–22
