= Reuben Butler =

English footballer

Reuben Butler (born 1890) was an English footballer who played as a centre forward.

Butler was born in Stillington, County Durham. His clubs included Middlesbrough, Hartlepool, Bury, Bradford City, Oldham Athletic and Crewe Alexandra. At Bradford he scored 16 goals in 40 games, with all but one of those goals coming in the 1924–25 season, when he was club's top goal-scorer, scoring nearly half of its goals, as City struggled in the bottom half of Division Two.
