= Ian Penman (producer) =

British television director

Ian Penman (died March 2021) was a British radio broadcaster, music critic, television producer and scriptwriter. As a journalist, he typically worked under the byline Ian Ravendale.

== Career history ==
North East journalist and producer Ian Penman began working for BBC's Radio Newcastle's Bedrock show in the 1970s and started writing for local and national music magazines shortly after. To avoid confusion with the NME writer of the same name (who he actually preceded as both a radio and print music journalist) Penman wrote for Sounds under the name Ian Ravendale, for Pop Star Weekly and The Sunderland and Washington Times as Rick O'Shea and The Northern Echo as Chris Coupar. Contributions to BBC Radio 1 and BBC Radio 4 were under his own name. From 1982 to 1992, Penman was a researcher, producer and director for Tyne Tees Television, Border TV and the independent sector, working with Carol Vorderman, Muriel Gray, Janet Street-Porter and many others. He also ran River City Productions, the production wing of Stonehills Studios, the North East's largest independent facilities company.

Penman was Course Leader and main lecturer of New College Durham's Music Industry Management HND for four years in the mid-1990s. Around this time he also promoted hundreds of concerts for the likes of The Bootleg Beatles, B'Eagles, U2our and Voulez Vous. Ian Penman returned to radio and television production and journalism in the late 1990s, working again for Tyne Tees and BBC Radio Newcastle. He also presented a long-running programme for Wear FM and was broadcast journalism tutor at the WOLF-FM community and Internet Radio Project. In the 2000s he concentrated on writing television drama, including Death Of A Pirate about the 1960s pop entrepreneur and pirate radio pioneer Reg Calvert. Penman works as a media and entertainment consultant, does freelance PR and media awareness training for industry, often for the Media Plus organisation. He has also taught the Media Marketing module to the University of Sunderland's Media Production MA intake.

Penman also undertook freelance corporate video scriptwriting and production work, often in conjunction with the Newcastle-based Lodestone Productions company. This included producing, directing, presenting and conducting the interviews for "Vox and Rugs and Rock n' Roll", the first sell-through DVD for The Bootleg Beatles.

Most recently, under his 'Ian Ravendale' byline Penman freelanced for a variety of music magazines including Classic Rock, AOR, The Word Vive Le Rock, Iron Fist, Fireworks, Record Collector, Classic Pop, Vinyl Guru, R&R Life, The Sunderland Post and American Songwriter, among others. He also contributed articles to travel, crime, nostalgia and general publications including Living Spain, True Crime, Master Detective, Best Of British and Cycling World. Penman had a large archive of music interviews that he conducted with bands and soloists in the 1970s and 1980s and some of these have recently been appearing on the Rock's Backpages site credited to Ian Ravendale.
