= David Parkes (footballer, born 1892) =

English footballer

Personal information
- Full name: David Parkes
- Date of birth: 17 May 1892
- Place of birth: Lye, West Midlands, England
- Date of death: 1975 (aged 83)
- Height: 5 ft 11 in (1.80 m)
- Position: Centre half

Senior career*
Years	Team	Apps	(Gls)
–	Newcastle Town		
1913–1914	Brighton & Hove Albion	33	(0)
1914–1919	Sheffield Wednesday	47	(1)
1920–1921	Stoke	6	(0)
1921	Llanelly		
1922–1927	Rochdale	209	(11)
1928–1929	Macclesfield	30	(0)
- * Club domestic league appearances and goals

David Parkes (17 May 1892 – 1975) was an English footballer who played in the Football League for Sheffield Wednesday, Rochdale and Stoke.

== Career ==
Parkes was born in Lye and played for Newcastle Town and Brighton & Hove Albion before joining Sheffield Wednesday in 1914. He was a regular in the Wednesday side in 1914–15 as they achieved a 7th-place finish in the First Division. His career was interrupted by World War I and once League football had been resumed in 1919–20 Parkes had lost his place in the side. He left for Stoke in July 1920 however he failed to make much of an impact and after making just six appearances in 1920–21 he left for Welsh side Llanelly. He then moved to Rochdale where he spent six seasons making 219 appearances for the "Dale" before ending his career with Macclesfield.

== Career statistics ==
Club	Season	League			FA Cup		Total	
Club	Season	Division	Apps	Goals	Apps	Goals	Apps	Goals
Sheffield Wednesday	1913–14	First Division	10	0	0	0	10	0
Sheffield Wednesday	1914–15	First Division	29	1	3	0	32	1
Sheffield Wednesday	1919–20	First Division	8	0	0	0	8	0
Sheffield Wednesday	Total		47	1	3	0	50	0
Stoke	1920–21	Second Division	6	0	0	0	6	0
Rochdale	1922–23	Third Division North	35	3	1	0	36	3
Rochdale	1923–24	Third Division North	42	1	1	0	43	1
Rochdale	1924–25	Third Division North	41	1	2	0	43	1
Rochdale	1925–26	Third Division North	34	1	3	1	37	2
Rochdale	1926–27	Third Division North	28	3	1	0	29	3
Rochdale	1927–28	Third Division North	29	2	2	0	31	2
Rochdale	Total		209	11	10	1	219	12
Macclesfield	1928–29	Cheshire League	30	0	7	0	37	0
Career Total			292	12	20	1	312	13
