= Kilmarnock F.C. =

Association football club in Kilmarnock, Scotland

Kilmarnock
- Full name: Kilmarnock Football Club
- Nicknames: Killie; The Pride of Ayrshire
- Founded: 5 January 1869; 157 years ago
- Ground: Rugby Park
- Capacity: 15,003
- Coordinates: 55°36′16″N 4°30′30″W
- Owner: The Kilmarnock Football Club Ltd.
- Chairman: Billy Bowie
- Manager: Neil McCann
- League: Scottish Premiership
- 2025–26: Scottish Premiership, 10th of 12
- Website: www.kilmarnockfc.co.uk
Home colours	Away colours

Kilmarnock Football Club is a Scottish professional football team based in the town of Kilmarnock in East Ayrshire, that currently plays in the Scottish Premiership. The club has achieved several honours since its formation in 1869, most recently the 2011–12 Scottish League Cup after a 1–0 win over Celtic at Hampden Park and the Scottish Championship title in 2022. The club nickname, Killie, is the Scottish term for the town of Kilmarnock.

The club have qualified for European competitions on nine occasions, their best performance coming in the 1966–67 Fairs Cup when they progressed to the semi-finals, eventually being eliminated by Leeds United. The club is also one of only a few Scottish clubs to have played in three European competitions (European Cup, Cup Winners' Cup and the UEFA Cup). Additionally, the club have played in the International Soccer League four times – 1960, 1961, 1963 and 1965, as well as competing in the 1995 Korea Cup. Their most recent appearance in European competition football was during the 2024–25 UEFA Europa League and 2024–25 UEFA Conference League.

Kilmarnock Football Club is currently the oldest football club in the Scottish Premiership, and also the second-oldest professional club in Scotland. Home matches are played at Rugby Park, a 15,003 capacity all-seater stadium situated in the town itself. Kilmarnock took part in the first-ever official match in the Scottish Cup against the now-defunct Renton in 1873. With a long-standing football rivalry with fellow Ayrshire side Ayr United, both teams play frequently in the Ayrshire derby, first meeting in September 1910.

== History ==
=== Formation and early years ===
A history of Kilmarnock FC's overall league position from 1895 to 2025

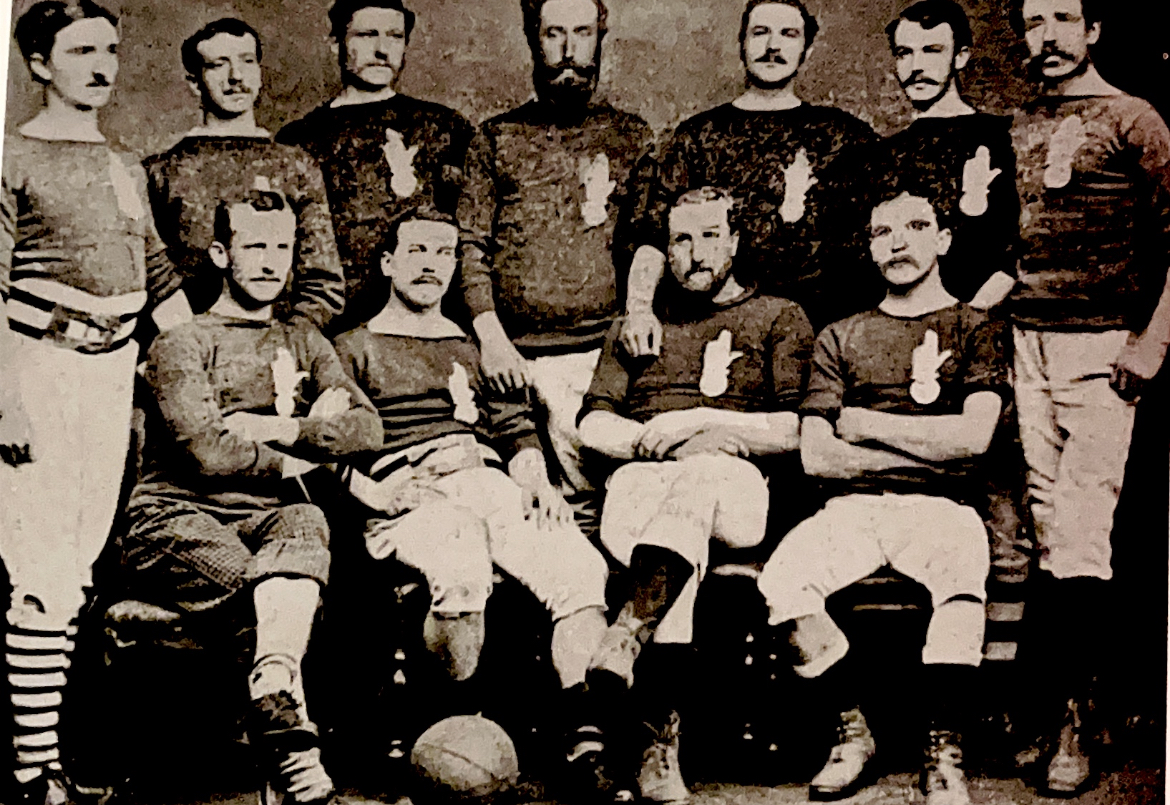
Earliest known photograph of Kilmarnock Football Club, 1878–1879

The club's foundation dates back to the very earliest days of organised football in Scotland, with speculation over the club's beginnings being in 1868, 1869 or 1872 often disputed. The club was founded by a collection of men and boys who were sporting enthusiasts, with a few of them playing cricket during the summer months, as well as playing bowls, quoits, running and golf. During the winter period, the group lacked active sporting opportunities, and in the Autumn of 1868, the younger members of the sporting enthusiasts who attended Kilmarnock Academy first played football in the Barbadoes Green area of Kilmarnock. Football in Scotland at this time was considered "rough" and "disorderly", and, while it was popular, it had never been played in an organised manner before. The group of sporting enthusiasts later became known as the club's "founding fathers", and began playing football with their own set of rules which were more similar to that of Rugby league, rather than association rules, which had become the rules used for a similar game, also known as football, in England in the late 1850s. A committee was formed with the intention of the game becoming more organised, and after raising money, had placed an advertisement in the 2 January 1869 issue of the Kilmarnock Standard for a general meeting of the "Kilmarnock Foot-ball Club" to be held in Robertson's Temperance Hotel on Portland Road in Kilmarnock on Tuesday 5 January 1869. The advert read: "Parties wishing to become members may do so at the meeting, or at the Secretary's, 55 King Street". No official recorded minutes or outcomes of the meeting are known to have existed.

With no recorded minutes of the meeting having taken place in January 1869, it is assumed that the members continued to play amongst themselves and with their own set of rugby-inspired rules. On 25 October 1872, a meeting was held by the committee at the George Hotel, Kilmarnock. Recorded minutes from the meeting highlighted that interest in the game had increased as had the membership, leading to the decision being made to officially constitute the club as "Kilmarnock Football Club", with a set of rules to play the game of football properly to be purchased, as no other clubs were playing "football" in the same style that the club had been playing up until that point. A meeting held by the committee on 29 October 1872 saw the agreement between the club and a gentleman, Mr. Wright, to rent his field nearby for £3, which they did until March 1873. A game was agreed to be played on the field on 2 November 1872, but no result or opponent to Kilmarnock Football Club were ever recorded. In November 1872, the club decided to formally adopt the rugby union rules they had purchased for use in the game. On 7 December 1872, Kilmarnock Football Club played their first known competitive game using the rugby union rules. The game was an 11-a-side game against Kilmarnock Cricket Club Xl which ended in a 0–0 draw.

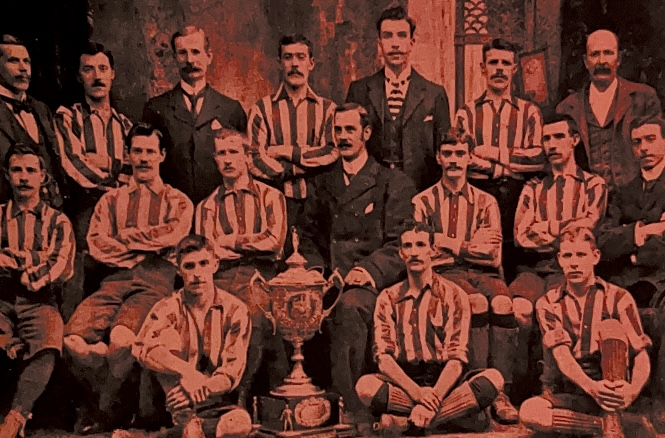
Kilmarnock win the Scottish Qualifying Cup, 1897

During a club meeting on 3 March 1873, a letter from Queen's Park asked Kilmarnock F.C. if they were interested in attending a meeting at the Dewar Hotel in Glasgow on 13 March 1873 to discuss the formation of a Scottish Football Association playing to football association rules, with the possibility of purchasing a cup for the winner of a knock out competition to take place later in 1873. Kilmarnock had long previously turned Queen's Park's requests down in the past, however, a favourable letter was returned to the team, informing the club that Kilmarnock were unable to send a representative to the meeting in Glasgow on 13 March 1873 due to having a committee meeting on the scheduled date, but advised that they were willing to join the Scottish Football Association, pledging to pay the 5 shillings membership fee and donate £1 towards the purchase of a cup for the knock-out competition. The first game played by Kilmarnock under football association rules was in the 1873–74 season. The club suffered a drastic decline in membership numbers following a fall out with their landlord at Holm Quarry, after the club wished to move back to Dundonald Road. Kilmarnock Football Club were one of the founding members of the Ayrshire Football Association which formed in May 1877. By the 1880s, Kilmarnock Football Club had established themselves as the premier club in Ayrshire.

The club had not been considered eligible for the Scottish Football League when it was formed in 1890, nor was it deemed eligible to be included in a second division. Kilmarnock Football Club was finally elected to the Scottish League in 1895, and finished their first season in the Scottish League in fourth place out of ten teams. In 1920 Kilmarnock won the Scottish Cup for the first time, beating Albion Rovers at Hampden Park. This was followed by their second success in 1929 where they beat massive favourites Rangers 2–0 at the national stadium in front of a crowd of 114,708 people. They soon reached another final against the same opposition in 1932 but this time were beaten after a replay, and the same outcome followed in the 1938 final against East Fife, Killie this time the team on the receiving end of an upset.

=== North American and European tournaments ===
After finishing as runners-up during the 1959–60 season, Kilmarnock could have been put forward as one of Scotland's entrants for the following season's European Fairs Cup. Instead, the Scottish Football Association sent the team to North America to play in the International Soccer League, serving as Scotland's representative. Kilmarnock remained unbeaten during their group matches in both New York and Jersey City, with wins over Bayern Munich and English league champions, Burnley. Kilmarnock returned to North America to play in the International Soccer League final, losing 2–0 to Brazilian club Bangu Atlético Clube.

During the 1960–61 season, Kilmarnock reached the Scottish League Cup final for the second time, where they lost to Rangers 2–0 and finished as the season's runners-up. After years of being sidelined by the Scottish Football Association, Kilmarnock were put forward for the 1964–65 European Inter-Cities Fairs Cup, losing their first match. The team made it to the second round, losing to Everton 1–4 and exiting the competition.

=== Scottish League Champions ===
Kilmarnock performed strong during the 1964–65 season, winning their first six matches in the season and remaining unbeaten in the league until December 1964. In 1964–65 Heart of Midlothian fought out a championship title race with Willie Waddell's Kilmarnock. In the era of two points for a win Hearts were three points clear with two games remaining. Hearts drew with Dundee United meaning the last game of the season with the two title challengers playing each other at Tynecastle would be a league decider. Kilmarnock needed to win by a two-goal margin to take the title. Hearts entered the game as favourites with both a statistical and home advantage.

They also had a solid pedigree of trophy-winning under Tommy Walker. Waddell's Kilmarnock in contrast had been nearly men. Four times in the previous five seasons they had finished league runners-up including Hearts' triumph in 1960. Killie had also lost three domestic cup finals during the same period including the 1962 League Cup Final defeat to Hearts. Hearts had won five of the six senior cup finals they played in under Walker. Even the final they had lost was in a replay after drawing the first game. Hearts' Roald Jensen hit the post after six minutes. Kilmarnock then scored twice through Davie Sneddon and Brian McIlroy after 27 and 29 minutes. Alan Gordon had an excellent chance to clinch the title for Hearts in second half injury time but was denied by a Bobby Ferguson diving save pushing the ball past the post. The 2–0 defeat meant Hearts lost the title by an average of 0.042 goals. Subsequently, Hearts were instrumental in pushing through a change to use goal difference to separate teams level on points. Ironically this rule change later denied Hearts the title in 1985–86. This is the only time to date Killie have been Scottish champions.

=== Korean Cup and Scottish Cup victory ===
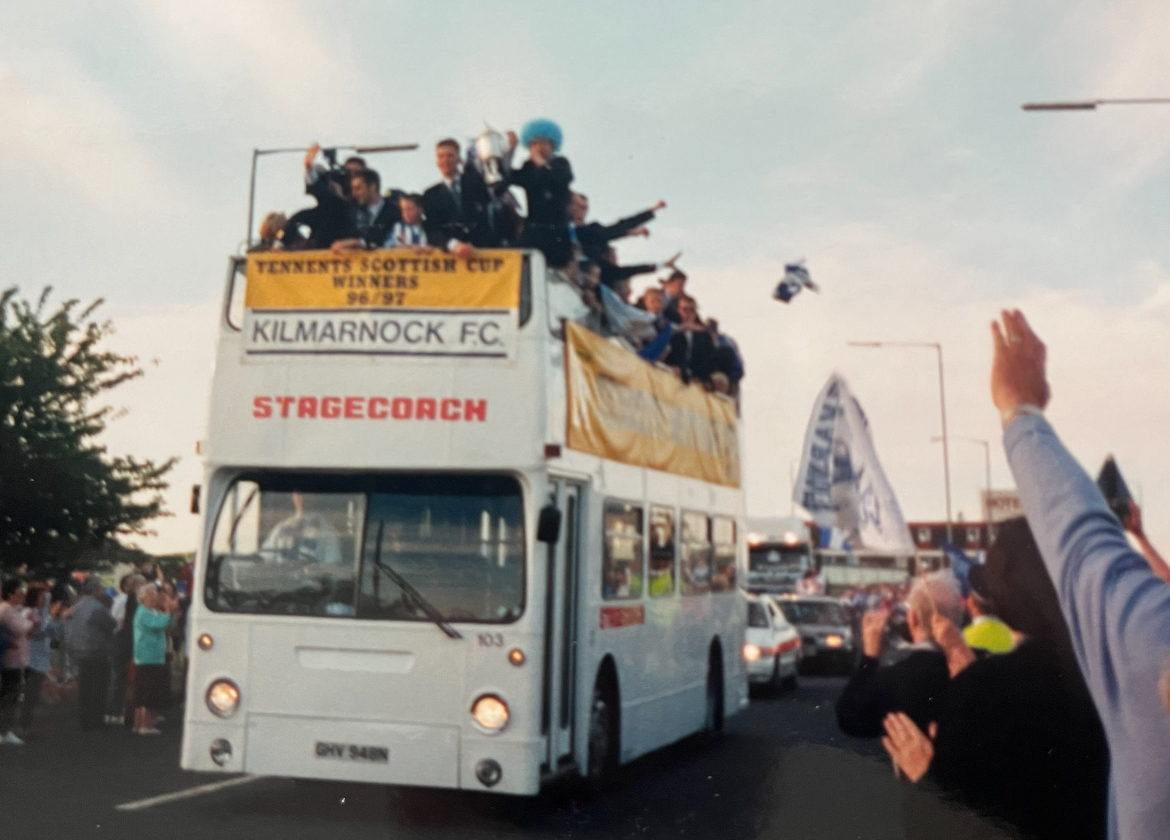
Kilmarnock F.C. arrive back in the town following their 1997 Scottish Cup final victory, 24 May 1997

Decline in the 1980s brought relegation to the Second Division, returning to the top division with promotion in 1993. In the summer of 1995, Kilmarnock were invited to South Korea to play in the Korea Cup. Kilmarnock played the Costa Rica national football team, finishing the game with a draw between both teams.

By the commencement of the 1996–97 season, optimism within the club remained low, with little to suggest that the season would see Kilmarnock win the Scottish Cup again, having previously done so 68 years prior. With inconsistent league results, and a home defeat to Raith Rovers in December 1996, Bobby Williamson became the new manager of Kilmarnock and began introducing new players to the team. Players such as David Bagan and Alex Burke were credited with improving the team's performance, along with Williamson's managerial style and approach. With relegation still a possibility, Kilmarnock climbed out of the relegation zone following a 1–1 home draw in the final league match of the season between Aberdeen. During the same period, Kilmarnock had been making good progress in the Scottish Cup, progressing to the 1997 Scottish Cup final with Falkirk held at Ibrox Stadium in Glasgow on 24 May 1997. 25,000 Kilmarnock fans attended with final, with Paul Wright scoring for Kilmarnock, allowing for Kilmarnock to claim the Scottish Cup for the third time. Following their Scottish Cup victory, the team travelled back to Kilmarnock from Glasgow on an open topped bus, travelling up the town's John Finnie Street where they were met with a barrage of fans celebrating their victory.

Victory in the Scottish Cup secured a place for Kilmarnock in the 1997–98 UEFA Cup Winners' Cup, meaning a return to European football for the club following an absence of 27 years.

=== 21st century ===
==== UEFA Cup ====
In the 2001–02 UEFA Cup, Kilmarnock travelled to Lurgan in Northern Ireland to play Glenavon, winning 1–0 following a goal by Chris Innes. In the return leg at Rugby Park, Kilmarnock won 1–0 following a goal from Ally Mitchell. In their next match, Kilmarnock faced Norwegian club Viking FK, securing a 1–1 draw at Rugby Park before suffering a 0–2 loss away from home and exiting the UEFA Cup. Kilmarnock won the Scottish Youth Cup in 2004, following a 1–0 victory over Rangers which was held at Rugby Park due to Hampden Park being unavailable to host the final.

==== 2007 and 2012 Scottish League Cup finals ====
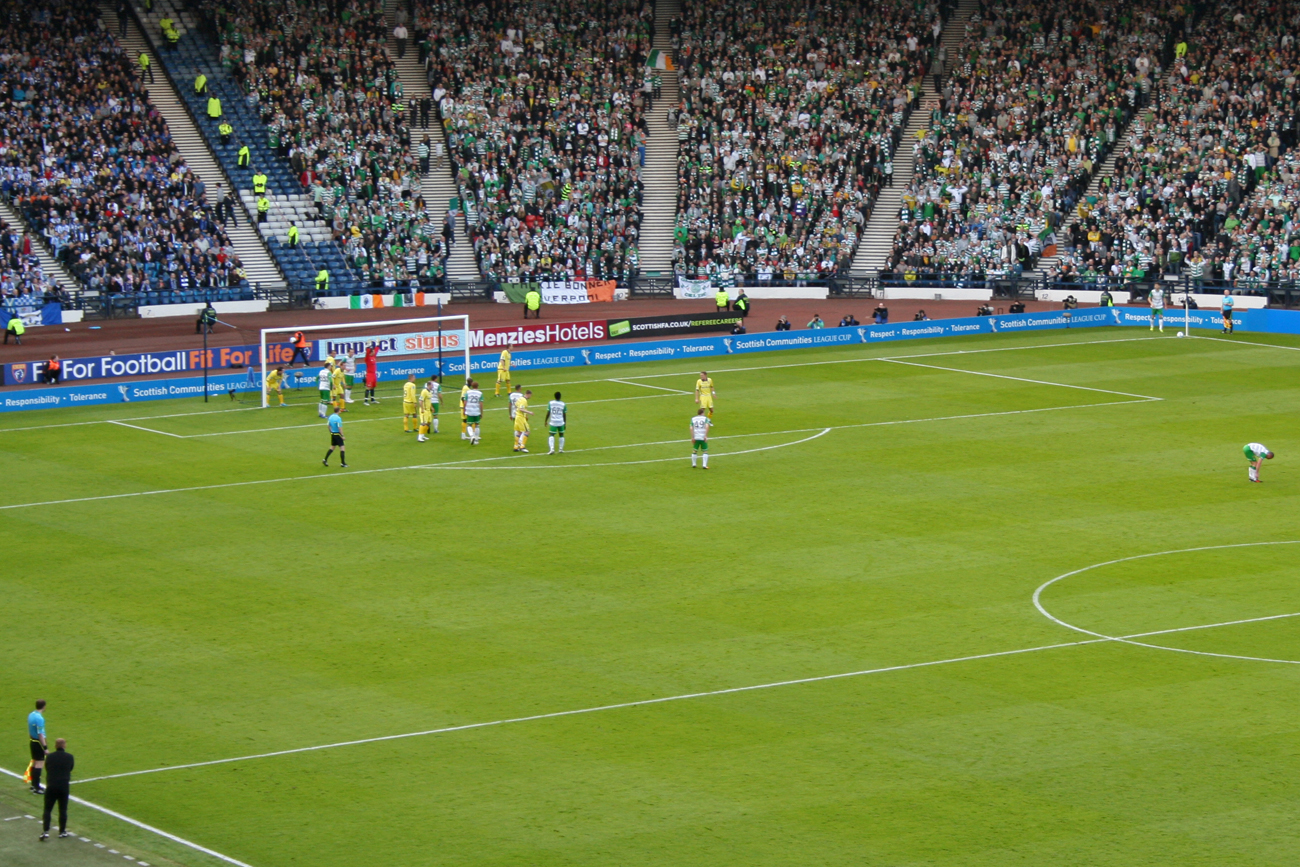
Scene from the 2012 Scottish League Cup final in which Kilmarnock beat Celtic 1–0

Kilmarnock reached the 2007 Scottish League Cup final, but suffered a 5–1 defeat in the final by Hibernian. After selling Steven Naismith to Rangers for a club-record fee in August 2007, Killie struggled in the 2007–08 Scottish Premier League, finishing in 11th place with 40 points. In January 2010, Kilmarnock were second bottom of the 2009–10 Scottish Premier League, with last placed Falkirk just two points behind. On 11 January 2010, Jim Jefferies left the club by "mutual consent" and Jimmy Calderwood was appointed manager. Kilmarnock then achieved a first win in nine years against Celtic. Continued poor form, however, meant a final day showdown at Rugby Park with Falkirk for SPL survival. Kilmarnock began the game with a two-point advantage over their rivals and a goalless draw on the day was good enough to secure top-flight football for another year. They ended the season with just 33 points, their worst points finish in the SPL.

After Calderwood left at the end of the season, Mixu Paatelainen was appointed manager for the next two years with an option for a third. Despite being the favourites for relegation that season, Kilmarnock finished the season in fifth position. Paatelainen left the club to become manager of Finland and his assistant Kenny Shiels was appointed manager. Kilmarnock progressed to the 2012 Scottish League Cup final with wins against Queen of the South, East Fife and Ayr United in an Ayrshire derby at Hampden. Kilmarnock won the League Cup for the first time, as they defeated Celtic 1–0 in the final; Dieter Van Tornhout scored the only goal six minutes from time, with goalkeeper Cammy Bell named Man of the Match. In June 2013, after three years at Kilmarnock, manager Kenny Shiels was sacked by chairman Michael Johnston after a "mutual agreement" between the two.

==== Manager changes ====
Allan Johnston signed a two-year contract and was appointed manager on 24 June 2013, with Sandy Clark as the assistant manager. Clark left his role in the summer of 2014 with the club looking to go in a new direction, and ex-Killie player and former Hearts manager Gary Locke was appointed as his assistant. Johnston was sacked in February 2015 after informing the press of his intention to leave in the summer, before discussing this with the board. Locke was placed in interim charge, before signing a three-year deal in April 2015. Kilmarnock went on to lose seven of their final eight games of the season, but were spared the play-off spot after a 4–1 win over Partick Thistle.

The 2015–16 season would prove difficult for the team. Locke was removed from his position as manager in February 2016, with Lee Clark being appointed as his replacement. Despite a small uplift in form, the team finished in 11th place and faced a relegation play-off against Championship side Falkirk in order to stay in the top flight. Despite losing 0–1 in the first leg, Killie fought back and comfortably won the second leg 4–0 (4–1 on aggregate), securing the club's status in the Scottish Premiership for another season. Clark would leave Kilmarnock for a return to England with Bury in February 2017, exactly a year after his arrival. Former Rangers player Lee McCulloch, assistant to both Locke and Clark, was placed in temporary charge until the end of the season, achieving an eighth-place finish. The following season saw another poor start, with an early defeat to rivals Ayr United in the league cup group stages, followed by a disappointing start to the league campaign. McCulloch was sacked in September 2017 with the club rooted to the bottom of the table.

==== The Clarke era ====
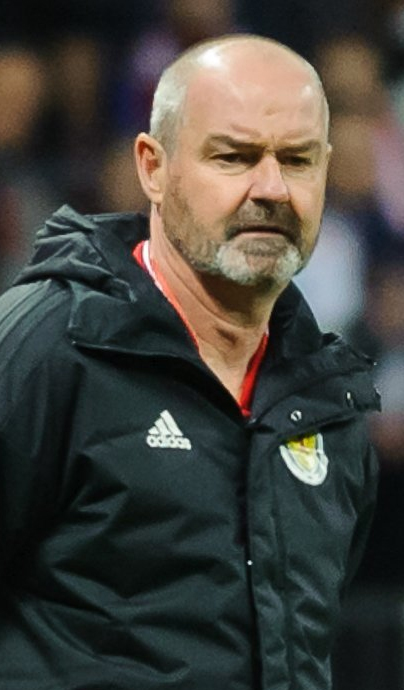
Steve Clarke, appointed manager in 2017, led the club to 3rd place in the 2018–19 Scottish Premiership and secured a place in the 2019–20 UEFA Europa League

In an unexpected move, Kilmarnock appointed former Chelsea and West Bromwich Albion coach Steve Clarke. It was Clarke's first involvement with the Scottish game in 30 years and his appointment preempted a dramatic upturn in form, with the club ultimately finishing in fifth place, earning him the SFWA Manager of the Year award in the process. The 2018–19 season saw Kilmarnock celebrate their 150th anniversary, and the team continued their strong form in the league, both home and away, culminating in a final day fixture against Rangers at Rugby Park. Kilmarnock won the match 2–1 and the result secured a third-place finish in the league, which guaranteed European football for the first time since 2001. The season's results also set a new record points total for the club and their highest placed finish in the league since 1966. The following day, Clarke was signed by the Scottish Football Association to become the head coach of the Scotland national team.

Following the departure of Steve Clarke, Kilmarnock had three managers whose spell in charge was brief, beginning with former Juventus and Chelsea assistant coach Angelo Alessio. In Alessio's second match in charge, Kilmarnock lost in Europa League qualification to Welsh Premier League club Connah's Quay Nomads. Alessio was sacked in December 2019, with the team sitting in fifth place. Following his departure, Alex Dyer, assistant coach to both Alessio and Clarke, was appointed on an initial caretaker basis until the end of the season, before all football was abruptly ended due to the COVID-19 pandemic. Dyer's services were retained by the club and he signed a new contract extension in June 2020. However, following a poor start to the new season, he left the club by mutual consent in January 2021. In February 2021, former St Johnstone manager Tommy Wright was appointed as the club's third manager in two years.

==== Relegation and Championship winners ====
On 24 May 2021, following a play−off defeat to Dundee, Kilmarnock were relegated to the Scottish Championship, bringing an end to their 28-year stay in the top flight. Their 11th-place finish and play-off defeat in 2020–21 meant it was the club's first season in the Championship, and their first in the second tier of Scottish football since 1992–93. Manager Tommy Wright made 14 permanent summer signings as he approached his first full season as Kilmarnock manager, before being sacked in December 2021 with the team sitting fifth place in the Championship. Former Aberdeen manager Derek McInnes was quickly appointed as his successor. Results improved, and by the end of the 2021–22 season, Kilmarnock were promoted back to the top flight of Scottish football at the first attempt, defeating closest challengers Arbroath 2–1 on the penultimate matchday with a dramatic last-minute winner from Blair Alston.

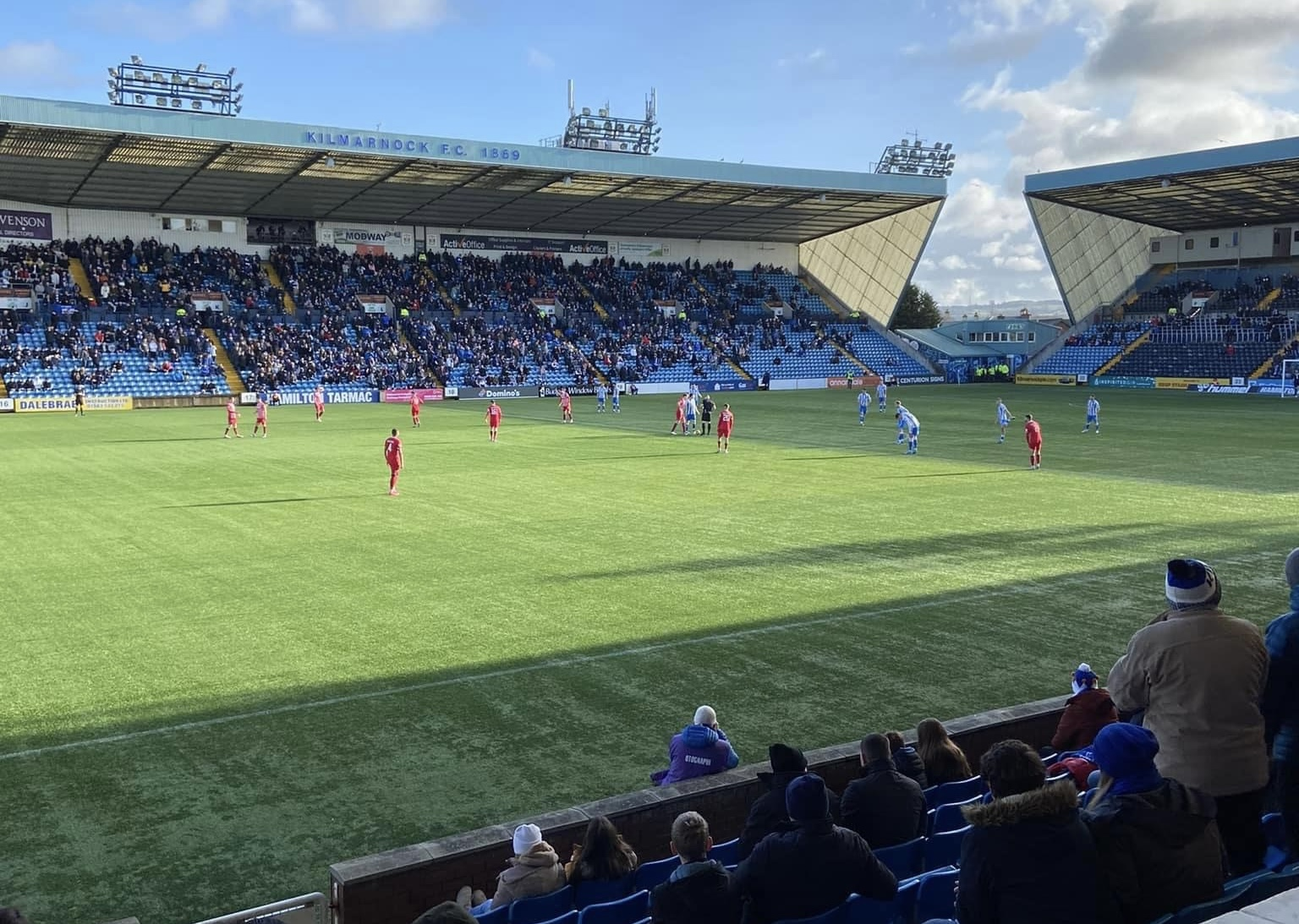
Kilmarnock against Raith Rovers, 19 February 2022. Kilmarnock won 3–0 at Rugby Park

In cup competition during the season, Kilmarnock were eliminated in the fourth round of the Scottish Cup, in the second round of the League Cup and the semi-finals of the Challenge Cup.

=== Return to Premiership ===
Following their first-place finish in the Scottish Championship in 2021–22, Kilmarnock returned to the Scottish Premiership after spending one year in the second tier. At the conclusion of the season, Kilmarnock finished 10th in the Premiership table out of 12 teams, as well as reaching the quarter finals of the Scottish Cup and the semi-final of the 2022–23 Scottish League Cup.

==== 2024–25 Europa and Conference League campaign ====
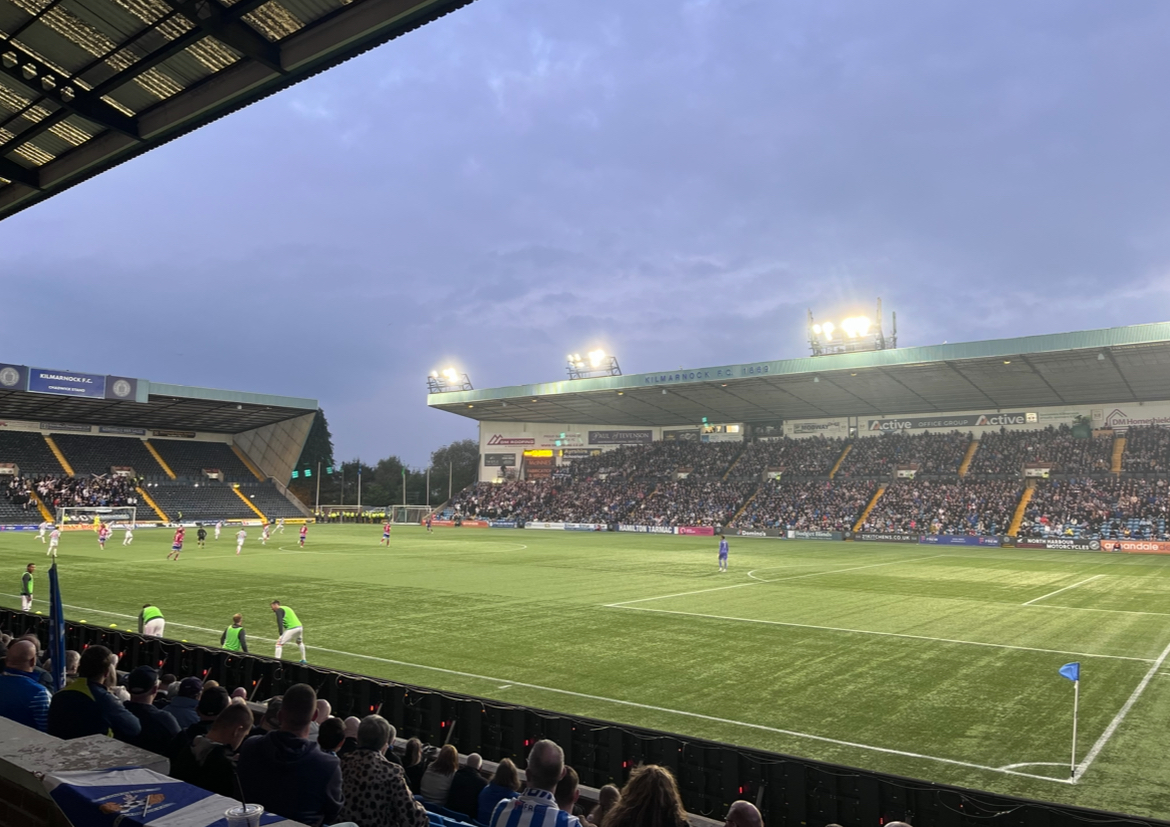
Kilmarnock v Copenhagen in the 2024–25 UEFA Conference League, 29 August 2024

After finishing the 2023–24 Scottish Premiership in fourth place, Kilmarnock secured qualification for the Europa League second qualifying round. Their first game, against Belgian team Cercle Brugge at Rugby Park on 25 July 2024, ended in a 1–1 draw with David Watson scoring for Kilmarnock in the 70th minute. On 1 August 2024, Kilmarnock played Cercle Brugge at Jan Breydelstadion in Belgium, losing to the hosts 1–0.

Following their exit from the Europa League after losing 2–1 aggregate defeat to Cercle Brugge, the team dropped to the UEFA Conference League. Their first match of the Conference League took place at Rugby Park on 8 August 2024 against Norwegian team Tromsø, which ended 2–2, with Kyle Vassell and Bobby Wales scoring for Kilmarnock in the 6th and 90th minute respectively. On 15 August 2024, Kilmarnock secured a UEFA Conference League play–off spot following a 1–0 victory in the return leg. On 22 August 2024, Kilmarnock travelled to Copenhagen, losing 2–0. They exited the Conference League on 29 August 2024, following a 1–1 draw to Copenhagen. Kilmarnock were first to score, with a Marley Watkins goal in the 16th minute, followed by an own goal by Lewis Mayo in the 68th minute.

Following the departure of Derek McInnes to Hearts, Stuart Kettlewell was appointed manager in May 2025. After a string of unsuccessful results, Kettlewell was relieved of his duties in December 2025 with "immediate effect", with the club sitting 11th out of 12 in the Scottish Premiership table. Kris Doolan was appointed as interim manager until 6 January 2026 when Neil McCann was appointed manager. A 3–1 win over Dundee on 12 May 2026 secured the club's Premiership survival and a 10th place finish.

== Ayrshire Derby ==
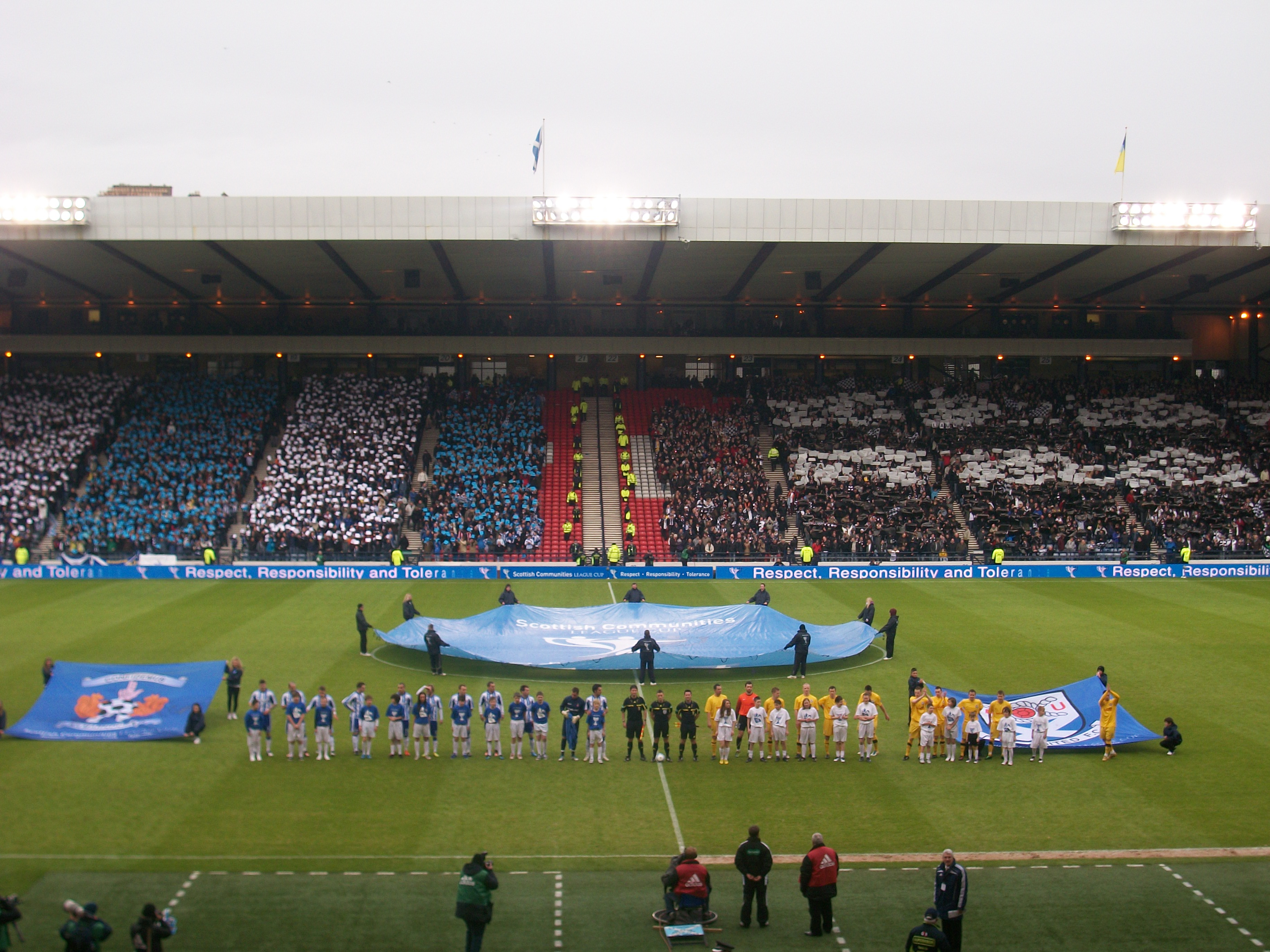
Kilmarnock and Ayr United line up for an Ayrshire derby match at Hampden Park, 2012

Kilmarnock's biggest rivalry is with their South Ayrshire neighbours, Ayr United, and together they contest the Ayrshire derby. Between national competitions such as the Scottish Football League, Scottish Cup, Scottish League Cup and the Scottish Challenge Cup, Kilmarnock have beaten Ayr United a total of 59 times, whilst beating Ayr United 43 times in defunct competitions such as the Ayrshire Cup, Ayrshire League, Ayr Charity Cup, Kilmarnock Charity Cup and the West Sound Trophy.

On 28 January 2012, Ayr United and Kilmarnock met at Hampden Park for the League Cup semi-final. Kilmarnock won 1–0 thanks to a 109th-minute goal from Dean Shiels. This was the first time that the Ayrshire derby had taken place in the semi-finals of a major competition and it was also the first derby to be played at a neutral venue. The game also achieved the highest recorded post-World War II crowd of any Ayrshire derby with 25,057 people travelling to Hampden (Kilmarnock versus Ayr United on 19 March 1938 had a crowd of 27,442).

The Ayrshire Derby fixture was revived in season 2021–22, as both clubs were in the same division following Kilmarnock's relegation to the Scottish Championship.

== Club operations ==
=== Ownership and finances ===
Since June 1906, Kilmarnock F.C. has been owned by the private limited company, The Kilmarnock Football Club Ltd. Since 2014, the majority shareholder of the club is Ayrshire businessman Billy Bowie, who oversees all operations of the club. Kilmarnock became debt-free under Bowie's control in 2017 after several years of financial difficulty.

In May 2018 Kilmarnock made a landmark move by appointing Phyllis McLeish, commercial director of the QTS Group, to the club's board; in doing so she became the first female board member in over 20 years. Later that same month, the club appointed its second female board member in Cathy Jamieson, former MP for the Kilmarnock and Loudoun district and a life-long Killie fan. Her appointment came after being nominated by The Killie Trust Initiative, who raised over £100,000 to have a member of the trust on the board.

=== Colours and badge ===
The 150th Anniversary Badge used from 2018 to 2020

The earliest known Kilmarnock kit from 1879 consisted of an all-blue jersey with white trousers. The shirt bore a crest which was described as "a hand, index and second fingers upright, thumb outstretched, other fingers enclosed over a palm" (an adoption of the historic Clan Boyd chief's heraldic crest). The hand rested on a bar over a ball marked KFC. Between 1887 and 1890 Kilmarnock wore black and white striped tops. Thereafter, the club has predominantly played in blue and white striped or hooped shirts with either blue or white shorts. The club have also occasionally played in plain blue and plain white tops; this was suggested by Ross Quigley who, at the time, was one of the first directors of the club, although the kit was later changed to the hooped style in 1920. The club's away colours have varied greatly over time. Yellow is generally regarded as the club's main third colour; but white, red and purple away kits have also appeared in recent years.

Between 2008 and 2014, the club manufactured their kits under their own sportswear brand, 1869. Following this, Italian company Erreá was the manufacturer. Kilmarnock kits were manufactured by American company Nike between 2016 and 2020. The current kit manufacturer is Danish company Hummel; it can only be bought from the store at Rugby Park.

The club badge is a modernised version of previous club badges. It features a ball bearing a hand in a blessing position, flanked by two red squirrels. The club's Latin motto, confidemus (we trust), is written above the badge (similar to the Clan Boyd heraldic motto, confido (I trust)). The club adopted the badge in 1992 after The Lord Lyon decreed that the previous badge, based heavily upon the town crest, was in breach of ancient Scottish heraldic rules.

In October 2018 the club unveiled a special badge for the club's 150th anniversary.

Kilmarnocks's first known kit from 1879
Scottish Cup winning kit from 1920 & 1929
League winning kit from 1965
Home kit from 1977 to 1989
Scottish Cup winning kit from 1997
Scottish League Cup winning away kit from 2012
150th Anniversary Kit from 2019–2020

Period	Kit manufacturer	Shirt sponsor (centre)	Shirt sponsor (sleeve)
1977–1983	Umbro	none	none
1983–1984	Umbro	AT Mays	none
1984–1985	Umbro	none	none
1985–1986	Umbro	Mitchell & Struthers	none
1986–1987	Matchwinner	Mitchell & Struthers	none
1987–1989	Matchwinner	Tourhill Joinery	none
1989–1990	Matchwinner	A-Plant Hire	none
1990–1995	Matchwinner	AT Mays	none
1995–1997	Le Coq Sportif	AT Mays	none
1997–1998	Le Coq Sportif	Sports Division	none
1998–1999	Puma	Sports Division	none
1999–2000	Puma	JJB Sports	none
2000–2001	TFG Sports	scotlandonline.com	none
2001–2006	TFG Sports	Seriously Strong	none
2006–2007	TFG Sports	Galloway Cheese	none
2007–2008	Lotto	Smallworld Cable	none
2008–2010	Killie 1869	Smallworld Cable	none
2010–2012	Killie 1869	verve.net	none
2012–2014	Killie 1869	QTS	none
2014–2016	Erreà	QTS	none
2016–2020	Nike	QTS	none
2020–2023	Hummel	Brownings The Bakers	GasSure
2023–	Hummel	James Frew	Redrock Automation

=== Club mascot ===
The club's mascot is a squirrel named 'Captain Conker', named after the squirrels which feature on the club's crest and the coat of arms of the Clan Boyd of Kilmarnock. In the past, the 'Killie Pie' mascot was also a regular at Rugby Park on matchdays. Previously, the mascot was Nutz the squirrel, played by long-time Kilmarnock fan Ian Downie who died in 2020. Downie had played the club's mascot for 19 years prior to his death.

=== Stadium ===
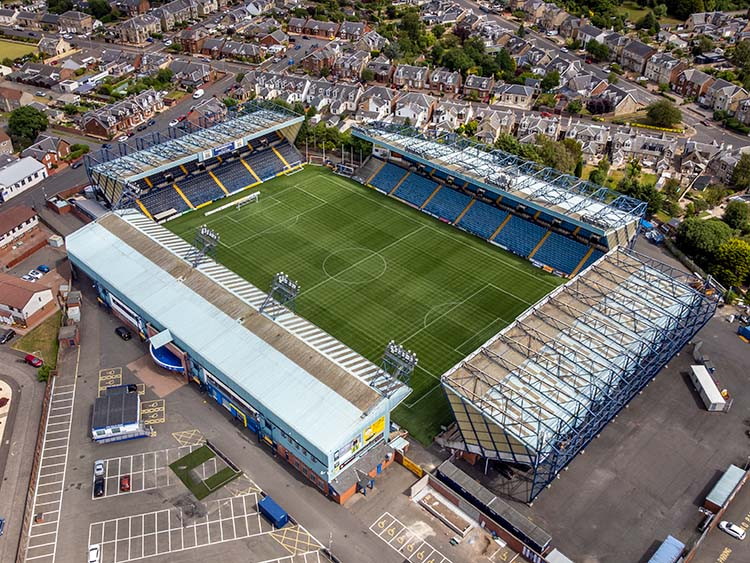
Rugby Park stadium, situated on Rugby Road, home of Kilmarnock FC

Kilmarnock first played football matches at the present Rugby Park site in 1899. Despite this, the venue is actually Kilmarnock's fourth home ground. The Grange, Holm Quarry and Ward's Park all hosted matches before the club moved to Rugby Park in 1877. This was not the present stadium, but one situated close by near South Hamilton Street. This ground was shared by cricket and rugby teams – sports which Kilmarnock had played previously – and the connection with rugby gave the ground its name. This name was taken with the club when they moved to their present stadium.

During the 1994–95 season the stadium capacity was significantly reduced as three new stands were constructed; the Moffat Stand, the Chadwick Stand and the East Stand. Their completion brought the capacity of the stadium to 15,003. The stadium opened on 6 August 1995, in a friendly match against English champions Blackburn Rovers. Mike Newell hit a hat-trick as the home team lost 5–0.

A FIFA 2 star FieldTurf artificial pitch was installed at Rugby Park for the start of the 2014–15 season. The pitch was capable of hosting rugby matches as well as football. A new artificial hybrid surface was installed during the 2019 close season. In February 2019 Kilmarnock received approval to install a new safe-standing section in areas of the East and Moffat stands. The installation process was completed in early December of that year.

In December 2022 Kilmarnock announced that consultation had begun on the plans to develop 'Bowie Park Training Facility' with a view to creating a dedicated club training ground where Kilmarnock's men's, women's and academy teams develop within the same purpose-built environment. Funded by Billy Bowie, the development features two five-a-side and two full-size pitches – one with an accompanying 500-seat stand – alongside a two-floor training facility building which hosts a gym, changing rooms, canteen / seminar room, offices and a players' lounge.

=== Club anthem ===
The song "Paper Roses", originally a hit by American singer and activist Anita Bryant, was adopted by Kilmarnock fans as their own club anthem. American singer and actress Marie Osmond, who is famous for recording this song, surprised the fans in February 2013 and performed at Rugby Park along with a meet and greet session, signing autographs for the players and fans.

== Players ==
=== First team squad ===
As of 23 October 2026

Note: Flags indicate national team as defined under FIFA eligibility rules; some limited exceptions apply. Players may hold more than one non-FIFA nationality.

No.	Pos.	Nation	Player
1	GK	POL	Max Stryjek
2	DF	SCO	Jamie Brandon
3	DF	SLE	MJ Kamson-Kamara (on loan from Hearts)
4	DF	IRL	Cathal McCarthy (on loan from Hull City)
5	MF	SCO	Mark O'Hara
6	DF	SCO	Robbie Deas
7	MF	SCO	Rory McKenzie
8	MF	SWE	Erik Ring
9	FW	ENG	Joe Hugill
10	FW	ENG	Tyreece John-Jules
11	MF	SCO	Greg Kiltie (captain)
12	GK	ENG	Calum Ferrie

No.	Pos.	Nation	Player
14	DF	NZL	George Stanger
15	DF	ENG	Johnly Yfeko
18	MF	WAL	Tom Lowery
19	DF	GER	Jonathan Meier
20	MF	MDA	Nicky Cleșcenco
21	DF	EST	Michael Schjønning-Larsen
23	MF	ENG	Roshaun Mathurin
27	FW	WAL	Ieuan Owen
29	FW	SUR	Djenairo Daniels
36	MF	COD	Aaron Tshibola
49	MF	SCO	Bailey Rice (on loan from Rangers)
58	GK	GER	Nico Mantl

=== On loan ===
Note: Flags indicate national team as defined under FIFA eligibility rules; some limited exceptions apply. Players may hold more than one non-FIFA nationality.

No.	Pos.	Nation	Player
17	FW	SCO	Scott Tiffoney (on loan at Raith Rovers)
25	DF	CAN	Ethan Schilte-Brown (on loan at Glentoran)
26	DF	SCO	Ben Brannan (on loan at Queens Park)
32	DF	SCO	Ruari Ellis (co-operation loan with Queen of the South)
35	MF	SCO	Aaron Davis (co-operation loan with Queen of the South)
38	MF	SCO	Archie Traynor (on loan at Stranraer)
39	DF	SCO	Euan Bowie (on loan at Auchinleck Talbot)
40	GK	SCO	Corey Armour (on loan at Auchinleck Talbot)

No.	Pos.	Nation	Player
42	MF	USA	Cole Coughlin (co-operation loan with Queen of the South)
—	GK	SCO	Dylan Brown (on loan at Kilwinning Rangers)
—	DF	SCO	Mitchell Spence (co-operation loan with Queen of the South)
—	MF	SCO	Noah Simpson (on loan at Gala Fairydean Rovers)
—	MF	SCO	Connor Sweeney (on loan at Albion Rovers)
—	MF	SCO	Tony Frew (on loan at Whitletts Victoria)

== Non-playing staff ==
=== Board of directors ===
Position	Name
Majority shareholder	Billy Bowie
Managing director	Phyllis Carroll
Non-executive director	Cathy Jamieson
Director	Don Bircham

=== Management ===
Position	Name
Head coach	Neil McCann
Assistant head coach	Billy Dodds
First team coach	Kirk Broadfoot
Goalkeeping coach	Conor Brennan
Head of academy	Paul Di Giacomo
Head of youth	Ryan McCann
U19 coach	Kris Doolan
Physiotherapists	Ross Goodwin; Jordan Templeton
Performance analysts	Graeme McArthur; Lee Thomson
Sports scientist	Jake Simpson
Club doctor	Hamish Simpson
Kitman	Kevin McNeill

== Managerial statistics ==
Information correct as of matches played 17 May 2026. Only official Scottish League, Scottish Cup, Scottish League Cup and European Competition matches are counted

Name	Games	Wins	Draws	Losses	Win %	League Titles	Scottish Cups	League Cups	Promotions
(Scotland) Charlie Smith (1895–1902)	159	86	26	47	54.09	0	0	0	0
(Scotland) Barrie Grieve (1906–1910)	141	41	33	67	29.08	0	0	0	0
(Scotland) James McDonald (1910–1919)	343	131	73	139	38.19	0	0	0	0
(Scotland) Hugh Spence (1919–1937)	807	312	159	336	38.66	0	2	0	0
(Scotland) Jimmy McGrory (1937–1945)	108	45	23	40	41.67	0	0	0	0
(Scotland) Tom Smith (1945–1947)	77	18	20	39	23.38	0	0	0	0
(England) Tom Mather (1947–1948)	37	15	6	16	40.54	0	0	0	0
(Scotland) Alex Hastings (1948–1950)	77	27	16	34	35.06	0	0	0	0
(Scotland) Malky MacDonald (1950–1957)	297	137	57	103	46.13	0	0	0	0
(Scotland) Willie Waddell (1957–1965)	389	215	76	98	55.27	1	0	0	0
(Scotland) Malky MacDonald (1965–1968)	141	67	30	44	47.52	0	0	0	0
(Scotland) Walter McCrae (1968–1973)	256	93	63	100	36.33	0	0	0	0
(Scotland) Davie Sneddon (1973, 1977–1981)	164	65	44	55	39.63	0	0	0	1
(Scotland) Willie Fernie (1973–1977)	184	66	49	69	35.87	0	0	0	2
(Scotland) Rab Stewart (1980, 1984)	3	3	0	0	100.00	0	0	0	0
(Scotland) Jim Clunie (1981–1984)	179	58	52	69	32.40	0	0	0	1
(Scotland) Eddie Morrison (1984–1988)	188	65	46	77	34.57	0	0	0	0
(Scotland) Jim Clark (1988)	2	1	0	1	50.00	0	0	0	0
(Scotland) Jim Fleeting (1988–1992)	162	68	43	51	41.98	0	0	0	1
(Scotland) Tommy Burns (1992–1994)	112	48	32	32	42.86	0	0	0	1
(Scotland) Alex Totten (1994–1996)	98	31	21	46	31.63	0	0	0	0
(Scotland) Bobby Williamson (1996–2002)	246	89	67	90	36.18	0	1	0	0
(Scotland) Jim Jefferies (2002–2010)	327	117	65	145	35.78	0	0	0	0
(Scotland) Jimmy Calderwood (2010)	23	7	4	12	30.43	0	0	0	0
(Finland) Mixu Paatelainen (2010–2011)	34	15	6	13	44.12	0	0	0	0
(Northern Ireland) Kenny Shiels (2011–2013)	95	27	31	37	28.42	0	0	1	0
(Scotland) Allan Johnston (2013–2015)	66	20	10	36	30.30	0	0	0	0
(Scotland) Gary Locke (2015–2016)	43	11	10	22	25.58	0	0	0	0
(England) Lee Clark (2016–2017)	44	10	13	21	22.73	0	0	0	0
(Scotland) Lee McCulloch (2016, 2017)	30	8	8	14	26.67	0	0	0	0
(Scotland) Steve Clarke (2017–2019)	79	40	17	22	50.63	0	0	0	0
(Italy) Angelo Alessio (2019)	22	8	6	8	36.36	0	0	0	0
(England) Alex Dyer (2019–2021)	43	13	5	25	30.23	0	0	0	0
(Northern Ireland) Tommy Wright (2021)	42	20	7	15	47.62	0	0	0	0
(Scotland) Derek McInnes (2022–2025)	159	61	38	60	38.36	0	0	0	1
(Scotland) Stuart Kettlewell (2025)	21	5	6	10	23.80	0	0	0	0
(Scotland) Kris Doolan (2025–2026)	4	0	1	3	0	0	0	0	0
(Scotland) Neil McCann (2026–)	17	8	3	6	47.06	0	0	0	0

== Club records and honours ==
=== Club accolades ===
- Second oldest professional club in Scotland
- Biggest competitive win: 13–2 v Saltcoats Victoria, Scottish Qualifying Cup 2nd round, 12 September 1896
- Worst defeat: 1–9 v Celtic, Scottish League Division 1, 13 August 1938
- Highest home attendance: 35,995 v Rangers, Scottish Cup Quarter-final, 10 March 1962
- Most league goals in a season: Harry Cunningham (34 in 1927–28) and Andy Kerr (34 in 1960–61)
- Transfer fee paid: £340,000 for Paul Wright from St Johnstone, March 1995
- Transfer fee received: £2,200,000 for Greg Taylor to Celtic, August 2019

=== Domestic ===
- Scottish Football League (first tier):
  - Winners (1): 1964–65
    - Runners-up (4): 1959–60, 1960–61, 1962–63, 1963–64
- Scottish First Division / Scottish Championship (second tier):
  - Winners (3): 1897–98, 1898–99, 2021–22
    - Runners-up (6): 1953–54, 1973–74, 1975–76, 1978–79, 1981–82, 1992–93
- Scottish Second Division (third tier):
  - Runners-up (1): 1989–90
- Scottish Cup:
  - Winners (3): 1919–20, 1928–29, 1996–97
    - Runners-up (5): 1897–98, 1931–32, 1937–38, 1956–57, 1959–60
- Scottish League Cup:
  - Winners (1): 2011–12
    - Runners-up (5): 1952–53, 1960–61, 1962–63, 2000–01, 2006–07
- Scottish Qualifying Cup:
  - Winners (1): 1896–97

=== Other; international and regional ===
- Inter-Cities Fairs Cup:
  - Semi-finalists: 1966–67
- International Soccer League:
  - Runners-up: 1960
- Tennent Caledonian Cup:
  - Winners: 1979–80
- UEFA Respect Fair Play ranking:
  - Winners: 1999
- Ayrshire Cup:
  - Winners (44): 1884, 1885, 1886, 1891, 1896, 1897, 1898, 1899, 1900, 1921, 1922, 1923, 1928, 1930, 1931, 1935, 1947, 1951, 1952, 1953, 1954, 1955, 1956, 1957, 1959 (shared), 1960, 1962, 1966, 1972, 1973, 1974, 1979, 1981, 1982, 1983, 1984, 1985, 1987, 1990, 1992, 1993, 1994, 1996, 1998

=== European performance record ===
Kilmarnock's score is shown first in each case

Season	Competition	Round	Opponent	Home	Away	Aggregate
1964–65	Inter-Cities Fairs Cup	First round	(Germany) Eintracht Frankfurt	5–1	0–3	5–4
1964–65	Inter-Cities Fairs Cup	Second round	(England) Everton	0–2	1–4	1–6
1965–66	European Cup	Preliminary round	(Albania) 17 Nëntori	1–0	0–0	1–0
1965–66	European Cup	First round	(Spain) Real Madrid	2–2	1–5	3–7
1966–67	Inter-Cities Fairs Cup	Second round	(Belgium) Antwerp	7–2	1–0	8–2
1966–67	Inter-Cities Fairs Cup	Third round	(Belgium) La Gantoise	1–0	2–1	3–1
1966–67	Inter-Cities Fairs Cup	Quarter-final	(East Germany) Lokomotive Leipzig	2–0	0–1	2–1
1966–67	Inter-Cities Fairs Cup	Semi-final	(England) Leeds United	0–0	2–4	2–4
1969–70	Inter-Cities Fairs Cup	First round	(Switzerland) Zürich	3–1	2–3	5–4
1969–70	Inter-Cities Fairs Cup	Second round	(Bulgaria) Slavia Sofia	4–1	0–2	4–3
1969–70	Inter-Cities Fairs Cup	Third round	(Romania) Dinamo Bacău	1–1	0–2	1–3
1970–71	Inter-Cities Fairs Cup	First round	(Northern Ireland) Coleraine	2–3	1–1	3–4
1997–98	UEFA Cup Winners' Cup	Qualifying round	(Republic of Ireland) Shelbourne	2–1	1–1	3–2
1997–98	UEFA Cup Winners' Cup	First round	(France) Nice	1–1	1–3	1–4
1998–99	UEFA Cup	First round	(Bosnia and Herzegovina) Željezničar	1–0	1–1	2–1
1998–99	UEFA Cup	Second round	(Czech Republic) Sigma Olomouc	0–2	0–2	0–4
1999–00	UEFA Cup	Qualifying round	(Iceland) KR Reykjavík	2–0	0–1	2–1
1999–00	UEFA Cup	First round	(Germany) Kaiserslautern	0–2	0–3	0–5
2001–02	UEFA Cup	Qualifying round	(Northern Ireland) Glenavon	1–0	1–0	2–0
2001–02	UEFA Cup	First round	(Norway) Viking	1–1	0–2	1–3
2019–20	UEFA Europa League	First qualifying round	(Wales) Connah's Quay Nomads	0–2	2–1	2–3
2024–25	UEFA Europa League	Second qualifying round	(Belgium) Cercle Brugge	1–1	0–1	1–2
2024–25	UEFA Conference League	Third qualifying round	(Norway) Tromsø	2–2	1–0	3–2
2024–25	UEFA Conference League	Play-off round	(Denmark) Copenhagen	1–1	0–2	1–3

== Hall of Fame ==
=== 2014 inductees ===
- The Founding Fathers – founders of Kilmarnock Football Club
- Kilmarnock FC 1964–65 squad
- Hugh Allen M.B.E. – club physiotherapist 1968–2002
- Willie Culley – all-time record goalscorer
- Alan Robertson – most Scottish league appearances
- Mattha Smith – Scottish Cup winner 1920 & 1929

=== 2016 inductees ===
- James Fowler – captain 2012 League Cup winners
- Stuart McLean – 2nd highest league appearances
- Tommy McLean – golden era award
- Ray Montgomerie – captain 1997 Scottish Cup winners
- Eddie Morrison – highest post-war goalscorer
- Manuel Pascali – 1st international award

=== 2018 inductees ===
- Frank Beattie – Golden era award
- Paul Clarke –legends award
- Frédéric Dindeleux – international award
- Ronnie Hamilton – legends award
- Garry Hay – legends award
- Derrick McDicken – legends award
- Willie Waddell – manager 1964–65 league championship winners
- Bobby Williamson – manager 1997 Scottish Cup winners

=== 2022 inductees ===
- Kenny Shiels – manager 2012 Scottish League Cup final
- Alan McCulloch – former goalkeeper
- Kris Boyd – scored 121 league goals

=== 2023 inductees ===
- Ally Mitchell – 1997 Scottish Cup winner
- George Maxwell – champion hot–shot trophy winner

=== 2024 inductees ===
- Tommy Burns – former player / manager
- Gus MacPherson – 1997 Scottish Cup winner
- Mark Reilly – 1997 Scottish Cup winner

=== 2025 inductees ===
- Ross Mathie – former player
- Walter McCrae – former player / club secretary
- Paul Wright – 1997 Scottish Cup winner

=== 2026 inductees ===
- Davie Sneddon – 1964–65 league winner
- Brien McIlroy – 1964–65 league winner, Kilmarnock's third highest goalscorer
- Jim Clark – former assistant manager and coach

=== Notable academy graduates ===
- Jamie Adams
- Scott Anson
- Lee Ashcroft
- Ross Barbour
- Cammy Bell
- Kris Boyd
- Conor Brennan
- Tomas Brindley
- Innes Cameron
- Robert Campbell
- Peter Canero
- Mark Canning
- Kyle Connell
- David Cox
- Ross Davidson
- Euan Deveney
- Justin Devenny
- Paul Di Giacomo
- Shaun Dillon
- Michael Doyle
- Gary Fisher
- Iain Flannigan
- James Fowler
- Adam Frizzell
- William Gros
- Jamie Hamill
- Dean Hawkshaw
- Garry Hay
- Emilio Jaconelli
- Chris Johnston
- Matty Kennedy
- Greg Kiltie
- Jim Lauchlan
- Rory Loy
- Devlin MacKay
- Gary McCutcheon
- Gary McDonald
- Neil McGregor
- Barrie McKay
- Daniel McKay
- Rory McKenzie
- Scott McLean
- Lewis Morrison
- Robbie Muirhead
- Scott Murray
- Steven Naismith
- Mark O'Hara
- Alex Pursehouse
- Craig Samson
- Craig Slater
- Graeme Smith
- Aaron Splaine
- Colin Stewart
- David Syme
- Ally Taylor
- Greg Taylor
- Bobby Wales
- David Watson
- Iain Wilson
- Jude Winchester

== See also ==
- Kilmarnock FC Women
- Howard Park, Kilmarnock
- Killie pie
