= Stephan Palla =

Footballer (born 1989)

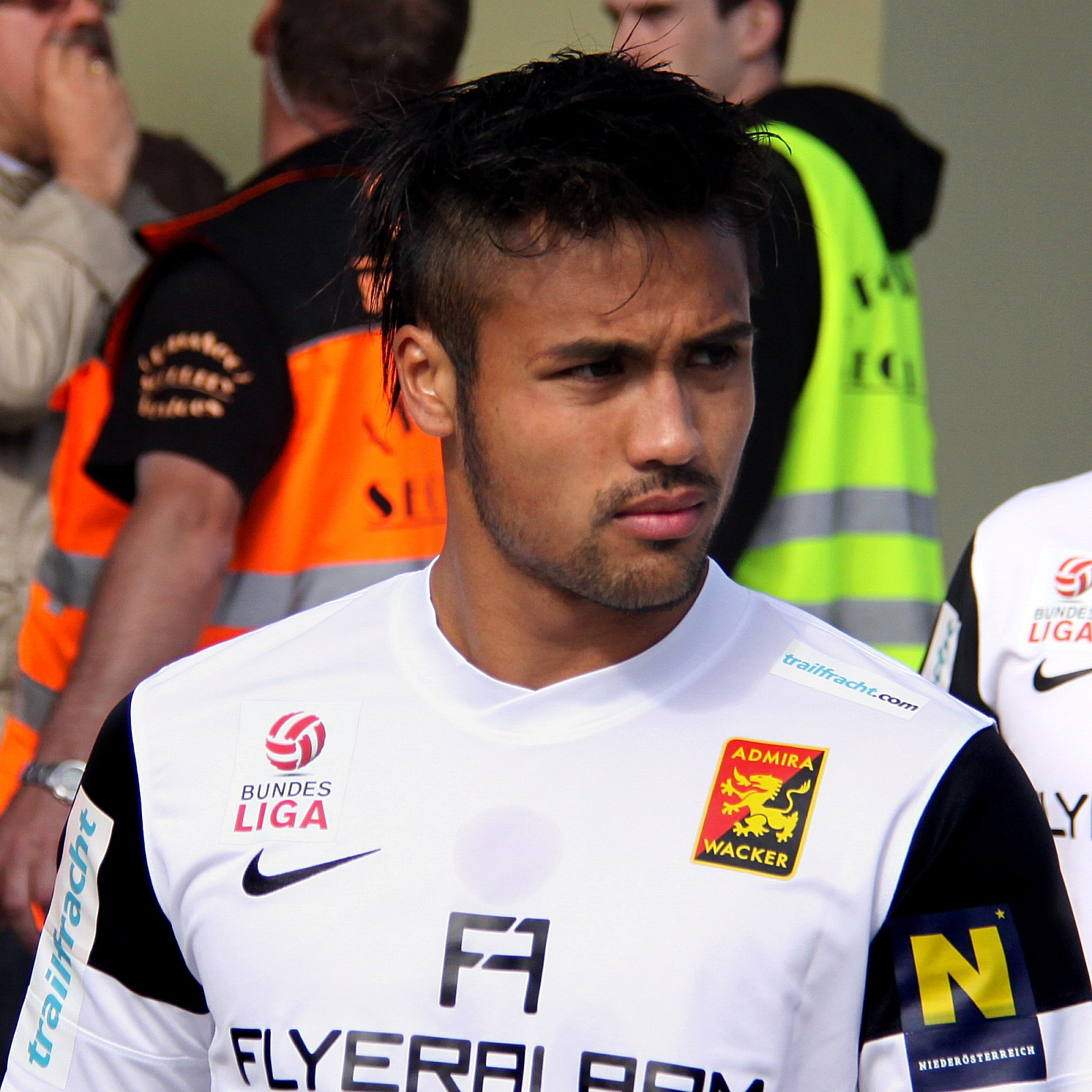
- Palla playing for Admira in 2013

Personal information
- Full name: Stephan Maceda Palla
- Date of birth: 15 May 1989 (age 37)
- Place of birth: Mauerbach, Austria
- Height: 1.72 m (5 ft 8 in)
- Positions: Left-back; centre-back

Team information
- Current team: ASK Voitsberg
- Number: 40

Youth career
- –1998: Mauerbach
- 1998–2007: Rapid Wien

Senior career*
| Years | Team | Apps | (Gls) |
| 2007–2009 | Rapid Wien II | 44 | (0) |
| 2008–2014 | Rapid Wien | 10 | (0) |
| 2009 | → Lustenau 07 (loan) | 12 | (0) |
| 2010 | → DAC Dunajská Streda (loan) | 14 | (0) |
| 2010–2013 | → Admira Wacker (loan) | 77 | (1) |
| 2014–2018 | Wolfsberg | 92 | (0) |
| 2018 | St. Pölten | 0 | (0) |
| 2019 | Buriram United | 11 | (0) |
| 2020–2022 | Grazer AK | 35 | (0) |
| 2023– | ASK Voitsberg | 24 | (1) |

International career^{‡}
| 2005–2006 | Austria U17 | 11 | (0) |
| 2006–2007 | Austria U18 | 12 | (0) |
| 2007 | Austria U19 | 10 | (0) |
| 2015–2019 | Philippines | 14 | (0) |
- * Club domestic league appearances and goals as of 05:43, 21 April 2024 (UTC) ‡ National team caps and goals as of 13:49, 7 June 2019 (UTC)

Stephan Maceda Palla (born 15 May 1989) is a professional footballer who plays as a defender for Austrian Regionalliga Central club ASK Voitsberg.

Born in Austria, Palla spent his youth and early career with Rapid Wien before joining Wolfsberg. He then spent a season in Thailand with Buriram United before returning to Austria.

At international level, he represented the youth teams of his birth country before switching to the Philippines, for whom he is eligible through his mother. He made his senior international debut in 2015.

== Club career ==
=== Rapid Vienna ===
Palla began his career with SC Mauerbach and joined in the year 1998 to the academy from SK Rapid Wien. In the season 2007/2008 trained with the first team from Rapid Vienna and gave his debut on 29 March 2008 against Wacker Innsbruck. In summer 2008 was announced he will play on loan by FC Lustenau, he was not contract with the cooperations club and joined to the reserve team from Rapid Wien in January 2009. On 15 January 2010 left SK Rapid Wien and signed for Slovak club DAC Dunajská Streda.

=== Wolfsberg ===
In mid-May 2014, Palla moved to Wolfsberg, signing a two-year contract.

=== St. Pölten ===
In July 2018, Palla joined St. Pölten, signing a one-year contract with an option to extend.

=== Buriram United ===
In July 2019, Palla moved to Buriram United.

== International career ==
Palla was born in Austria to a Hungarian father and a Filipino mother, Palla initially represented Austria and played over 20 games for the U-17 national team. In June 2013, German coach Michael Weiß has referred to Palla as an "interesting option" for the Philippines national team's defense. On 25 May 2015, Palla has received his first senior call for Philippines to compete at the 2018 FIFA World Cup qualifiers. He made his debut for the Philippines in a 2–1 victory against Bahrain.

== Honours ==
Rapid Wien

- Austrian Bundesliga: 2007–08

FC Trenkwalder Admira

- Austrian Football First League: 2010–11

Buriram United

- Thailand Champions Cup: 2019
