= Jack Unterweger =

Austrian serial killer (1950–1994)

- Born: Johann Unterweger; 16 August 1950; Judenburg, Styria, Allied-occupied Austria
- Died: 29 June 1994 (aged 43); Graz-Karlau Prison, Graz, Styria, Austria
- Cause of death: Suicide by hanging
- Occupations: Journalist, playwright, waiter
- Convictions: Murder ×1 (1976); Murder ×9 (1994)
- Penalty: Life imprisonment

Details
- Victims: 12–15
- Span of crimes: 1974–1992
- Country: Austria, West Germany, Czechoslovakia, United States
- Date apprehended: 17 January 1975 (first arrest); 27 February 1992 (second arrest)

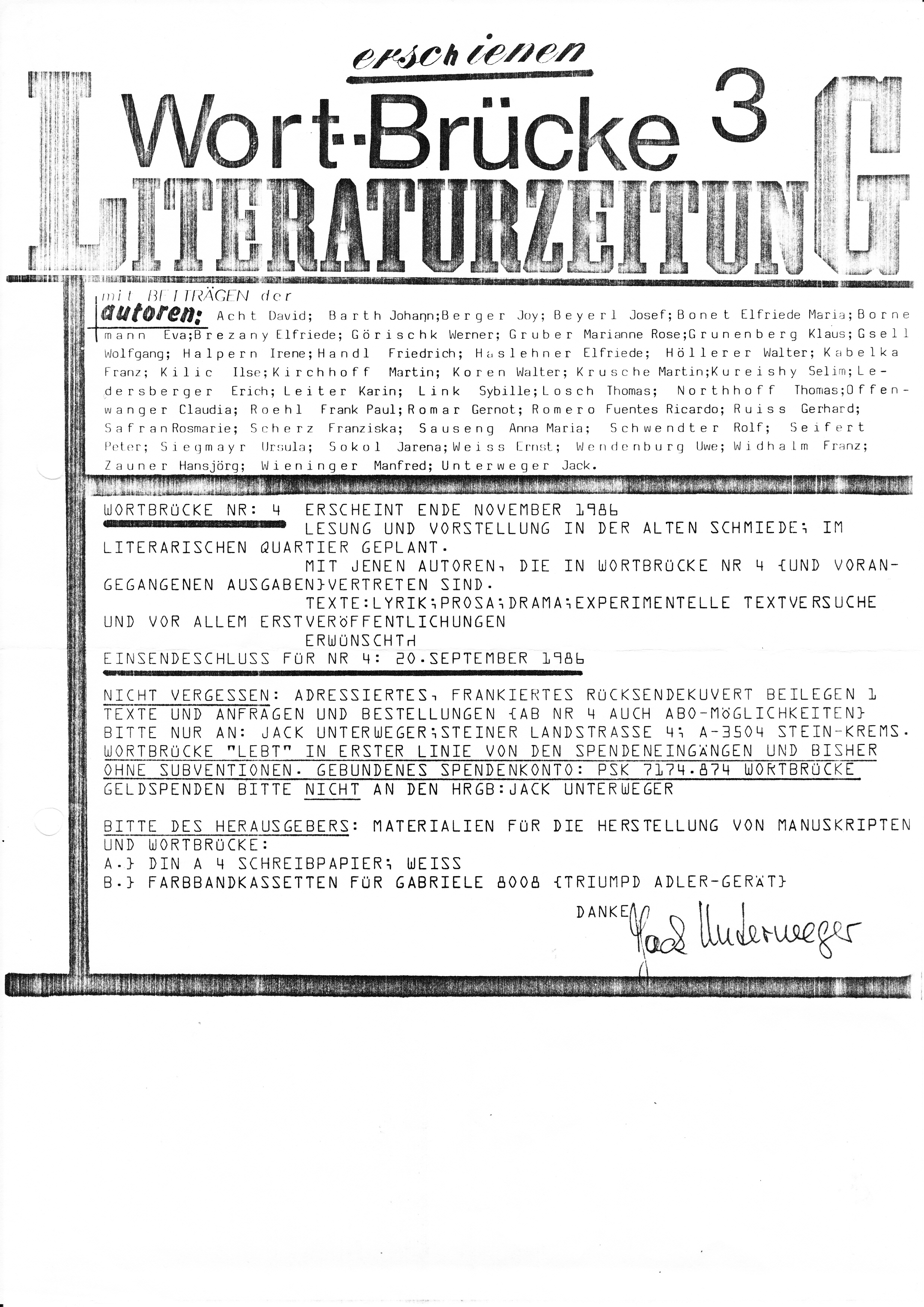
A leaflet written by Jack Unterweger while in prison in 1986, advertising third issue of literature magazine Wortbrücke edited by himself, calling for papers for the fourth issue, and asking for financial and material support

Johann "Jack" Unterweger (16 August 1950 – 29 June 1994) was an Austrian serial killer who committed at least twelve murders in Austria, West Germany, Czechoslovakia and the United States.

Initially convicted in 1976 of a single murder, Unterweger began to write extensively while in prison. His work gained the attention of Austrian intellectuals, who interpreted it as evidence of his supposed rehabilitation. After significant lobbying, Unterweger was released on parole in 1990. Upon his release, he became a minor celebrity and worked as a playwright and journalist, but within months he resumed his killing spree. Unterweger hanged himself in prison after being convicted of nine more murders in June 1994.

== Early life ==
Unterweger was born in Judenburg, Styria, in Austria, to Theresia Unterweger, a barmaid and waitress from Klagenfurt. Theresia was a petty criminal who was jailed several times at Justizanstalt Klagenfurt for fraud, trespassing, theft, forgery and embezzlement, having received early release due to her pregnancy. Theresia had been on her way to Graz by car when she went into labour. Unterweger claimed in interviews and his autobiography that his mother was occasionally engaged in prostitution, but Austrian judicial records do not list any convictions or arrests for prostitution. His mother stated that Unterweger invented the allegation to slander her and "make his book sell better".

The father's identity was not given in the birth record. Theresia claimed that Unterweger's father was Jack Becker, a U.S. Army soldier from New Jersey whom she had met in 1949 during his station in Trieste, later listing "Jack Bäcker" as her son's father in legal guardianship papers. His mother chose the nickname "Jack" for her son this way, but he was more frequently called "Hansi" during his childhood.

In January 1951, less than a year after Unterweger's birth, Theresia was imprisoned in Salzburg for a previous fraud conviction, leading to her son being given into the care of a foster mother in Plainfeld for a year. In February 1952, Unterweger was put into custody of his grandfather, Ferdinand Wieser, and his life partner Maria Springer, with whom he was to remain until the age of eight. Unterweger described Wieser as a philandering alcoholic and reputed "rough fellow" who regularly used his grandson to help him steal farm animals. Unterweger also alleged that his grandfather often brought home female strangers and forced Unterweger to watch the pair have sex. Government records, neighbours, and relatives, including Springer's two adult children who lived with the couple in the beginning, contradicted this characterization, saying that Unterweger was cared for and that neither Wieser or Springer drank excessively. Similarly, it was pointed out that Wieser did not go out regularly due to poor health, suffering from a partial facial paralysis, near-blindness and deafness of the left ear, as well as emphysema and bronchitis. The family lived in a wooden lodge in the Ortschaft Pisweg, Carinthia. Springer claimed that Unterweger had a tendency to misuse Wieser's trust and had pit Wieser against Springer by "tattletaling" on her.

In March 1953, Theresia married American soldier Donald van Blarcom. The same year, she began paying monthly child support of 100 schilling. Unterweger stated that after seeing a picture of his new stepfather, he began doubting his mother's initial claim and that he believed van Blarcom was also his biological father due to their physical resemblance.

In June 1958, Springer broke up with Wieser and as he was too infirm to care for his grandson alone, Unterweger's great-aunt Juliana Wieser briefly became his legal guardian, living with her in nearby Straßburg for a few months. During this time, Unterweger claimed that he witnessed his best friend Klaus get run over by a road roller. The local gendarmerie confirmed that a similar incident had occurred in the same timeframe, when a six-year-old boy named Helmut Salzer was fatally crushed under the wheel of an excavator, but according to Unterweger's cousin Martha Lupar, he did not know Salzer, nor was he present during the boy's death. In April 1959, Unterweger was again taken into foster care and put into the custody of the Drofenik family in Liebenfels. Between 1962 and 1965, Unterweger was brought up in an Evangelical reform school in Treffen. He dropped out of school in 1965 and took an apprenticeship as an assistant hotel waiter in St. Veit an der Glan, a position he held for six months before being fired. His probation officer was informed by a youth welfare employee that Unterweger was dangerous and known to harass girls at his former school. Throughout 1966, Unterweger entered several other hotel waiter apprenticeships in St. Anton, Mondsee, and Bad Hofgastein, but left each one after a few months.

Unterweger's first conviction was in November 1966, after he stole a total of 527 schilling from two hotel guests at work. He was sentenced to three days jail with a subsequent 13-month stay at the Bundesanstalt für Erziehungsbedürftige Kaiserebersdorf, a federal juvenile detention facility, in Vienna's Kaiserebersdorf quarter for rehabilitation. After his release in December 1967, Unterweger continued to work as a waiter at various hotels, often being dismissed for workplace theft. Unterweger claimed that he joined a boxing club in St. Veit, where he supposedly had a 6-0 match record before being ousted after being falsely accused of stealing funds. Carinthia boxing federation president Karl Blaha and St. Veit Box Club chairman Willibald Piketz denied Unterweger's claims, saying he was never a member and that there was no record of either his fights or a theft linked to him. When Unterweger turned 18, the regional court sent a letter to his mother, informing her that they would not provide further social services to Unterweger as "educational measures are unlikely to be successful". From this point on, Unterweger drifted through Austria and worked occasional labour jobs.

== First offences ==
Between 1966 and 1974, Unterweger was convicted sixteen times. His offences were mostly for theft and burglary, but throughout the early 1970s, the crimes also included pimping and sexual assault, as well as several counts of physical assault.

Between 1968 and 1969, Unterweger served two sentences for theft, totalling ten months. In summer 1969, he was sentenced to four months imprisonment for burglary at a kiosk. In 1970, Unterweger was sentenced to seven months imprisonment for the kidnapping a minor from her legal guardians and theft, with the sentence extended by three months after he sent a threatening letter to a woman from prison.

On 13 May 1971, in Salzburg, Unterweger lured sex worker Monika H. into his car, then drove her to the moors outside of the city. Inside the vehicle, Unterweger hit H. in the back of the head with a metal rod, stripped her naked, tied her up with underwear and sodomized her with the rod while masturbating. H. alerted passersby of the rape after which Unterweger was arrested. While jailed, Unterweger attempted suicide by overdosing on sleeping pills, for which he was transferred to a psychiatric unit and released without returning to police custody. Later sources claim that the rape occurred in 1974 and that the victim was a teenage student named Daphne. In August 1971, Unterweger crossed into West Germany, but was detained for three weeks in October of the same year and deported back to Austria, where he spent fifteen months imprisoned for multiple counts of vehicle theft.

On 1 April 1973, 23-year-old Yugoslavian national Marica Horvath was found murdered in a lake of the Salzach near Salzburg. She had been bound and gagged with pantyhose and a distinct necktie. The same month, Unterweger was arrested on suspicion of the murder, as the tie had been bought in Wels, where he lived at the time. There was no physical evidence against him, however, and his underage girlfriend at the time gave a false alibi, due to which the investigation was dropped. August Schenner, the lead officer in the homicide case, noted that Horvath's murder bore striking similarities to Unterweger's modus operandi. Schenner would unsuccessfully attempt to reopen the case to convict Unterweger of another murder in 1983 and kept in touch with Vienna's police department during their investigation into Unterweger during his serial murders in 1992.

On 22 October 1973, Unterweger picked nurse Maria W. as a hitchhiker in Kitzbühel. Unterweger drove to Oberndorf, claiming he had to run an errand there and when the two were headed back to the main road, Unterweger abruptly braked the vehicle and began punching Maria W. while attempting to rape her. W. broke free of his grasp and fled into the woods while screaming for help. After another physical struggle, Unterweger relented and agreed to drive her to her parents back in Kitzbühel, convincing her to not press charges on the way over. W. relayed the actual sequence of events while being treated at her hospital in St. Johann and alerted the authorities on 20 November 1973. During police interrogation, Unterweger admitted to beating W., but claimed that he had undressed her in preparation for consensual sex and that most of her and his own injuries were the result of a car crash.

Shortly after again being convicted of theft in March 1974, Unterweger entered an abusive two-week relationship with Elisabeth L. in Rohrbach. He beat and sexually assaulted L., keeping her from speaking out under threat of abducting her child and cutting the child's face with razor blades. In July 1974, Unterweger physically assaulted two women, with one victim losing an incisor. The same month, Unterweger met Anneliese E. and moved to Switzerland with her, working as a disc jockey and waiter. There, the couple met West German national Barbara Scholz, who also became Unterweger's girlfriend, but shortly after Scholz was deported back to Germany, Unterweger and Anneliese E. followed suit in November 1974. Scholz and E. were both underage and financed Unterweger's lifestyle through prostitution alongside other teenaged girls.

=== First murder conviction ===
On the evening of 11 December 1974, Unterweger and Scholz burgled the home of Scholz's parents in Ewersbach, when 18-year-old Margret Schäfer, a friend of Scholz, caught them in the act. They convinced Schäfer to keep quiet and accompany them in the car. After Scholz stole the equivalent of 100 schilling from an acquaintance's apartment, the group reached a parking lot, where Unterweger overpowered Schäfer, tied her up and stole her wallet, promising to release her outside of town. Unterweger stopped at the forest near Herborn and leaving Scholz in the car, Unterweger marched Schäfer into the treeline. Unterweger beat her several times with an iron bar, tied her up with her pantyhose, raped her with the weapon and manually strangled Schäfer to death. After covering the body with dirt and leaves, Unterweger tied Schäfer's bra around her neck post-mortem to frame the killing as solely sexually motivated.

In early January 1975, Unterweger, Scholz and Annelise E. committed a robbery at a jewellery store in Ewersbach and fled back to Switzerland. Running short on money, Unterweger called the parents of Anneliese E. and demanded ransom in exchange for her return. A handover was arranged at a bank in Basel on 17 January, where Unterweger was instead met by police, who arrested him for kidnapping of a minor. After spending two months in a Zürich jail, Unterweger was handed to Austrian authorities. He was transferred between prisons in Vorarlberg, Garsten and Stein an der Donau, and in July 1975, Unterweger was convicted of four counts of rape and assault committed between 1971 and 1974, receiving three years imprisonment. Germany allowed Austria to handle Unterweger's trial for the murder of Margret Schäfer and on 1 June 1976, Unterweger was sentenced to life in prison. Barbara Scholz was also tried as an accomplice and received eight years imprisonment. A standing investigation against Unterweger for the murder of Marica Horvath also ceased with the conviction.

While incarcerated he wrote short stories, poems, plays and an autobiography, "Fegefeuer oder die Reise ins Zuchthaus" ("Purgatory or The Journey to Prison"), that later served as the basis for a 1988 film adaptation, becoming known as a "Häfenliterat", Austrian German vernacular for "jail writer", usually translated as "Jack the Writer" as a play on Jack the Ripper). Several figures, including Austrian writer Elfriede Jelinek, have since questioned whether Unterweger actually wrote Purgatory. Unterweger had plagiarized at least some of his works, largely children's stories, from Sonja von Eisenstein, a journalist who had kept correspondence with him during his imprisonment, and sent her several poems by Hermann Hesse, claiming them as his own with minimal alterations. It's generally believed that the vast majority of his literature was rewritten from pre-existing works. Most of his stage plays dealt with class conflict and were autobiographical, though with the focus on his non-violent offences. The murder of Margret Schäfer is left out entirely, being replaced by a fictitious event in which Unterweger's character beats and urinates on a wealthy man who had solicited him for sex.

Unterweger lied to von Eisenstein about the details of his murder conviction, saying he had killed Schäfer while experiencing a drug-induced blackout in which he hallucinated her as his mother, leaving out the preceding robbery and rape. He repeated a defence he had made during his trial, claiming that his criminal ways were the result of a traumatic childhood. He also invented a fictional "Aunt Anna", who was a supposed prostitute and murdered by a client in 1967. In reality, then 16-year-old Unterweger had read a newspaper article about the murder of an unrelated Anna Unterweger, really a kitchen helper who had been raped and killed by a homeless ex-convict in Salzburg. For years, he falsely claimed that her murder subconsciously contributed to his own mistreatment and later murders of women, and that the headline for the news article was "Her last customer was her murderer" rather than the actual, "Violent vagabond incriminated", believing that anyone who attempted to verify the story would not investigate for further details.

==== Pardon campaign and release ====
In 1985, a campaign to pardon and release Unterweger from prison commenced. Austrian President Rudolf Kirchschläger (SPÖ/ÖVP) refused the petition when it was presented to him, citing the court-mandated minimum of fifteen years' imprisonment. Writers, artists, journalists and politicians agitated for a pardon, including Jelinek and German novelist Günter Grass, along with the editor of Manuskripte magazine, Alfred Kolleritsch.

Unterweger was released on 23 May 1990, after the required minimum fifteen years of his sentence. Upon his release, Purgatory was taught in Austrian schools and his stories for children were performed on Austrian radio. Unterweger himself hosted television programmes which discussed criminal rehabilitation and worked as a journalist for the public broadcaster ORF, where he reported on stories concerning the very murders for which he was later found guilty. His attempts at playwriting outside of prison were critically panned. Wilhelm Hengstler, who directed the film adaptation of Unterweger's book, described Unterweger as having no interest in literature besides his own, commenting "Jack only loved Jack".

== Serial killings ==
=== Czechoslovakia ===
On 14 September 1990, less than three months following his release, Unterweger met 20-year-old butcher shop employee Blanka Bočková while in Prague. Bočková had an argument with her husband Zdeněk before the encounter, after which she was last seen by her acquaintance Martin Moijzis, walking towards Wenceslas Square with a well-dressed middle-aged man. Bočková's body was found the next morning near the Vltava River, 15 kilometres (9.3 mi) south of Prague, with signs of both manual and ligature strangulation.

=== Austria ===
Between October 1990 and May 1991, Unterweger killed at least seven women in Austria. The victims were sex workers, two of whom were unregistered, with several of them having been previously solicited by Unterweger. The women were driven outside of town, beaten, raped, and left in forested areas. All were manually strangled, which was the cause of death for most, while some were asphyxiated with underwear such as bras, pantyhoses or stockings.

- 27 October 1990, Graz: 41-year-old Brunhilde Masser. Found on 26 January 1991 in Gratkorn.
- 5 December 1990, Bregenz: 31-year-old Heidemarie "Heide" Hammerer. Found on 31 December 1990 in Lustenau.
- 7 March 1991, Graz: 35-year-old Elfriede Schrempf. Found on 5 October 1991 in Lichendorf.
- 8 April 1991, Vienna: 23-year-old Silvia Zagler. Found on 4 August 1991 in Wolfsgraben.
- 16 April 1991, Vienna: 25-year-old Sabine Moitzi. Found on 20 May 1991 in near Schottenhof Penzing.
- 28 April 1991, Vienna: 33-year-old Regina Prem. Found on 16 April 1992 in Döbling district, on Hermannskogel.
- 8 May 1991, Vienna: 25-year-old Karin Eroglu-Sladky. Found on 23 May 1991 in Gablitz.

During the same timeframe, Unterweger maintained several relationships, including with journalists, lawyers, prostitutes, and teenage students. For much of this time, he lived with Margit Haas, a wealthy journalist for the magazine Wiener. Rudolf Prem, the husband of Regina Prem, had made extensive efforts to locate his wife and offered 10,000 schillings as a reward. For several months, from May to October 1991, Rudolf was taunted over the phone by several prank callers, including Unterweger. On 5 June 1991, Unterweger was the leading reporter in an ORF broadcast about the killing of sex workers in Vienna, interviewing colleagues of the murdered women. He also wrote an article for a monthly magazine about the red light district of Graz, without mentioning the murders of Brunhilde Masser and Elfriede Schrempf the prior year.

=== United States ===
In summer 1991, Unterweger was hired by an Austrian magazine to write about crime in Los Angeles and the differences between U.S. and European attitudes to prostitution. He met local police, even going so far as to participate in a ride-along in the city's red light districts. During time in Los Angeles and Malibu, Unterweger beat, raped, and murdered three sex workers: 35-year-old Shannon Exley on 20 June, 33-year-old Irene Rodriguez on 28 June, and 26-year-old Peggi Jean Booth (also known as Sherri Ann Long) on 3 July. The killings were linked by the distinct way the bras of the victims were cut and tied into a granny knot to be more suitable for controlled asphyxiation.

Back in Austria, Unterweger was suggested as a suspect for the sex worker murders. In the absence of other suspects, police took a serious look at Unterweger and kept him under surveillance until he went to the U.S., ostensibly as a reporter; the police observed nothing to connect him with the killings. Through autumn 1991, Unterweger was questioned twice by Vienna Police Councillor Max Edelbacher. On 8 October 1991, Unterweger called Rudolf Prem again and falsely named Tulbinger Kogel as the site where he had left Regina, also referencing a total of eleven victims. Following Unterweger's arrest, Prem handed police his wife's diary containing descriptions of previous meetings with Unterweger, which supported his continued penchant for bondage and physical violence during sex.

=== Arrest and death ===
Police in Graz eventually gathered enough evidence to arrest Unterweger, but he had fled by the time they entered his home. After law enforcement agencies chased him and his girlfriend, 18-year-old Bianca Mrak, through Switzerland, France, and the US, he was finally arrested by US Marshals in Miami, Florida, on 27 February 1992. While a fugitive, he had called ORF to try to convince them of his innocence. The broadcaster was noted to maintain a sympathetic coverage of Unterweger, continuing to describe details of Unterweger's fabricated biography, including that he was only a "killer of prostitutes" and that his motivations were rooted in childhood trauma rather than for sexual gratification. Tabloid newspapers, particularly Bild, additionally referred to him by the ephitet "the Murder Poet".

Unterweger was extradited back to Austria on 27 May 1992 and charged with eleven murders. Two of his girlfriends, Margrit Haas and lawyer Astrid Wagner, were vocal about their support of Unterweger, based on the perception he was innocent, until they read the original court transcript for the murder of Margrit Schäfer. The jury found him guilty of nine murders by a 6:2 majority, sufficient for a conviction under Austrian law. Based on a psychiatric examination, Austrian psychiatrist Dr. Reinhard Haller diagnosed Unterweger with narcissistic personality disorder and presented his findings to the court on 20 June 1994. On 29 June, Unterweger was sentenced to life in prison without possibility of parole.

That night, Unterweger killed himself at Justizanstalt Graz-Jakomini by hanging himself with a rope made from shoelaces and a cord from the trousers of a tracksuit, using the same knot that was found on all the strangled sex workers.

Prior to his death, Unterweger had asserted his intention to seek an appeal, and therefore, under Austrian law, his guilty verdict was not considered legally binding after his death, as it has not been reviewed and confirmed by the court.

== See also ==
- Jack Henry Abbott
- Edward Edwards
- Edgar Smith
- List of serial killers by country
- List of serial killers by number of victims
