= Pressbaum =

- Municipality
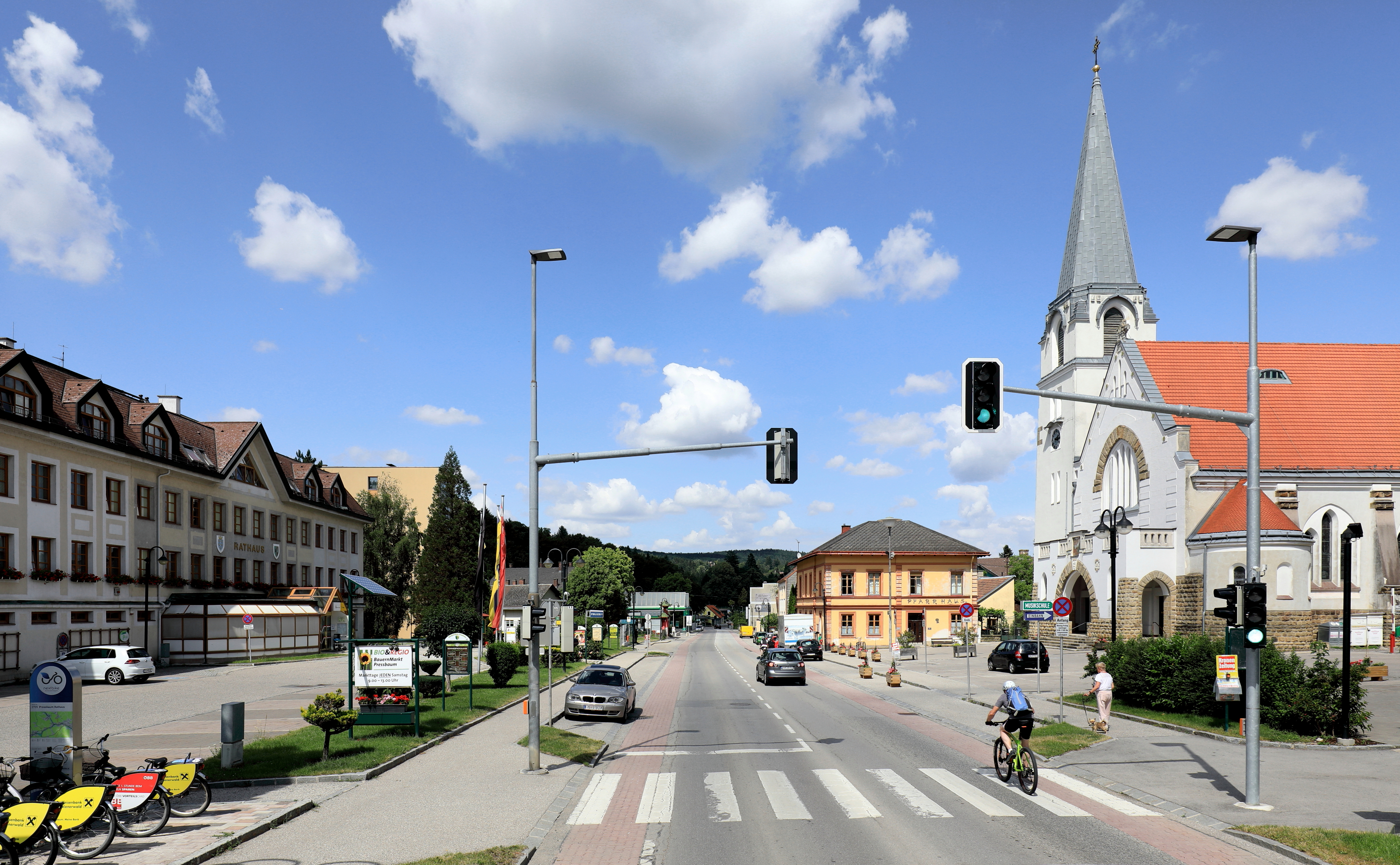

- Coat of arms

- Location within Lower Austria Location within Austria
- Coordinates: 48°11′00″N 16°04′57″E
- Country: Austria
- State: Lower Austria
- District: Sankt Pölten-Land

Government
  - Mayor: Josef Schmidl-Haberleitner (ÖVP)

Area
  - Total: 58.87 km^{2} (22.73 sq mi)
- Elevation: 315 m (1,033 ft)

Population (2018-01-01)
  - Total: 7,559
  - Density: 128.4/km^{2} (332.6/sq mi)
- Time zone: UTC+1 (CET)
  - Summer (DST): UTC+2 (CEST)
- Postal code: 3021
- Area code: 02233
- Vehicle registration: PL
- Website: www.pressbaum.net

Pressbaum is a town in the district of St. Pölten-Land in the Austrian state of Lower Austria.

In 1881, Johannes Brahms completed his Second Piano Concerto while in the town.

It belonged to Wien-Umgebung District which was dissolved at the end of 2016.

== Population ==
Historical population
Year	Pop.	±%
1971	4,264	—
1981	4,899	+14.9%
1991	5,421	+10.7%
2001	5,834	+7.6%

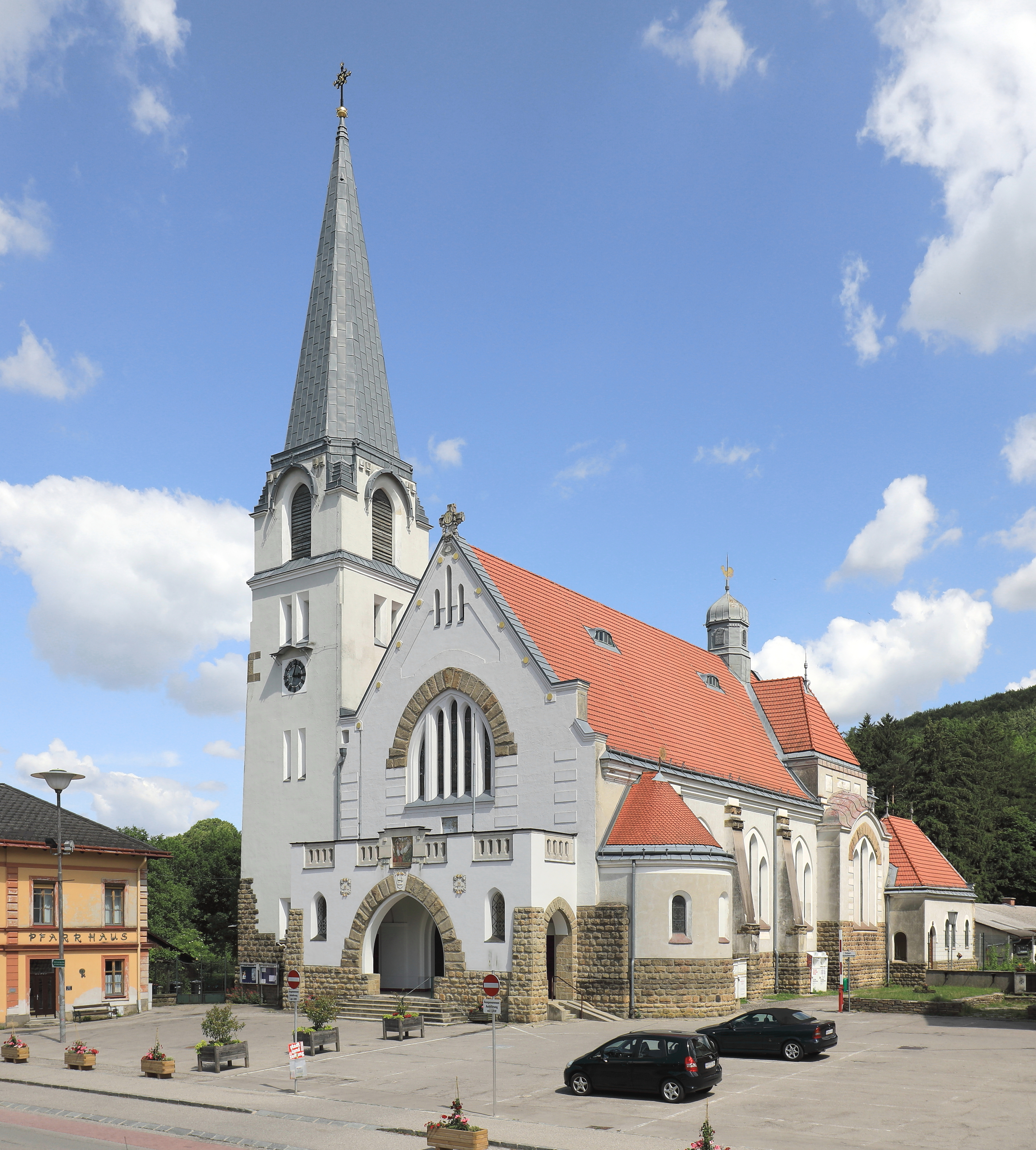
Parish church

== Transport ==
Pressbaum is located on the Westbahn, on which REX51 and SS50 pass from Wien Westbahnhof to Sankt Poelten / Neulengbach.

Pressbaum is located in the area of the transpprt association Verkehrsverbund Ost-Region (VOR).
