= Stefan Maierhofer =

Austrian footballer and manager (born 1982)

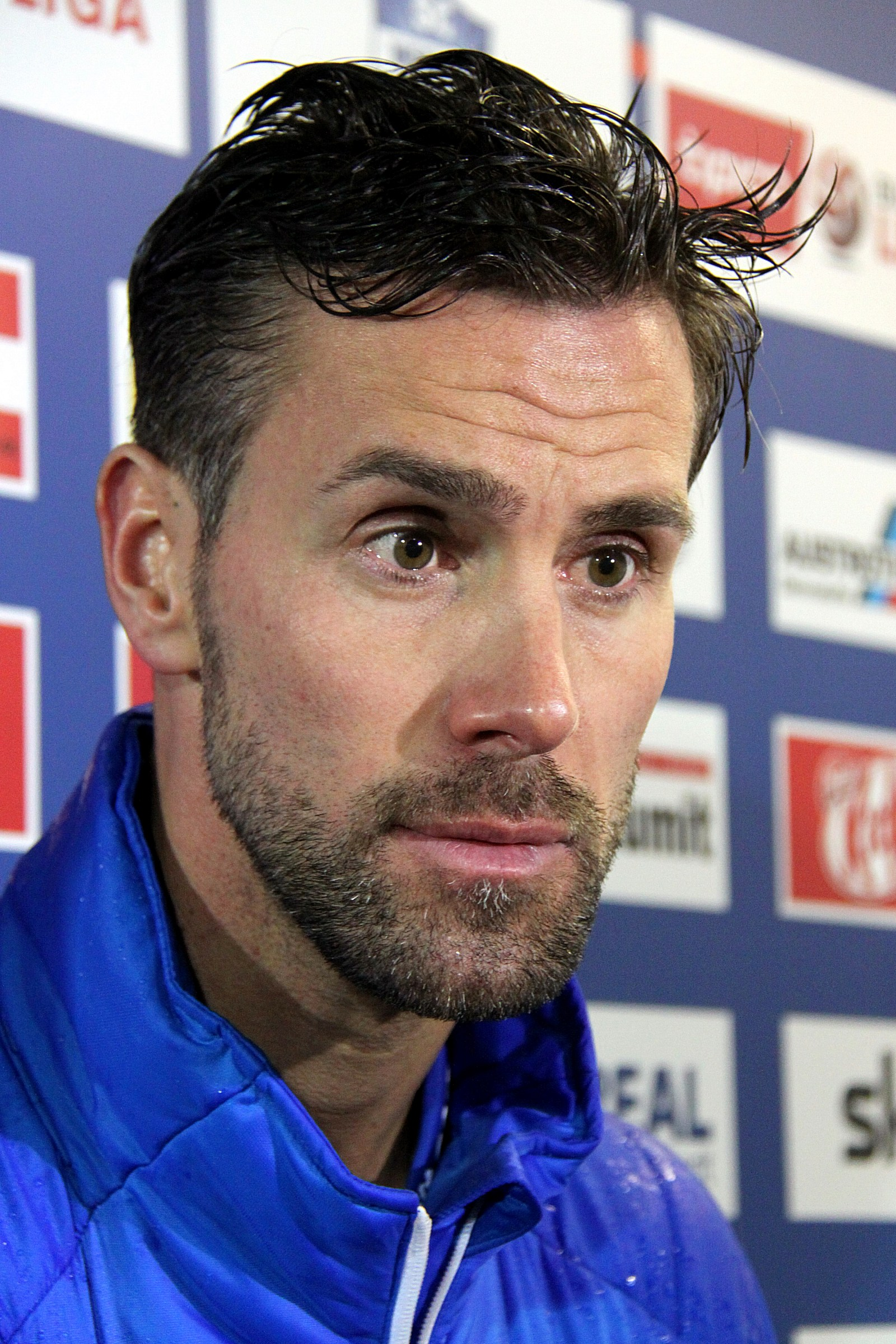
- Maierhofer in 2014

Personal information
- Date of birth: 16 August 1982 (age 44)
- Place of birth: Gablitz, Austria
- Height: 2.02 m (6 ft 8 in)
- Position: Striker

Team information
- Current team: Kremser SC (head coach)

Youth career
- 1990–1991: SC Mauerbach
- 1991–1996: SV Gablitz
- 1996–1999: FC Tulln
- 1999–2001: SV Gablitz

Senior career*
Years	Team	Apps	(Gls)
2002–2003	First Vienna	18	(2)
2003–2005	SV Langenrohr	39	(20)
2005–2007	Bayern Munich II	42	(21)
2006	Bayern Munich	2	(0)
2007	TuS Koblenz	14	(3)
2007–2008	Greuther Fürth	10	(2)
2008	→ Rapid Wien (loan)	11	(7)
2008–2009	Rapid Wien	38	(24)
2009–2011	Wolverhampton Wanderers	9	(1)
2010	→ Bristol City (loan)	3	(0)
2010–2011	→ MSV Duisburg (loan)	27	(8)
2011–2013	Red Bull Salzburg	39	(15)
2013	1. FC Köln	14	(1)
2014	Millwall	11	(2)
2014–2015	SC Wiener Neustadt	4	(1)
2015	Millwall	10	(1)
2016	AS Trenčín	10	(2)
2017–2018	SV Mattersburg	37	(7)
2018–2020	FC Aarau	40	(13)
2020	WSG Swarovski Tirol	13	(2)
2020	Admira Wacker	7	(0)
2021	Würzburger Kickers	7	(0)
2022–2023	Kremser SC	20	(1)
Total		425	(133)

International career
2008–2011	Austria	19	(1)

Managerial career
- 2026–: Kremser SC
- * Club domestic league appearances and goals

Stefan Maierhofer
No. 39
- Position: Placekicker

Personal information
- Born: 16 August 1982 (age 44); Gablitz, Austria
- Listed weight: 216 lb (98 kg)

Career history
- Vienna Vikings (2025)

Stefan Maierhofer (born 16 August 1982) is an Austrian football manager and former player who is head coach of Regionalliga East club Kremser SC. He played as a striker and is known in Austrian football by the nickname the Major (German: Der Major).

Maierhofer was working as a cook in his parents' inn and playing fourth-tier football for SV Langenrohr when he arranged his own trial at Bayern Munich in 2005. He became captain of the reserve side and made two Bundesliga appearances before spells with the 2. Bundesliga clubs TuS Koblenz and Greuther Fürth. A loan move to Rapid Wien in January 2008 transformed his career. He scored seven goals in eleven league matches as Rapid won the title, and the following season he struck 27 times in all competitions. That form took him to Premier League club Wolverhampton Wanderers in 2009, although he made only nine league appearances in two years and spent loan spells at Bristol City and MSV Duisburg.

He returned to Austria with Red Bull Salzburg in 2011 and won the league and cup double in his first season, finishing as joint top scorer in the Austrian Bundesliga alongside Jakob Jantscher. Eleven further clubs followed in five countries, among them 1. FC Köln, Millwall, AS Trenčín, SV Mattersburg, FC Aarau and Würzburger Kickers. Maierhofer retired in 2023 after a season as player-coach at Kremser SC. Between 2008 and 2011 he made 19 appearances for Austria, scoring once.

Maierhofer returned to professional sport in 2025 as a placekicker for the Vienna Vikings in the European League of Football, reaching the championship game in his only season. He completed the UEFA Pro Licence while coaching at the Burgenland academy and was appointed head coach of Kremser SC in July 2026.

== Early life and early career ==
Maierhofer was born on 16 August 1982 in Gablitz in Lower Austria. His parents took over the Hochram-Alpe inn in the town, and he began playing for the local club SV Gablitz at the age of eight. He trained as a cook and restaurant specialist at his parents' insistence and worked in the family business from the age of fourteen. The demands of the trade cost him a move to the Rapid Wien youth setup and interrupted his playing altogether for two years.

Maierhofer played for FC Tulln before joining First Vienna for the 2002–03 season. He made 18 Regionalliga appearances and scored twice, then dropped to the fourth-tier Lower Austrian Landesliga with SV Langenrohr. Over two seasons at Langenrohr he established himself as the club's leading scorer while continuing to work shifts at the inn.

By 2005 his parents were pressing him to choose between football and the family business. Maierhofer wrote to several Austrian Bundesliga clubs by email and received no reply. When he learned that Daniel Sikorski was moving from the SKN St. Pölten academy to Bayern Munich, he asked Sikorski's agent to arrange a trial in Germany.

== Club career ==
=== Bayern Munich ===
Bayern allowed Maierhofer to train and to play in friendlies. He impressed in a match against the Hertha BSC reserves, after which reserve-team coach Hermann Gerland pushed for a two-year contract rather than the single year usually offered to players over 23. Maierhofer joined Bayern Munich II in July 2005 and scored 21 goals in 42 Regionalliga Süd appearances across two seasons, becoming club captain and top scorer in both campaigns.

He travelled with the first team to their pre-season camp in summer 2006 and made his Bundesliga debut on 28 October 2006, replacing Claudio Pizarro in a 2–0 home win over Eintracht Frankfurt after an injury to Lukas Podolski opened up a place in the squad. He later recalled that Oliver Kahn congratulated him on the pitch afterwards. A second substitute appearance followed, and his total playing time in the Bundesliga amounted to eleven minutes.

=== Koblenz, Greuther Fürth and Rapid Wien ===
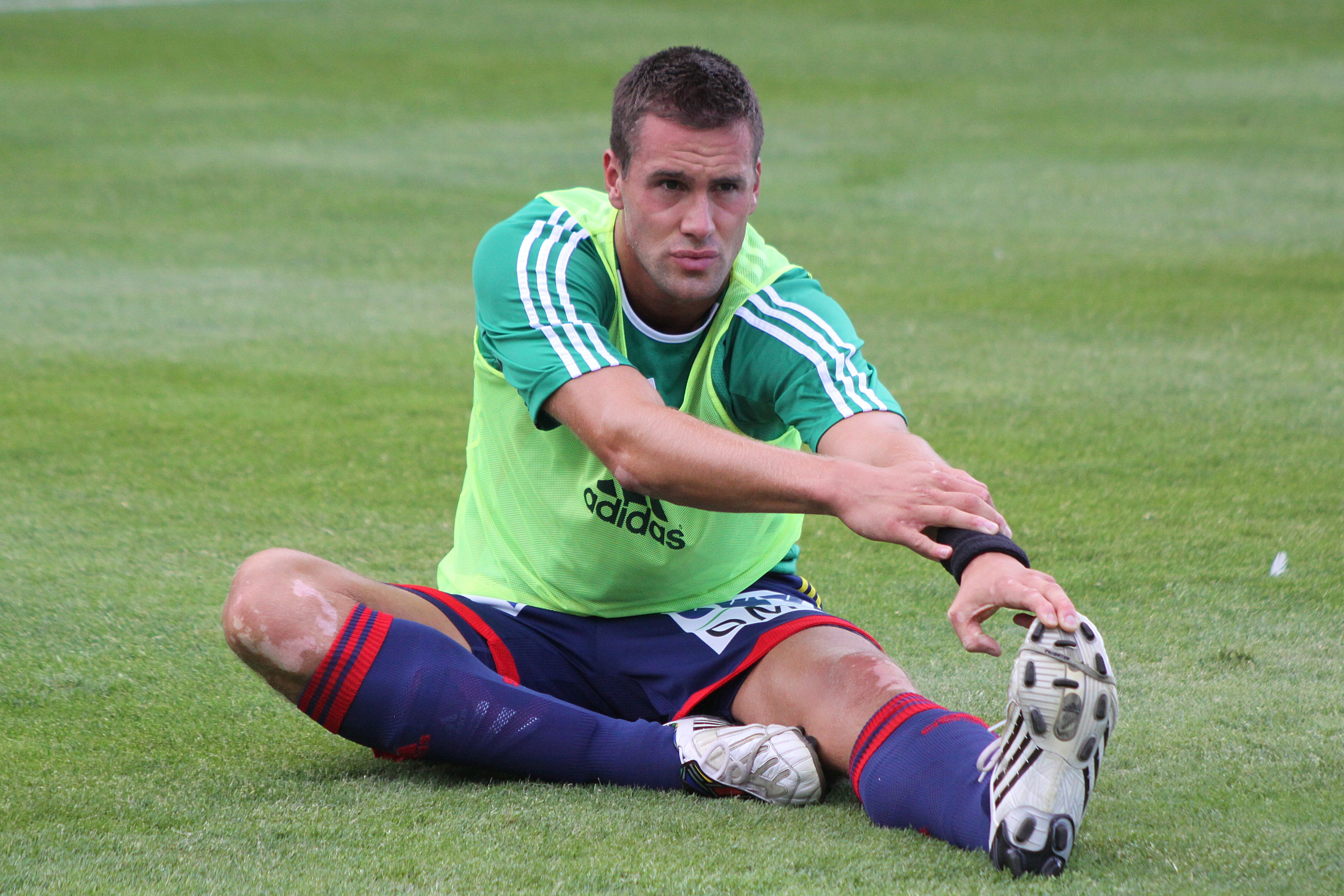
Maierhofer with Rapid Wien in 2009

Maierhofer joined TuS Koblenz of the 2. Bundesliga on 1 February 2007 and scored three goals in 14 league matches. In July 2007 he signed a two-year contract with another club in the division, Greuther Fürth, but started only rarely and made ten league appearances before the winter break.

Fürth loaned Maierhofer to Rapid Wien on 7 January 2008 for the second half of the 2007–08 season. He made his debut on 16 February 2008 as a substitute in a 2–0 win at Austria Kärnten and scored his first goal on 2 March at Sturm Graz. Seven goals in eleven league matches, five of them from the bench, proved decisive in the title run-in, and Rapid finished the season as champions. Among his goals were two in a derby win over Austria Wien and two in a 7–0 away win at title rivals Salzburg. Rapid signed him permanently on a three-year contract in summer 2008.

The 2008–09 season was the most productive of his career. He scored 23 league goals in 35 matches and 27 in all competitions, including two in Champions League qualifying. In January 2009 he recorded his second hat-trick in three games in an 8–1 win over SCR Altach, taking his tally for the season to 19. Rapid finished as runners-up. He formed a strike partnership with Erwin Hoffer that Austrian reporters nicknamed Maierhoffer.

=== Wolverhampton Wanderers ===
Maierhofer signed a three-year contract with newly promoted Premier League club Wolverhampton Wanderers on 31 August 2009 for an undisclosed fee reported as an initial £1.8 million. He scored on his debut on 12 September in a 3–1 defeat at Blackburn Rovers. A hernia injury then kept him out for several months, and he found no way back into the side.

In March 2010 he joined Championship club Bristol City on a one-month emergency loan. He made three appearances without scoring, and the loan was ended early.

Manager Mick McCarthy told Maierhofer in summer 2010 that he was no longer part of his plans, and he moved to MSV Duisburg of the 2. Bundesliga on a season-long loan. He scored 12 goals in 32 matches for Duisburg, including one in the DFB-Pokal semi-final that took the club to the final, where they lost to Schalke. He returned to Wolves for the 2011–12 season and made one further appearance as a substitute before leaving.

=== Red Bull Salzburg ===
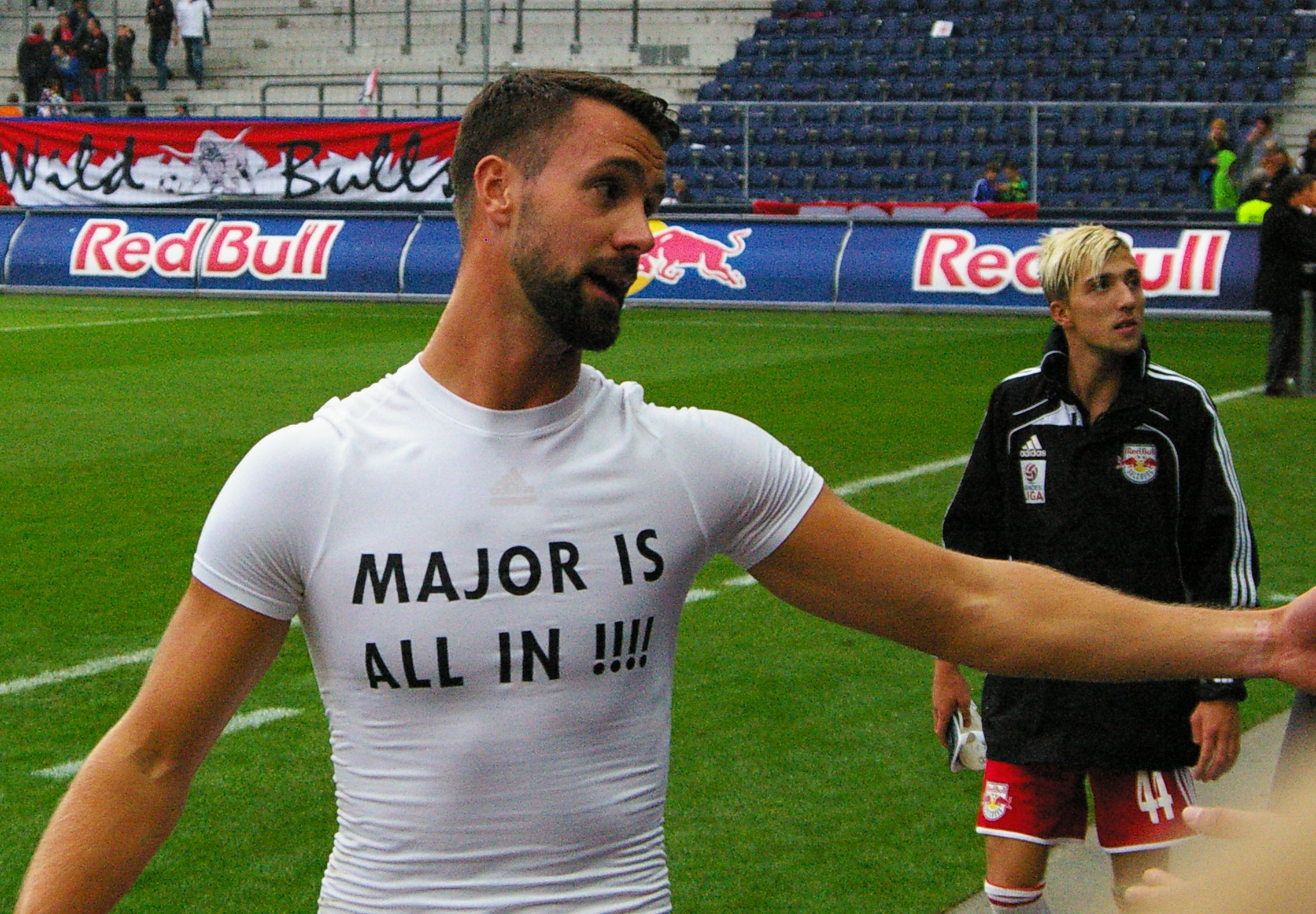
Maierhofer with Red Bull Salzburg in 2012

On 23 August 2011 Maierhofer returned to Austria on a two-year contract with Red Bull Salzburg. His signing was not universally welcomed, but his work rate won over supporters. He scored 14 league goals in the 2011–12 season to finish as joint top scorer with Jakob Jantscher of Rapid, and Salzburg completed the league and cup double. Under new manager Roger Schmidt he was used far less often in the 2012–13 season, and his contract was terminated on 7 January 2013.

=== Köln, Millwall and Wiener Neustadt ===
Maierhofer signed for 1. FC Köln of the 2. Bundesliga in January 2013 and left in the summer after 14 league appearances and one goal. He was without a club until 14 March 2014, when Millwall signed him on a short-term deal until the end of the 2013–14 season. Both of his goals for the club came in a 2–1 win at Middlesbrough in April.

On 19 November 2014 he signed a short-term contract with SC Wiener Neustadt of the Austrian Bundesliga. He started against Wolfsberger AC three days later and scored the opening goal in a 2–0 home win. In January 2015 Millwall manager Ian Holloway brought him back to London until the end of the season.

=== Trenčín and Mattersburg ===
Maierhofer signed a half-season contract with AS Trenčín on 12 February 2016. Trenčín won both the Slovak league and the Slovak Cup that season.

After half a year without a club he joined SV Mattersburg in January 2017 on a contract until that June, which was extended for a further year. He made 41 competitive appearances for Mattersburg and scored nine goals. He was used mainly as a substitute in his final season, and Mattersburg declined to extend his contract in May 2018, telling him the squad was to be made younger. During his time in Burgenland he worked as a youth coach at the Burgenland football academy while completing his UEFA A Licence.

=== Aarau and later career ===
Maierhofer was without a club for a further three months before signing for FC Aarau of the Swiss Challenge League on 11 September 2018. Aarau were bottom of the division with no points from six matches when he arrived. He scored 11 league goals in the 2018–19 season as the club climbed to second place and reached the promotion play-offs, where they lost to Neuchâtel Xamax. He extended his contract for a further year in June 2019, then left by mutual agreement in January 2020 after 40 league appearances.

Maierhofer returned to Austria with WSG Swarovski Tirol later in January 2020, joining the bottom club of the Austrian Bundesliga, and made 13 league appearances with two goals. In August 2020 he moved to Admira Wacker, and in December of that year he transferred within the same ownership group to Würzburger Kickers of the 2. Bundesliga, who were fighting relegation. Würzburg was the 22nd club of his career. He made seven league appearances without scoring, and the club was relegated.

=== Kremser SC and retirement ===
After a season without a club Maierhofer signed for Kremser SC of the Austrian Regionalliga East in July 2022, taking on a dual role as player and co-coach alongside Björn Wagner. He told the Kurier that the arrangement was intended to give him the head-coaching experience required to apply for the UEFA Pro Licence. He marked his debut on 29 July 2022 by coming on with Krems trailing and scoring the winner in a 2–1 away victory at FCM Traiskirchen.

Maierhofer made 20 league appearances and scored once in the 2022–23 season. He and Wagner both left the club at the end of the campaign, and in summer 2023 he announced his retirement at the age of 40 and took a role coaching talents at the Burgenland academy.

== International career ==
Maierhofer's form on loan at Rapid Wien earned him a first call-up in April 2008, when Josef Hickersberger named him in Austria's provisional squad for UEFA Euro 2008 on home soil, although he did not make the final selection. He made his debut under Karel Brückner on 20 August 2008 in a 2–2 friendly draw with Italy in Nice. His only international goal came after 49 seconds of a World Cup qualifier against the Faroe Islands in Graz on 5 September 2009, when he headed in a cross from Jakob Jantscher in a 3–1 win. He won 19 caps in total, the last of them in 2011.

== American football ==
In April 2025 Maierhofer announced on social media that he would return to professional sport that summer. On 12 May he confirmed on ServusTV that he had signed with the Vienna Vikings of the European League of Football as a placekicker. The Vikings had decided at the end of 2024 to add a former footballer to their kicking unit and had trialled several candidates. Owner Robin Lumsden said the club was looking for someone who fitted both athletically and personally. Former NFL kicker Giorgio Tavecchio was engaged as kicking coach to work with him.

Head coach Chris Calaycay said the team would introduce Maierhofer gradually and start him on kick-offs because of the strength of his leg. Maierhofer made his debut on 7 June 2025 against the Raiders Tirol at the Franz Horr Stadium, the home ground of Rapid's Vienna rivals Austria Wien. He opened the match with a kick-off of 63 yards and took three kick-offs in total, one of which fell short and drew a penalty. The Vikings won 41–7 in front of 10,275 spectators. Field goals and extra points remained the responsibility of Oskar Herz.

The Vikings finished the regular season with an 11–1 record and reached the championship game, where they lost 24–17 to the Stuttgart Surge in Stuttgart on 7 September 2025. Maierhofer had said before the season that reaching that match was his aim. He did not continue in the sport afterwards.

== Managerial career ==
Maierhofer completed the UEFA Pro Licence after retiring and worked as an individual coach at the Burgenland football academy. He had first set out that ambition in 2022, when he took the dual role at Kremser SC in order to accumulate the required senior coaching experience.

On 20 July 2026 Kremser SC appointed Maierhofer as head coach, his first senior post. The appointment came five days before the club's Austrian Cup tie with Austria Lustenau and followed the sudden departure of Philipp Zulechner to second-division ASK Voitsberg without having taken charge of a competitive match.

His first match in charge was the cup tie on 25 July 2026, which Krems lost 1–0 to Austria Lustenau in front of 1,500 spectators at the Sepp-Doll-Stadion through a headed goal by Precious Benjamin. NÖN reported that the performance drew praise despite the result. Krems took two points from their first four league matches of the 2026–27 season, drawing with SV Donau Wien and SC/ESV Parndorf and losing to SV Gloggnitz and FC Marchfeld Donauauen.

== Player profile ==
=== Style of play ===
Maierhofer stood 2.02 metres tall and played as a target man, relying on aerial strength and physical presence rather than technique. Hermann Gerland worked extensively on his heading at Bayern and made it the strongest part of his game. News wrote in 2017 that he was regularly criticised as too immobile and technically limited for his height, and that critics regarded his position as outdated. Writing in 2020, Kurier columnist Peter Linden judged that he had built a remarkable career without exceptional talent, standing instead for robustness and will.

=== Reception ===
Maierhofer divided opinion in Austria more than almost any other player of his generation, according to Laola1. kicker reported that Rapid Wien supporters treated him as persona non grata after he later played for Red Bull Salzburg, while at MSV Duisburg his commitment gave him something close to legendary status. ORF described him in 2025 as a polarising figure in his career.

== Personal life ==
Maierhofer is married and has two children. Away from playing he has worked as a public speaker and as an ambassador for the player advisory firm Sportscon. He has also supported Spielerpass, an Austrian charity that organises sport for people with special needs.

== Career statistics ==
=== Club ===
Appearances and goals by club, season and competition (Note: Figures for SV Langenrohr between 2003 and 2005 are not included, as season-by-season data for the Lower Austrian Landesliga is not available.)
Club	Season	League			Cup		Europe		Other		Total	
Club	Season	Division	Apps	Goals	Apps	Goals	Apps	Goals	Apps	Goals	Apps	Goals
First Vienna FC	2002–03	Austrian Regionalliga East	18	2	0	0	—		—		18	2
Bayern Munich II	2005–06	Regionalliga Süd	28	10	—		—		—		28	10
Bayern Munich II	2006–07	Regionalliga Süd	14	11	—		—		—		14	11
Bayern Munich II	Total		42	21	—		—		—		42	21
Bayern Munich	2006–07	Bundesliga	2	0	0	0	0	0	—		2	0
TuS Koblenz	2006–07	2. Bundesliga	14	3	0	0	—		—		14	3
Greuther Fürth	2007–08	2. Bundesliga	10	2	2	1	—		—		12	3
Rapid Wien	2007–08	Austrian Bundesliga	11	7	0	0	0	0	—		11	7
Rapid Wien	2008–09	Austrian Bundesliga	35	23	3	2	2	2	—		40	27
Rapid Wien	2009–10	Austrian Bundesliga	3	1	1	1	5	2	—		9	4
Rapid Wien	Total		49	31	4	3	7	4	—		60	38
Wolverhampton Wanderers	2009–10	Premier League	8	1	0	0	—		1 (Note: Appearance in the League Cup)	0	9	1
Wolverhampton Wanderers	2011–12	Premier League	1	0	0	0	—		—		1	0
Wolverhampton Wanderers	Total		9	1	0	0	—		1	0	10	1
Bristol City (loan)	2009–10	Championship	3	0	0	0	—		—		3	0
MSV Duisburg (loan)	2010–11	2. Bundesliga	27	8	5	4	—		—		32	12
Red Bull Salzburg	2011–12	Austrian Bundesliga	29	14	3	1	7	0	—		39	15
Red Bull Salzburg	2012–13	Austrian Bundesliga	10	1	2	1	2	0	—		14	2
Red Bull Salzburg	Total		39	15	5	2	9	0	—		53	17
1. FC Köln	2012–13	2. Bundesliga	14	1	0	0	—		—		14	1
Millwall	2013–14	Championship	11	2	0	0	—		—		11	2
SC Wiener Neustadt	2014–15	Austrian Bundesliga	4	1	0	0	—		—		4	1
Millwall	2014–15	Championship	10	1	0	0	—		—		10	1
AS Trenčín	2015–16	Slovak Super Liga	10	2	1	1	—		—		11	3
SV Mattersburg	2016–17	Austrian Bundesliga	14	2	0	0	—		—		14	2
SV Mattersburg	2017–18	Austrian Bundesliga	23	5	4	2	—		—		27	7
SV Mattersburg	Total		37	7	4	2	—		—		41	9
FC Aarau	2018–19	Swiss Challenge League	26	11	1	0	—		2 (Note: Appearances in the Swiss Super League promotion play-offs)	1	29	12
FC Aarau	2019–20	Swiss Challenge League	14	2	2	0	—		—		16	2
FC Aarau	Total		40	13	3	0	—		2	1	45	14
WSG Swarovski Tirol	2019–20	Austrian Bundesliga	13	2	1	0	—		—		14	2
Admira Wacker	2020–21	Austrian Bundesliga	7	0	2	0	—		—		9	0
Würzburger Kickers	2020–21	2. Bundesliga	7	0	0	0	—		—		7	0
Kremser SC	2022–23	Regionalliga East	20	1	0	0	—		—		20	1
Career total			386	113	27	13	16	4	3	1	432	131

=== International ===
Appearances and goals by national team and year
National team	Year	Apps	Goals
Austria	2008	3	0
Austria	2009	7	1
Austria	2010	4	0
Austria	2011	5	0
Total		19	1

Score and result list Austria's goal tally first.

No.	Date	Venue	Opponent	Score	Result	Competition
1	5 September 2009	UPC-Arena, Graz, Austria	Faroe Islands	1–0	3–1	2010 FIFA World Cup qualification

== Managerial statistics ==
As of match played 21 August 2026

Managerial record by team and tenure
Team	Nat.	From	To	Record								Ref.
Team	Nat.	From	To	G	W	D	L	GF	GA	GD	Win %	Ref.
Kremser SC	(Austria)	20 July 2026	Present	5	0	2	3	4	9	−5	0.00	
Career Total				5	0	2	3	4	9	−5	0.00	

== Honours ==
=== Association football ===
Rapid Wien

- Austrian Football Bundesliga: 2007–08

MSV Duisburg

- DFB-Pokal runner-up: 2010–11

Red Bull Salzburg

- Austrian Football Bundesliga: 2011–12
- Austrian Cup: 2011–12

AS Trenčín

- Slovak First Football League: 2015–16
- Slovak Cup: 2015–16

Individual

- Austrian Football Bundesliga top scorer: 2011–12

=== American football ===
Vienna Vikings

- European League of Football runner-up: 2025
