= Wien-Umgebung District =

Coordinates: 48°18′N 16°19′E

Wien-Umgebung District Bezirk Wien-Umgebung
- District
- Interactive map of Wien-Umgebung District
- Country: Austria
- State: Lower Austria
- Number of municipalities: 21

Area
  - Total: 484.5 km^{2} (187.1 sq mi)

Population (1 January 2016)
  - Total: 120,446
  - Density: 248.6/km^{2} (643.9/sq mi)
- Time zone: UTC+01:00 (CET)
  - Summer (DST): UTC+02:00 (CEST)
- Vehicle registration: WU
- NUTS code: AT126, AT127

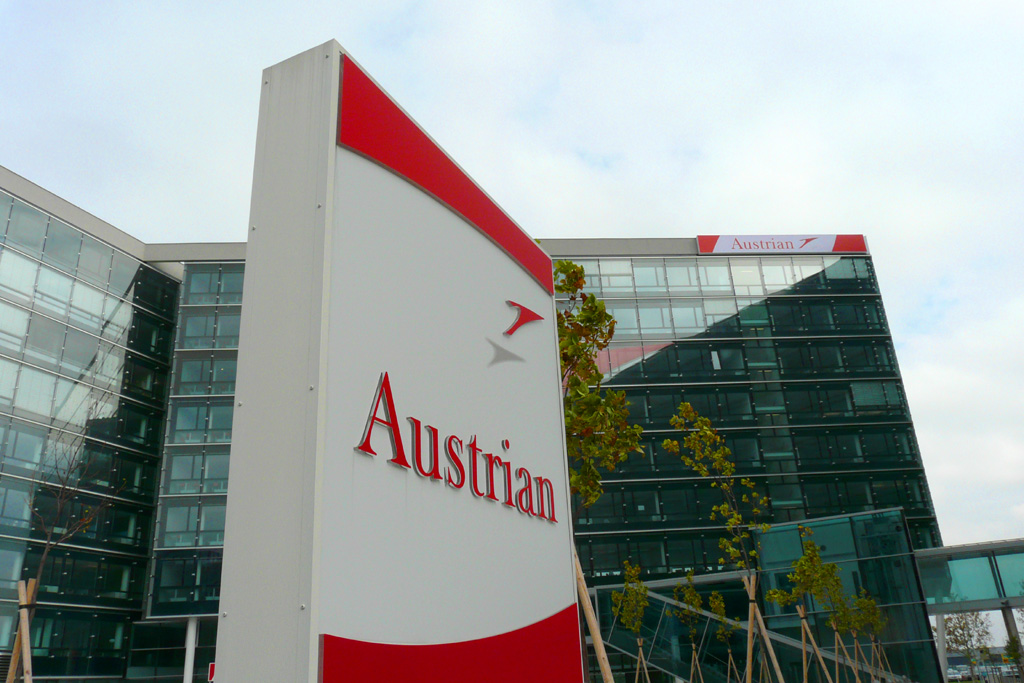
Austrian Airlines headquarters

Bezirk Wien-Umgebung was a district of the state of Lower Austria in Austria. The district comprised four non-contiguous districts on the outer fringes of Vienna: Klosterneuburg and Gerasdorf to the north of the city, Schwechat to its south-east and Purkersdorf on Vienna's western side.

Vienna International Airport, the headquarters of Austrian Airlines, and the headquarters of Niki are in the city of Schwechat, in the district.

The district existed from 1954 to 2016. In 2017 the municipalities became part of four adjacent districts.

== Municipalities ==
Suburbs, hamlets and other subdivisions of a municipality are indicated by lower dots.

- Ebergassing
  - Ebergassing, Wienerherberg
- Fischamend
  - Fischamend-Dorf, Fischamend-Markt
- Gablitz
- Gerasdorf bei Wien
  - Gerasdorf, Föhrenhain, Kapellerfeld, Oberlisse, Seyring
- Gramatneusiedl
- Himberg
  - Himberg, Velm, Pellendorf, Gutenhof
- Klein-Neusiedl
- Klosterneuburg
  - Höflein an der Donau, Kierling, Klosterneuburg, Kritzendorf, Maria Gugging, Weidling, Weidlingbach
- Lanzendorf
- Leopoldsdorf
- Maria Lanzendorf
- Mauerbach
  - Hainbuch, Mauerbach, Steinbach
- Moosbrunn
- Pressbaum
  - Au am Kraking, Pfalzau, Pressbaum, Rekawinkel
- Purkersdorf
- Rauchenwarth
- Schwadorf
- Schwechat
  - Kledering, Mannswörth, Rannersdorf, Schwechat
- Tullnerbach
  - Irenental, Tullnerbach-Lawies, Untertullnerbach
- Wolfsgraben
- Zwölfaxing

== Dissolution ==
The district Wien-Umgebung was dissolved in 2017; 13 municipalities in the South East became part of the Bruck an der Leitha District, namely Ebergassing, Fischamend, Gramatneusiedl, Himberg, Klein-Neusiedl, Lanzendorf, Leopoldsdorf, Maria Lanzendorf, Moosbrunn, Rauchenwarth, Schwadorf, Schwechat and Zwölfaxing. Six municipalities in the West became part of the Sankt Pölten-Land District, namely Gablitz, Mauerbach, Pressbaum, Purkersdorf, Tullnerbach and Wolfsgraben. Klosterneuburg in the North West became part of the Tulln District and Gerasdorf bei Wien in the North East became part of the Korneuburg District.

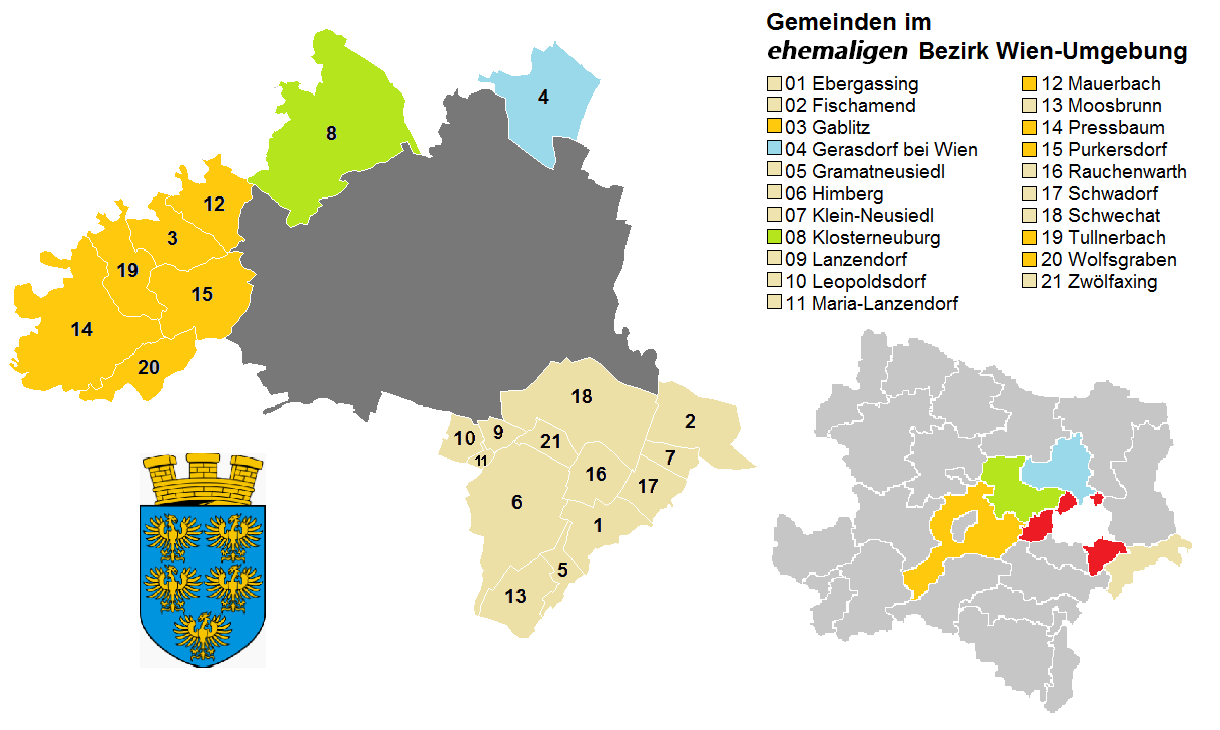
Situation in 2017
