= Maria Lanzendorf =

Maria-Lanzendorf
- Municipality
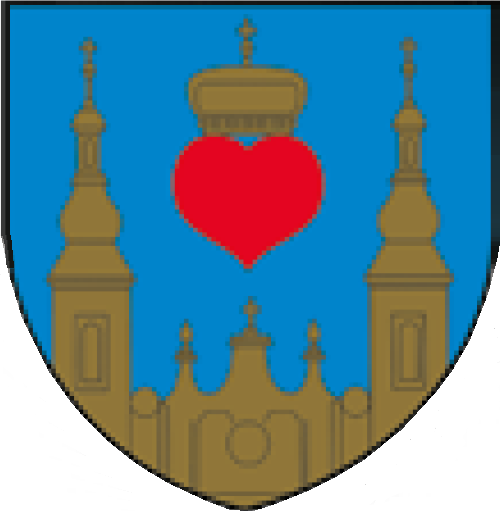
- Coat of arms

- Location within Austria
- Coordinates: 48°05′59″N 16°25′16″E
- Country: Austria
- State: Lower Austria
- District: Bruck an der Leitha

Government
  - Mayor: Peter Wolf (SPÖ)

Area
  - Total: 1.7 km^{2} (0.66 sq mi)
- Elevation: 171 m (561 ft)

Population (2018-01-01)
  - Total: 2,129
  - Density: 1,300/km^{2} (3,200/sq mi)
- Time zone: UTC+1 (CET)
  - Summer (DST): UTC+2 (CEST)
- Postal code: 2326
- Area code: 02235
- Vehicle registration: BL
- Website: www.maria-lanzendorf.gv.at

Maria-Lanzendorf is a municipality in the district of Bruck an der Leitha in the Austrian state of Lower Austria.

It belonged to Wien-Umgebung District which was dissolved in 2016.

== Population ==
Historical population
Year	Pop.	±%
1971	1,147	—
1981	1,107	−3.5%
1991	1,487	+34.3%
2001	1,894	+27.4%
2011	2,045	+8.0%
2021	2,156	+5.4%
