= Moosbrunn =

- Municipality
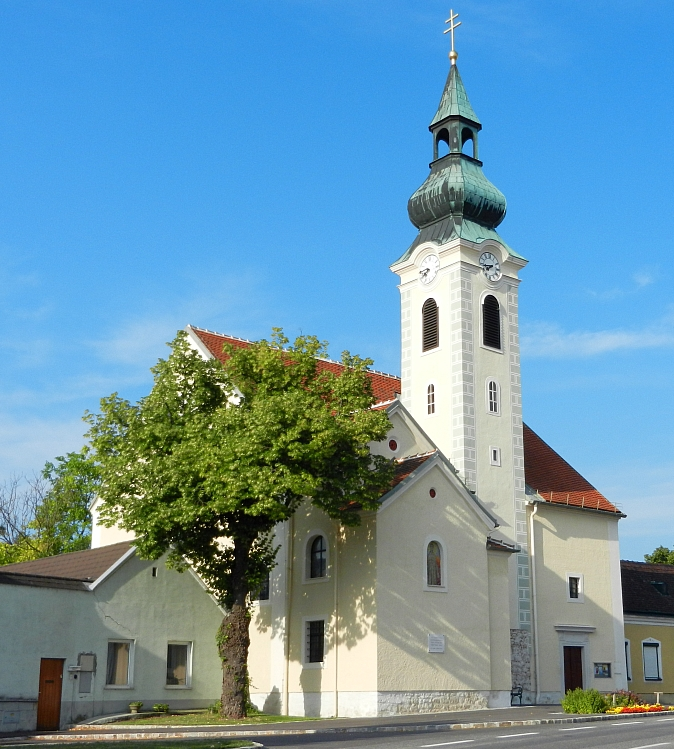
- Moosbrunn parish church

- Coat of arms

- Location within Austria
- Coordinates: 48°01′00″N 16°27′00″E
- Country: Austria
- State: Lower Austria
- District: Bruck an der Leitha

Government
  - Mayor: Paul Frühling (ÖVP)

Area
  - Total: 16.91 km^{2} (6.53 sq mi)
- Elevation: 186 m (610 ft)

Population (2018-01-01)
  - Total: 1,777
  - Density: 105.1/km^{2} (272.2/sq mi)
- Time zone: UTC+1 (CET)
  - Summer (DST): UTC+2 (CEST)
- Postal code: 2440, 2441
- Area code: 02234
- Vehicle registration: BL
- Website: www.moosbrunn.at

Moosbrunn is a municipality in the district of Bruck an der Leitha in the Austrian state of Lower Austria.

It belonged to Wien-Umgebung District which was dissolved at the end of 2016.

== Population ==
Historical population
Year	Pop.	±%
1971	1,197	—
1981	1,278	+6.8%
1991	1,466	+14.7%
2001	1,522	+3.8%
2011	1,610	+5.8%
2021	1,778	+10.4%
