= Rauchenwarth =

- Municipality
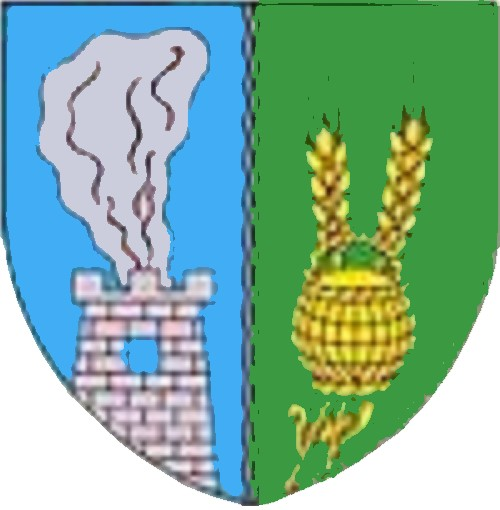
- Coat of arms

- Location within Austria
- Coordinates: 48°06′00″N 16°31′00″E
- Country: Austria
- State: Lower Austria
- District: Bruck an der Leitha

Government
  - Mayor: Ernst Schüller (ÖVP)

Area
  - Total: 13.4 km^{2} (5.2 sq mi)
- Elevation: 206 m (676 ft)

Population (2018-01-01)
  - Total: 742
  - Density: 55.4/km^{2} (143/sq mi)
- Time zone: UTC+1 (CET)
  - Summer (DST): UTC+2 (CEST)
- Postal code: 2320
- Area code: 02230
- Vehicle registration: BL
- Website: www.rauchenwarth.gv.at

Rauchenwarth is a municipality in the district of Bruck an der Leitha in the Austrian state of Lower Austria. It belonged to Wien-Umgebung District which was dissolved at the end of 2016.

== Population ==
Historical population
Year	Pop.	±%
1971	474	—
1981	468	−1.3%
1991	514	+9.8%
2001	602	+17.1%
