= Leopoldsdorf =

- Municipality
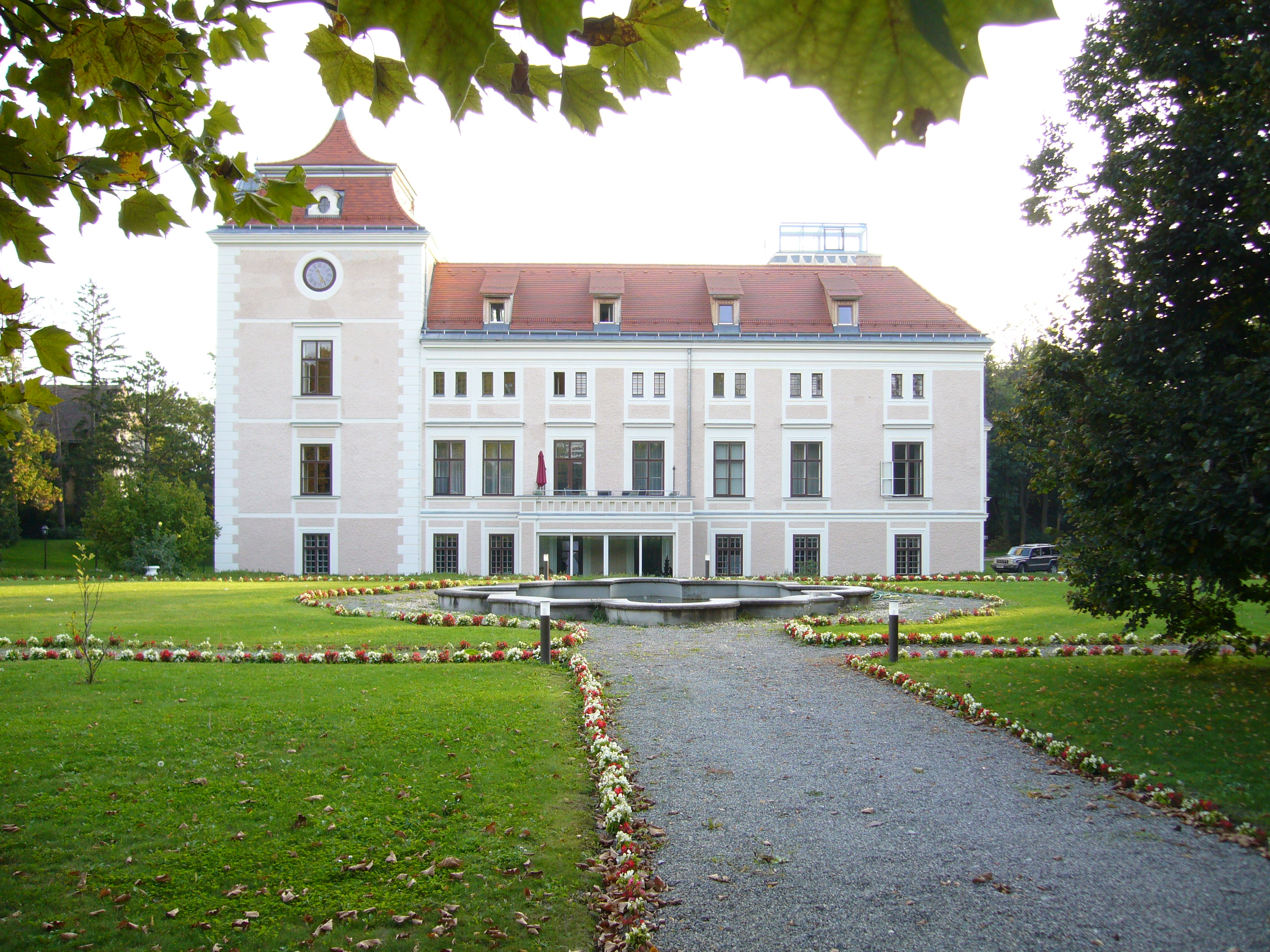
- Leopoldsdorf Castle

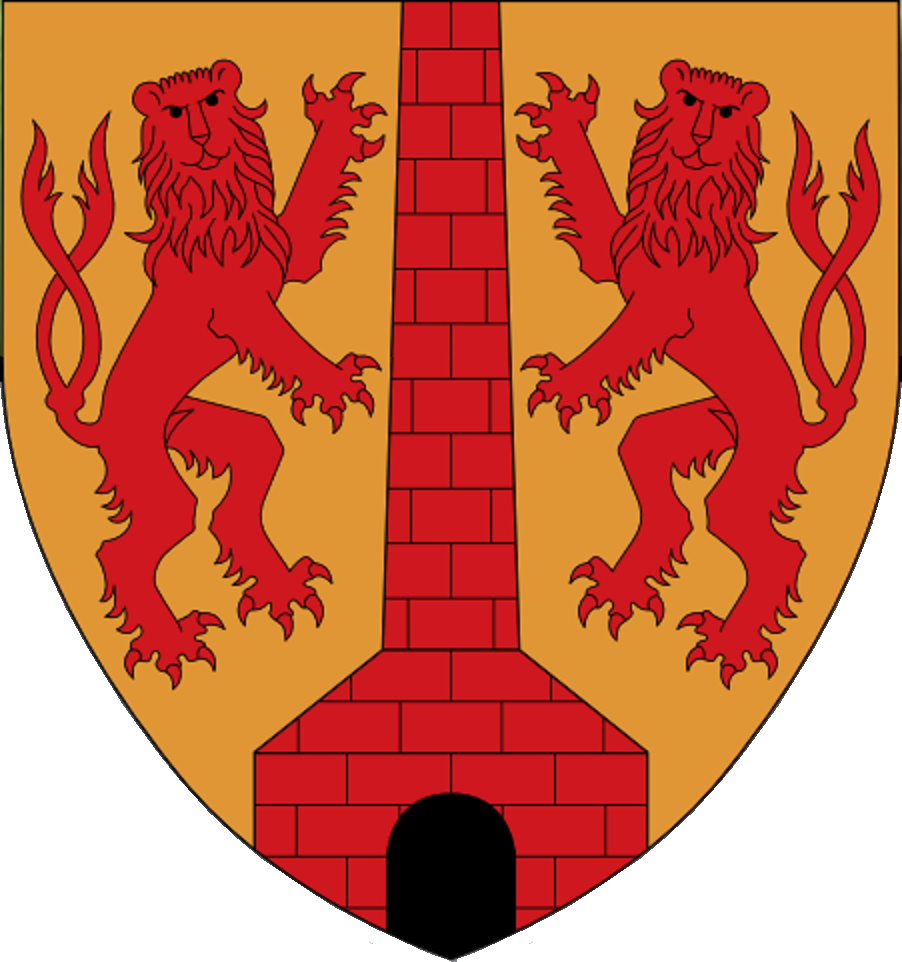
- Coat of arms

- Location within Austria
- Coordinates: 48°07′00″N 16°23′00″E
- Country: Austria
- State: Lower Austria
- District: Bruck an der Leitha

Government
  - Mayor: Fritz Blasnek (ÖVP)

Area
  - Total: 6.98 km^{2} (2.69 sq mi)
- Elevation: 161 m (528 ft)

Population (2018-01-01)
  - Total: 5,078
  - Density: 728/km^{2} (1,880/sq mi)
- Time zone: UTC+1 (CET)
  - Summer (DST): UTC+2 (CEST)
- Postal code: 2333
- Area code: 02235
- Vehicle registration: BL
- Website: www.leopoldsdorf.gv.at

Leopoldsdorf is a municipality in the district of Bruck an der Leitha in the Austrian state of Lower Austria. Under Nazi rule, it belonged to Greater Vienna from 1938 onwards. It regained its status as a municipality in 1954.

It belonged to Wien-Umgebung District which was dissolved in 2016.

== Population ==
Historical population
Year	Pop.	±%
1971	2,424	—
1981	2,413	−0.5%
1991	2,627	+8.9%
2001	3,436	+30.8%
2011	4,697	+36.7%
2021	5,250	+11.8%
