= Citizen's police academy =

A citizen's police academy is a program designed to acquaint community residents who are not sworn police officers with the activities of their local police department.

The programs vary by department. One common feature is the option to participate in a ride-along with a police officer for a shift to see what a day as a police officer is like.

== Typical academy content ==
Programs include topics like:

- Department organization and ethics
- Air support
- Bomb squad
- Cadet training
- Crime scene investigation
- Criminal and youth investigation
- Dispatch tour
- Domestic violence
- Firearms training
- Forensics
- Homicide
- Jail tours
- K-9 demonstrations
- Overview of the legal system - criminal/constitutional law
- Recruiting
- Station tour
- SWAT demonstrations
- Traffic/DWI enforcement
- Use of force - patrol procedures

== Related programs ==
- Citizen's fire academy
- Community emergency response team
