= Ebergassing =

- Municipality
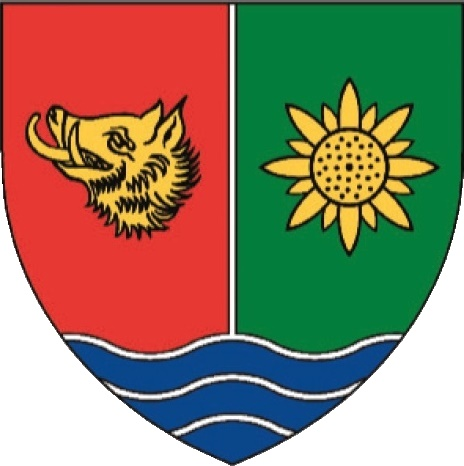
- Coat of arms

- Location within Austria
- Coordinates: 48°02′45″N 16°30′58″E
- Country: Austria
- State: Lower Austria
- District: Bruck an der Leitha

Government
  - Mayor: Roman Stachelberger (SPÖ)

Area
  - Total: 16.27 km^{2} (6.28 sq mi)
- Elevation: 180 m (590 ft)

Population (2018-01-01)
  - Total: 3,904
  - Density: 240.0/km^{2} (621.5/sq mi)
- Time zone: UTC+1 (CET)
  - Summer (DST): UTC+2 (CEST)
- Postal code: 2435
- Area code: 02234 Ebergassing; 02230 Wienerherberg
- Vehicle registration: BL
- Website: www.ebergassing.at

Ebergassing is a municipality in the district of Bruck an der Leitha in the Austrian state of Lower Austria. It formerly belonged to Wien-Umgebung District which was dissolved at the end of 2016.

== Population ==
Historical population
Year	Pop.	±%
1971	2,549	—
1981	2,746	+7.7%
1991	2,880	+4.9%
2001	3,449	+19.8%
2011	3,823	+10.8%
2021	4,006	+4.8%
2026	4,402	+9.9%
