= Gramatneusiedl =

- Municipality
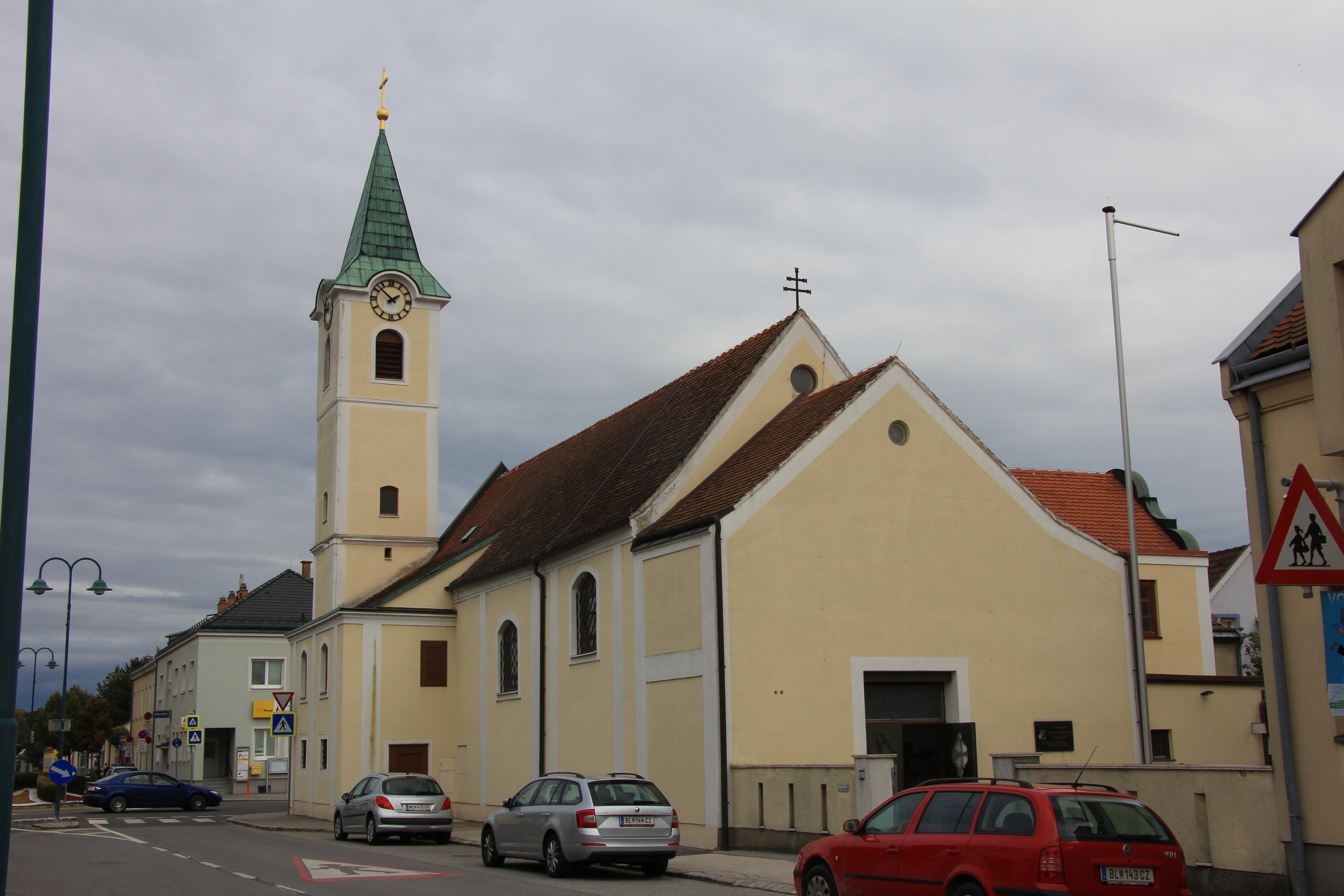
- Gramatneusiedl parish church

- Coat of arms

- Location within Austria
- Coordinates: 48°01′19″N 16°29′33″E
- Country: Austria
- State: Lower Austria
- District: Bruck an der Leitha

Government
  - Mayor: Thomas Schwab (SPÖ)

Area
  - Total: 6.73 km^{2} (2.60 sq mi)
- Elevation: 179 m (587 ft)

Population (2018-01-01)
  - Total: 3,461
  - Density: 514/km^{2} (1,330/sq mi)
- Time zone: UTC+1 (CET)
  - Summer (DST): UTC+2 (CEST)
- Postal code: 2440
- Area code: 02234
- Vehicle registration: BL
- Website: www.gramatneusiedl.at

Gramatneusiedl is a municipality in the district of Bruck an der Leitha in the Austrian state of Lower Austria.

It belonged to Wien-Umgebung District which was dissolved in 2016.

== Population ==
Historical population
| Year | Pop. | ±% |
|---|---|---|
| 1971 | 2,048 | — |
| 1981 | 2,071 | +1.1% |
| 1991 | 2,176 | +5.1% |
| 2001 | 2,243 | +3.1% |
| 2011 | 2,895 | +29.1% |
| 2021 | 3,639 | +25.7% |

== Marienthal Job Guarantee ==
In 2020 Gramatneusiedl received international attention, when the Public Employment Service (AMS) in cooperation with University of Oxford economists Maximilian Kasy and Lukas Lehner started a job guarantee pilot in the municipality. The municipality became famous a century earlier through a landmark study in empirical social research when Marie Jahoda, Paul Lazarsfeld and Hans Zeisel studied the consequences of mass unemployment on a community in the wake of the Great Depression. The current job guarantee pilot returned to the site to study the opposite: what happens when unemployed people are guaranteed a job? The program offers jobs to every unemployed job seeker who has been without a paid job for more than a year. When a job seeker is placed with a private company, the Public Employment Service pays 100% of the wage for the first three months, and 66% during the subsequent nine months. Though, most of the long-term jobless were placed in non-profit training companies tasked with repairing second-hand furniture, renovating housing, public gardening, and similar jobs. The pilot eliminated long-term unemployment – an important result, given the programme’s entirely voluntary nature. Participants’ gained greater financial security, improved their psycho-social stability and social inclusion. The study drew international attention and informed policy reports by the EU, OECD, UN, and ILO. The program ended in 2024 and served as the basis for the European Commission's Social Fund + (ESF+) to provide 23 million EUR for further job guarantee pilots across Europe.
