= Mauerbach =

- Municipality
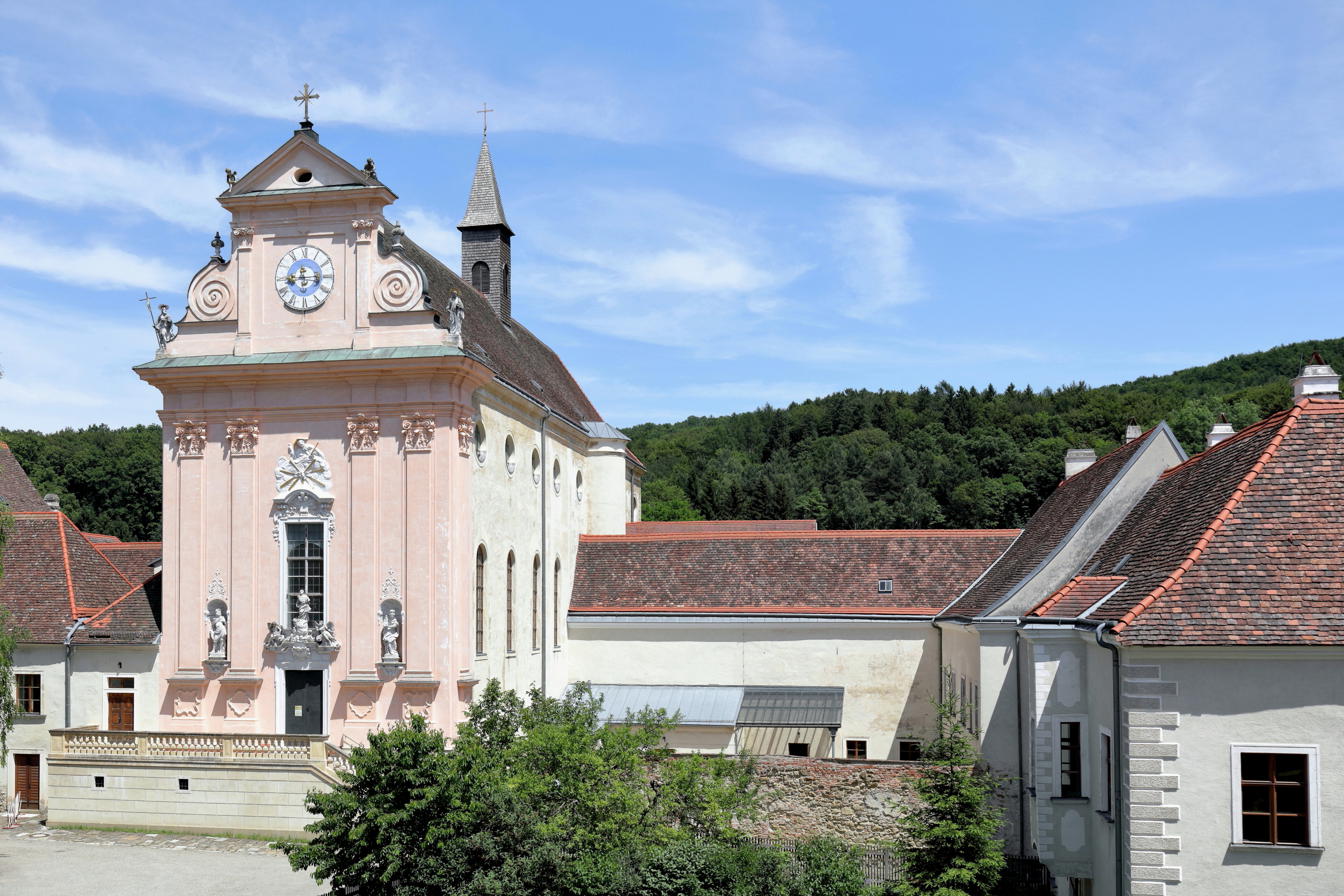
- Monastery church and prelate court

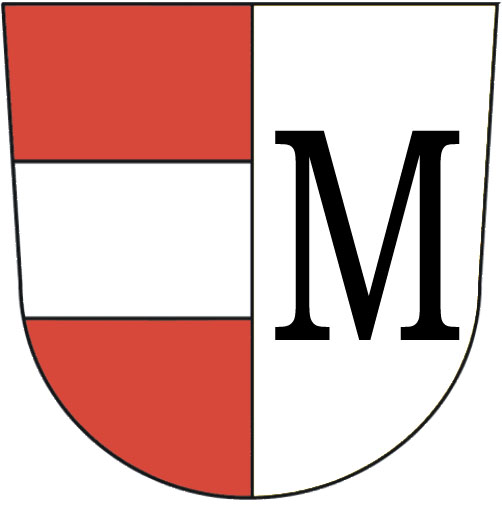
- Coat of arms

- Location within Austria
- Coordinates: 48°14′30″N 16°10′35″E
- Country: Austria
- State: Lower Austria
- District: Sankt Pölten-Land

Government
  - Mayor: Peter Buchner (ÖVP)

Area
  - Total: 20.32 km^{2} (7.85 sq mi)
- Elevation: 282 m (925 ft)

Population (2018-01-01)
  - Total: 3,661
  - Density: 180.2/km^{2} (466.6/sq mi)
- Time zone: UTC+1 (CET)
  - Summer (DST): UTC+2 (CEST)
- Postal code: 1140, 3001, 3400
- Area code: 01/979, 01/577
- Vehicle registration: PL
- Website: www.mauerbach.gv.at

Mauerbach is a town on the western boundary of Vienna, Austria.

== Population ==
Historical population
Year	Pop.	±%
1971	1,576	—
1981	2,227	+41.3%
1991	3,222	+44.7%
2001	3,415	+6.0%

== Sights ==
It hosts the summer houses of many rich Viennese families as well as Mauerbach Charterhouse (Kartause Mauerbach), a Carthusian monastery founded in 1313, closed in 1782.

== Sport ==
The village is also home to association football team SC Mauerbach, who play in Austria's lower leagues.

== Recent times ==
Since 2017 the town belongs to the district of St. Pölten. It was formerly in Wien-Umgebung which was dissolved in 2016.

== Nazi looted art depot ==
In 1985, 496 paintings, 146 drawings, watercolors, prints and sculptures and thousands of books and other items that the Allies had recovered after World War II and turned over to the Austrian authorities so that they could return them to their rightful owners were found to be still stored in Mauerbach. Visits had not been allowed and the list had not been published. Investigative news articles revealed the cache of artworks and caused a scandal.
