= Klein-Neusiedl =

- Municipality
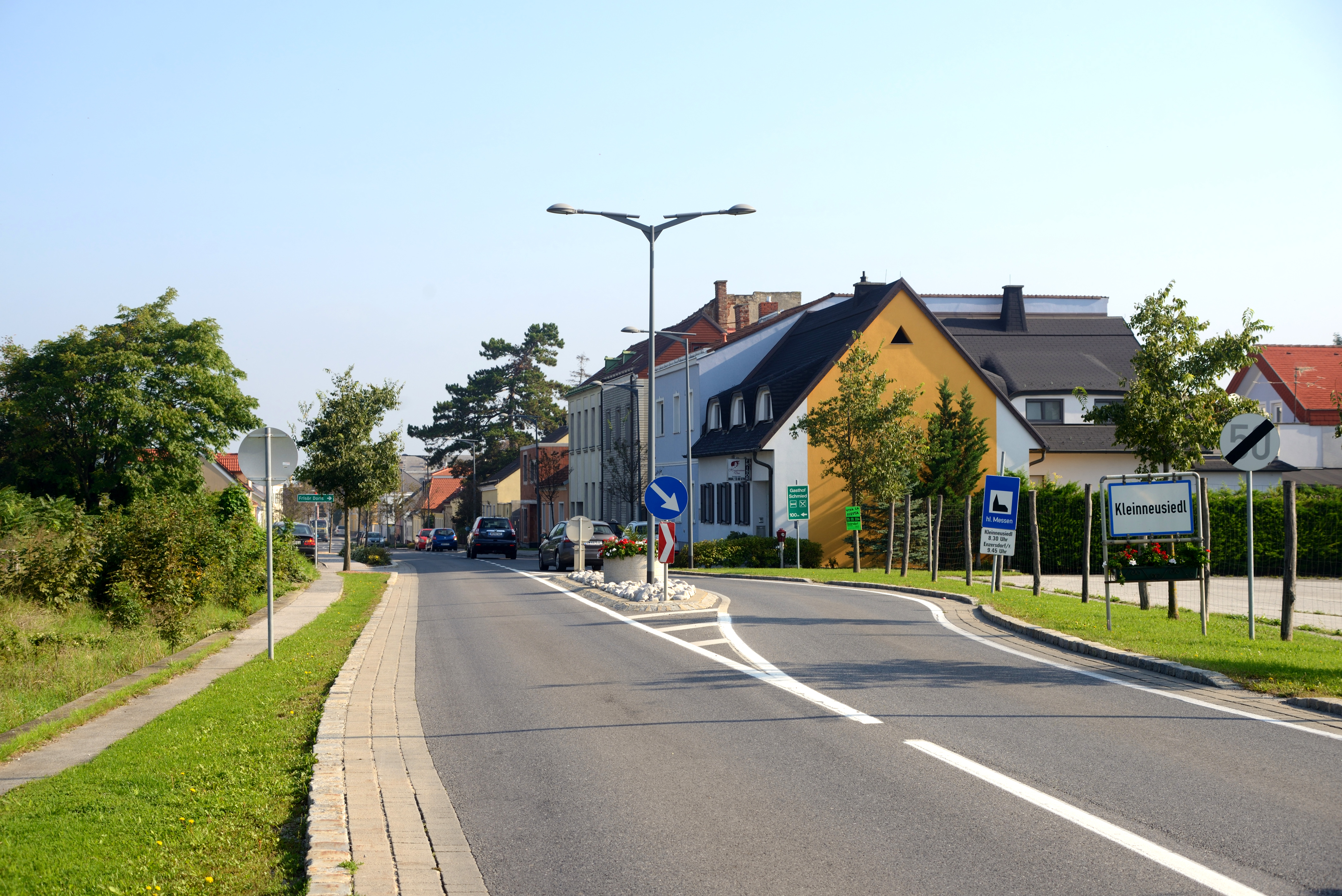
- Village entrance

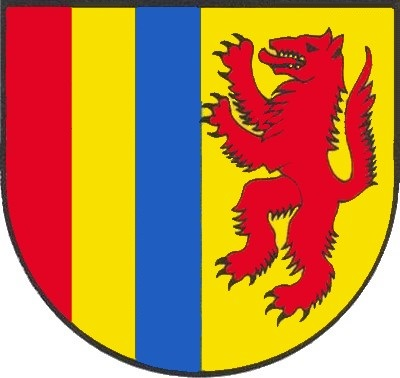
- Coat of arms

- Location within Austria
- Coordinates: 48°05′27″N 16°36′16″E
- Country: Austria
- State: Lower Austria
- District: Bruck an der Leitha

Government
  - Mayor: Robert Szekely (SPÖ)

Area
  - Total: 5.97 km^{2} (2.31 sq mi)
- Elevation: 159 m (522 ft)

Population (2018-01-01)
  - Total: 907
  - Density: 152/km^{2} (393/sq mi)
- Time zone: UTC+1 (CET)
  - Summer (DST): UTC+2 (CEST)
- Postal code: 2431
- Area code: 02230
- Vehicle registration: BL
- Website: www.klein-neusiedl.gv.at

Klein-Neusiedl is a municipality in the district of Bruck an der Leitha in the Austrian state of Lower Austria.

It belonged to Wien-Umgebung District which was dissolved in 2016.

== Population ==
Historical population
| Year | Pop. | ±% |
|---|---|---|
| 1971 | 1,011 | — |
| 1981 | 915 | −9.5% |
| 1991 | 864 | −5.6% |
| 2001 | 854 | −1.2% |
| 2011 | 787 | −7.8% |
| 2021 | 970 | +23.3% |
