= Ride-along =

Chance for civilians to ride in emergency vehicles

A ride-along is an arrangement for a civilian to spend a shift in the passenger seat of an emergency vehicle, observing the work day of a police officer, firefighter, paramedic, or security.

Ride-alongs are offered by many police departments worldwide. There is a minimum age to participate in a ride-along. Depending on the department, it is often somewhere between the ages of 12 and 18. When participation of those under 18 is permitted, consent from a parent or legal guardian is required. Individuals with criminal records or those under investigation by any law enforcement agency are prohibited from participating. People who also have problems with previous ride-alongs may also be denied. When citizens are selected for a ride-along, they must read and sign a waiver stating the rules and expectations for participating, as well as agreeing that situations can turn dangerous at any time. The most common form of ride-alongs are Law Enforcement Explorers, Auxiliary or Volunteer Police officers, and participants in Citizen's Police Academy programs.

People go on ride-alongs for various reasons. These include interest in a future career in law enforcement, personal interest in law enforcement officers without such a career, journalists wishing to write reports, and those interested in community relations. Some emergency departments require dispatchers to go on ride-alongs so they can get a first-hand feel for the area they are responsible for. Regardless of the reason, all citizens who meet the department's eligibility requirements are generally welcome to participate in a ride-along.

The television show Cops is made with a variety of police ride-alongs put into a half-hour segment.

== Issues with ride-alongs ==
Ride-alongs face a variety of issues.

For the most part, the safety of the person on the ride-along must be considered. Officers with ride-alongs generally drop off the person in a safe place before an emergency response if they believe the call may pose a danger, and another available officer will attempt to pick up the person. Many departments require applicants to sign a liability waiver before participation. It is not always possible for the officer to avoid a situation in which the person riding along may be in danger.

In 2007, a woman in Boise, Idaho, was on a ride-along when she witnessed two police officers fatally shoot a suspect following a high-speed chase.

The TV series Top Cops, which aired 1990–1993, once told the true story of the 8-year-old son of a police officer whose father took him on a ride-along after obtaining an exemption to the department's policy in which the minimum to apply was 14. During the shift, the officer was called to a bank robbery, in which the robber claimed to be armed with a live-wire bomb, and demanded the tellers take him to the vault. The boy, who did not understand the potential danger, was not harmed.

Most participants in ride-alongs do not have ill intentions; however, in 1991, famed journalist and serial killer Jack Unterweger went on a ride-along with the Los Angeles Police Department allegedly to learn the location of the area's red light districts. Shortly thereafter, several area prostitutes were murdered, and Unterweger was considered the prime suspect.

In the United States, ride-alongs have raised privacy concerns. In 1999, the U.S. Supreme Court ruled that allowing journalists or photographers to enter and film private homes during a ride-along is a violation of the Fourth Amendment.

== In fiction ==
The 1993 film Cop and a Half portrays a boy on a ride-along, who witnesses a murder committed by a gang.

In the TV series Friends, the episode entitled "The One with the Ride-Along" features Chandler, Joey, and Ross on a ride-along with Phoebe's then-boyfriend, Gary, who was a police officer.

In The Simpsons episode "Separate Vocations", Bart Simpson goes on a ride-along with Springfield police officers Eddie and Lou, following an aptitude test which suggests that Bart is best suited as a police officer.

An episode of Everybody Loves Raymond, "The Ride-Along", involves Ray going on a ride-along with his cop brother, Robert.

In the first episode of the TV series Breaking Bad, Walter White goes on a ride-along with his DEA agent brother-in-law, Hank Schrader.

In the 2009 film Observe and Report, Ronnie Barnhardt (Seth Rogen's character) goes on a ride-along.

The 2014 film Ride Along focuses on a security guard (Kevin Hart) going on a ride-along with a police officer (Ice Cube) whose sister he wants to marry.

In 2016 TV series Lucifer features Lucifer Morningstar working with LAPD Detective Chloe Decker, with the latter referring to the former as a "glorified ride-along" in the fifth episode.

In 9-1-1 episode titled "Awful People", Maddie Kendall, a 911 dispatcher, goes on a ride-along with LAPD Sergeant Athena Grant as part of her training.

In the episode named "The Ride Along" of the 2018 TV series The Rookie, a Hollywood director goes on a ride-along with LAPD officers John Nolan and Talia Bishop to research for his new film.
