= Gerasdorf bei Wien =

- Municipality
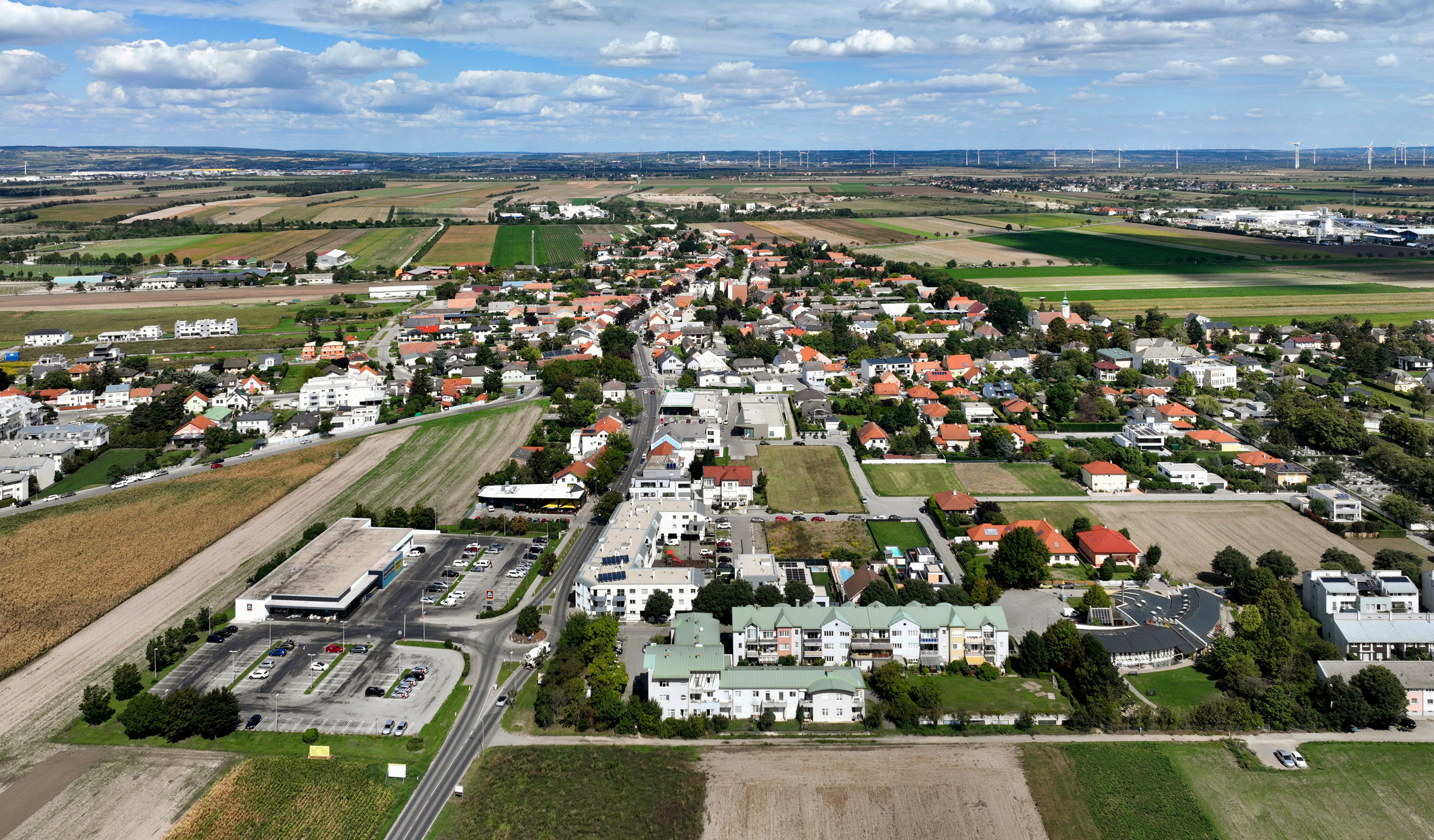
- South view of Gerasdorf bei Wien

- Coat of arms

- Location within Austria Gerasdorf bei Wien (Vienna) Gerasdorf bei Wien (Austria)
- Coordinates: 48°17′42″N 16°28′03″E
- Country: Austria
- State: Lower Austria
- District: Korneuburg

Government
  - Mayor: Dietmar Ruf (FPÖ)

Area
  - Total: 35.26 km^{2} (13.61 sq mi)
- Elevation: 165 m (541 ft)

Population (2018-01-01)
  - Total: 11,155
  - Density: 316.4/km^{2} (819.4/sq mi)
- Time zone: UTC+1 (CET)
  - Summer (DST): UTC+2 (CEST)
- Postal code: 2201
- Area code: +43 2246
- Vehicle registration: KO
- Website: www.gerasdorf-wien.gv.at

Gerasdorf bei Wien is a town in the district of Korneuburg in the Austrian state of Lower Austria. The town has 10,862 inhabitants.

== Geography ==
The city is located in the Weinviertel district of Lower Austria on the northern city boundary of Vienna. The area of the township covers 35.24 square kilometres, about one percent of the area is wooded.

It was the only municipality north of the Danube in Wien-Umgebung District until the district was dissolved in 2016.

== Community classification ==
The municipality comprises the following two localities (population as of 1 January 2016)

- Gerasdorf (9,065)
  - Gerasdorf
  - Kapellerfeld
  - Föhrenhain
  - Oberlisse
- Seyring (1,713)

The municipality consists three cadastral parts:

- Gerasdorf
- Kapellerfeld
- Seyring

== Population ==
Historical population
Year	Pop.	±%
1869	1,330	—
1880	1,364	+2.6%
1890	1,444	+5.9%
1900	1,526	+5.7%
1910	1,733	+13.6%
1923	1,759	+1.5%
1934	2,455	+39.6%
1939	3,485	+42.0%
1951	3,466	−0.5%
1961	3,947	+13.9%
1971	4,728	+19.8%
1981	5,279	+11.7%
1991	6,661	+26.2%
2001	8,231	+23.6%
2011	10,156	+23.4%
2021	11,666	+14.9%

== Politics ==
Since 11 March 2008 Alexander Vojta (SPÖ) is mayor of the city community. Because of the formation of the first SPÖ / ÖVP coalition in the municipality (March 2015) Lukas Mandl (ÖVP) is deputy mayor. The municipal director is Herbert Klenk. In the municipal council, the following mandate distribution takes place in a total of 37 seats following the municipal elections of 25 January 2015:

- Liste SPÖ: 16
- Liste ÖVP: 10
- FPÖ: 7
- GRÜFO (Die Grünen-Forum S1): 2
- Die Unabhängigen Gerasdorf: 2

== History ==
After the "Anschluss" of Austria to the Third Reich the place was integrated into "Groß-Wien" in the autumn of 1938. In 1954 Gerasdorf was one of the 80 Viennese municipalities, which were reorganized to the state of Lower Austria.

In 1972, the municipality of Seyring was integrated into the municipality of Gerasdorf. In May 1992, Gerasdorf became a market town. On 17 December 1998, the Lower Austrian Parliament decided to extend the town of Gerasdorf.

The two settlements of Oberlisse and Kapellerfeld originated in the inter-war period after 1918. The name Kapellerfeld refers to a settlement which was already abandoned in 1258 as "Capellen", which was later abandoned and which was located half a kilometre south of today's settlement.

In September 2015, it was announced that the district of Wien Umgebung would be dissolved by 31 December 2016. In an online citizens' survey (September 2015) a two-thirds majority voted for membership of the Korneuburg district. In this vote Mistelbach and Gänserndorf were the other options.

== Religions ==
In Gerasdorf there are several Roman Catholic parishes (with Oberlisse and Kapellerfeld) and Seyring. From 1953 to 1965 Kurt Knotzinger was chaplain and priest in Gerasdorf. There is also an evangelical church in Gerasdorf and in Kapellerfeld.

== Economy and Infrastructure ==
- 214 non-agricultural workplaces (2001), smaller industrial and commercial enterprises
- 47 agricultural and forestry holdings (1999)
- 3.779 employed at the place of residence (2001)
- 47.29 percent employment rate (2001)

The most important economic factor is undoubtedly the shopping centre "G3 Shopping Ressort Gerasdorf", located in Gerasdorf municipality. It is the fifth largest shopping centre in Austria. The name G3 designates the three building complexes consisting of the shopping centre, the specialist market centre and the adjoining Hornbach building, which has existed since 1997.

== Traffic overview ==
In Gerasdorf there is an important railway junction on the part of the route from Vienna-Stadlau to Wolkersdorf / Mistelbach / Laa an der Thaya. On the other hand, the route runs from Vienna-Floridsdorf to Gänserndorf / Hohenau / Breclav through Gerasdorf. In the municipal area of Gerasdorf near Vienna there is not only the station Gerasdorf (core zone border Vienna, route S2), but also the train stops Kapellerfeld and Seyring.

== Sport ==
Gerasdorf used to be home to a well-known soccer club in Austria. The SV Gerasdorf, shortnamed SVG, was an Austrian football club, playing for the Viennese football association. At its most successful time, the club played in the Austrian second division from 1994 to 1998, before joining VSE St. Pölten in FC Lower Austria, which ended in bankruptcy in 2000. In 1998 a new club called SV Gerasdorf/Stammersdorf was founded, which now plays in Gerasdorf.

Greatest successes in the history of SV Gerasdorf:

- 4 x Second division participation: 1995-1998 (2nd place 1996)
- 1 x Wiener Landesmeister: 1994
- 1 x Wiener Cupsieger: 1993
