= Fischamend =

- Municipality
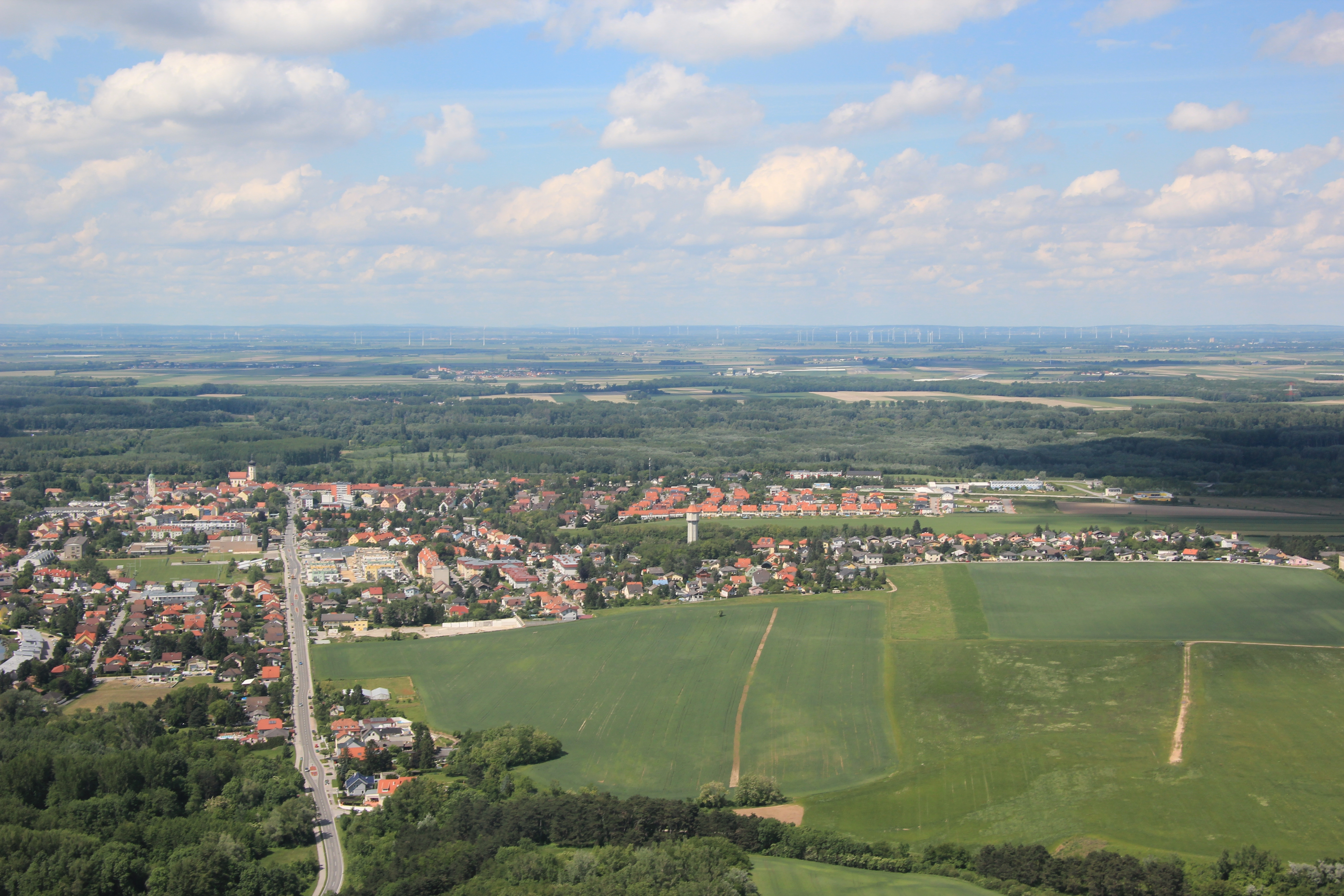
- Aerial view of Fischamend from the South

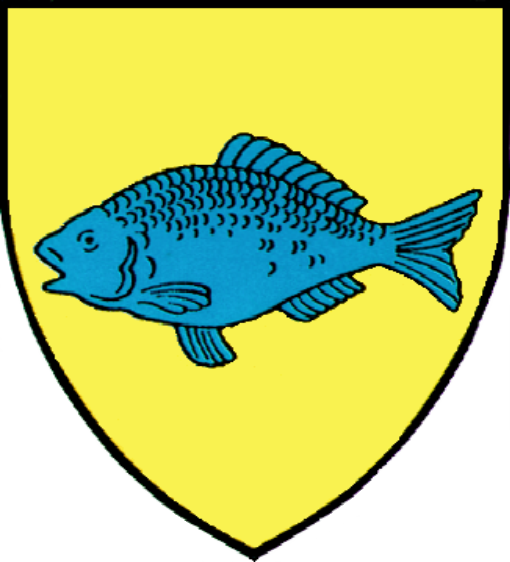
- Coat of arms

- Location within Austria
- Coordinates: 48°06′56″N 16°36′46″E
- Country: Austria
- State: Lower Austria
- District: Bruck an der Leitha

Government
  - Mayor: Thomas Ram (ÖVP)

Area
  - Total: 24.91 km^{2} (9.62 sq mi)
- Elevation: 156 m (512 ft)

Population (2018-01-01)
  - Total: 5,583
  - Density: 224.1/km^{2} (580.5/sq mi)
- Time zone: UTC+1 (CET)
  - Summer (DST): UTC+2 (CEST)
- Area code: 02232
- Vehicle registration: BL
- Website: www.fischamend.gv.at

Fischamend (German pronunciation: [ˌfɪʃaˈmɛnt]) is a town in the district of Bruck an der Leitha in the Austrian state of Lower Austria. It belonged to Wien-Umgebung District which was dissolved in 2016.

== Population ==
Historical population
Year	Pop.	±%
1869	1,919	—
1880	2,794	+45.6%
1890	3,608	+29.1%
1900	2,656	−26.4%
1910	3,364	+26.7%
1923	3,601	+7.0%
1934	3,769	+4.7%
1939	3,585	−4.9%
1951	3,679	+2.6%
1961	4,151	+12.8%
1981	4,239	+2.1%
1991	4,417	+4.2%
2001	4,419	+0.0%
2011	4,817	+9.0%
2021	5,578	+15.8%

== Geography ==
Fischamend lies in the "Industrial Quarter" in Lower Austria.
