= Schwadorf =

Market town in Austria

- Municipality
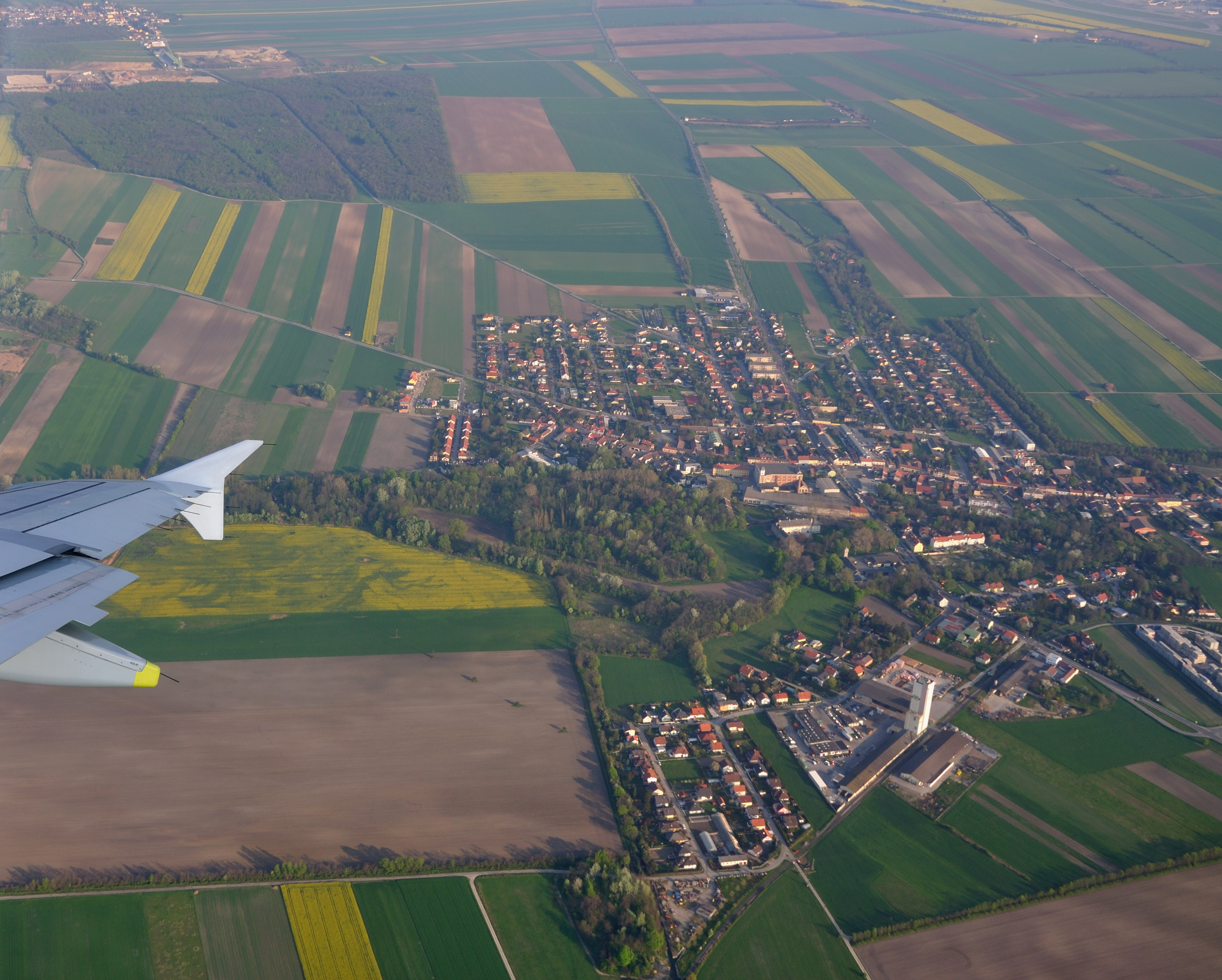
- Aerial view of Schwadorf

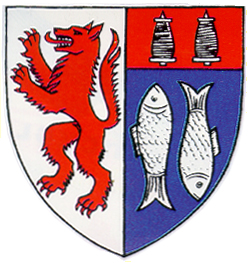
- Coat of arms

- Location within Austria
- Coordinates: 48°04′00″N 16°35′00″E
- Country: Austria
- State: Lower Austria
- District: Bruck an der Leitha

Government
  - Mayor: Jürgen Maschl (SPÖ)

Area
  - Total: 11.38 km^{2} (4.39 sq mi)
- Elevation: 163 m (535 ft)

Population (2018-01-01)
  - Total: 2,180
  - Density: 192/km^{2} (496/sq mi)
- Time zone: UTC+1 (CET)
  - Summer (DST): UTC+2 (CEST)
- Postal code: 2432
- Area code: 02230
- Vehicle registration: BL
- Website: www.schwadorf.gv.at

Schwadorf is an Austrian market town in the Bruck an der Leitha district. It lies on the banks of the River Fischa, fifteen miles (24 km) southeast of Vienna.

== Geography ==
The town is located in a seismic area above a fault line. The "Schwadorf Dome" has been subject to minor earthquakes on occasion, the last one of significance occurring on 8 October 1927.

== Population ==
Historical population
Year	Pop.	±%
1971	1,500	—
1981	1,488	−0.8%
1991	1,692	+13.7%
2001	1,768	+4.5%

== Sport ==
The town's football team, SK Schwadorf, was formed on 31 May 1936 (as ASK Schwadorf). They hosted English giants Arsenal in a friendly in July 2006.

== Recent times ==
The town's former district Wien-Umgebung was dissolved at the end of 2016.

== Notable people ==
- Eduard Ritter von Josch (b. Schwadorf 1799), botanist, president of the regional court in Laibach.
