= Gablitz =

- Municipality
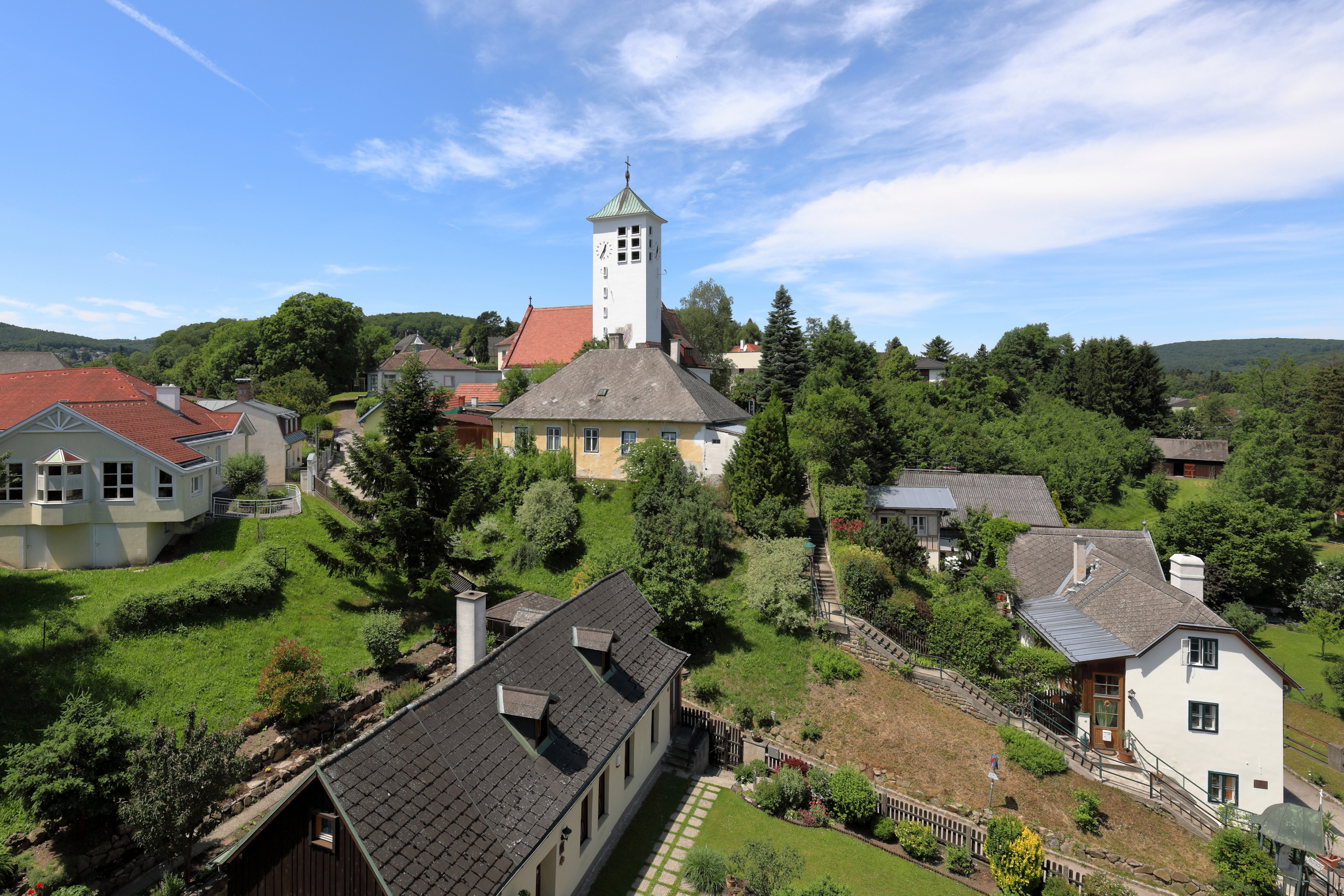
- View of Gablitz

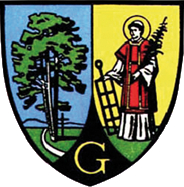
- Coat of arms

- Location within Austria
- Coordinates: 48°13′33″N 16°08′48″E
- Country: Austria
- State: Lower Austria
- District: Sankt Pölten-Land

Government
  - Mayor: Michael Cech (ÖVP)

Area
  - Total: 18.17 km^{2} (7.02 sq mi)
- Elevation: 284 m (932 ft)

Population (2018-01-01)
  - Total: 4,968
  - Density: 273.4/km^{2} (708.1/sq mi)
- Time zone: UTC+1 (CET)
  - Summer (DST): UTC+2 (CEST)
- Postal code: 3003
- Area code: 02231
- Vehicle registration: BL
- Website: www.gablitz.gv.at

Gablitz is a municipality in the district of St. Pölten-Land in the Austrian state of Lower Austria.

It belonged to Wien-Umgebung which was dissolved in 2016.

== Population ==
Historical population
Year	Pop.	±%
1869	753	—
1880	903	+19.9%
1890	1,084	+20.0%
1900	1,315	+21.3%
1910	1,882	+43.1%
1923	1,795	−4.6%
1934	1,963	+9.4%
1951	2,061	+5.0%
1961	2,057	−0.2%
1971	2,556	+24.3%
1981	2,962	+15.9%
1991	3,840	+29.6%
2001	4,408	+14.8%
