= SC Mauerbach =

USC Wiesbauer Mauerbach
- Full name: USC Wiesbauer Mauerbach
- Founded: 1951
- Ground: Waldstadion
- Capacity: 500
- Chairman: Gerald Schober
- Manager: Juanito Palla
- League: 1. Klasse NordWest

USC Wiesbauer Mauerbach is an association football team from Mauerbach, Austria. The club was founded in 1951, and plays in the 1.Klasse NordWest division, in Austria's lower leagues. Mauerbach's current manager is Juanito Palla, a former defender who played for Mauerbach and other lower Austrian teams.

== Current squad ==
Squad correct as of 07 Aug. 2015.

Squad Number	Country	Player name
1	(Austria)	Berhard Neuhauser
2	(Austria)	Lukas Hrovat
3	(Austria)	Leon Engel
4	(Austria)	Paul Tenko
5	(Italy)	Claudio Feis
6	(Turkey)	Inan Türkmen
7	(Slovenia)	Simon Lackner
8	(Austria)	Clemens Müller-Hörnstein
9	(Serbia)	Dragisa Marisavjevic
10	(Austria)	Maximilian Messerklinger
11	(Austria)	Martin Zwicker
12	(Austria)	Herbert Neuhauser
13	(Austria)	Manuel Becvar
14	(Austria)	Dominic Palla
15	(Austria)	Paul Möslinger
16	(Austria)	Valentin Payerl
17	(Austria)	Raphael Wieselmayer
18	(Austria)	Greul Felix
19	(Austria)	Julian Berthold
20	(Austria)	Peter Bannauer
21	(Croatia)	Boza Bjelic
