= Wolfsgraben =

- Municipality
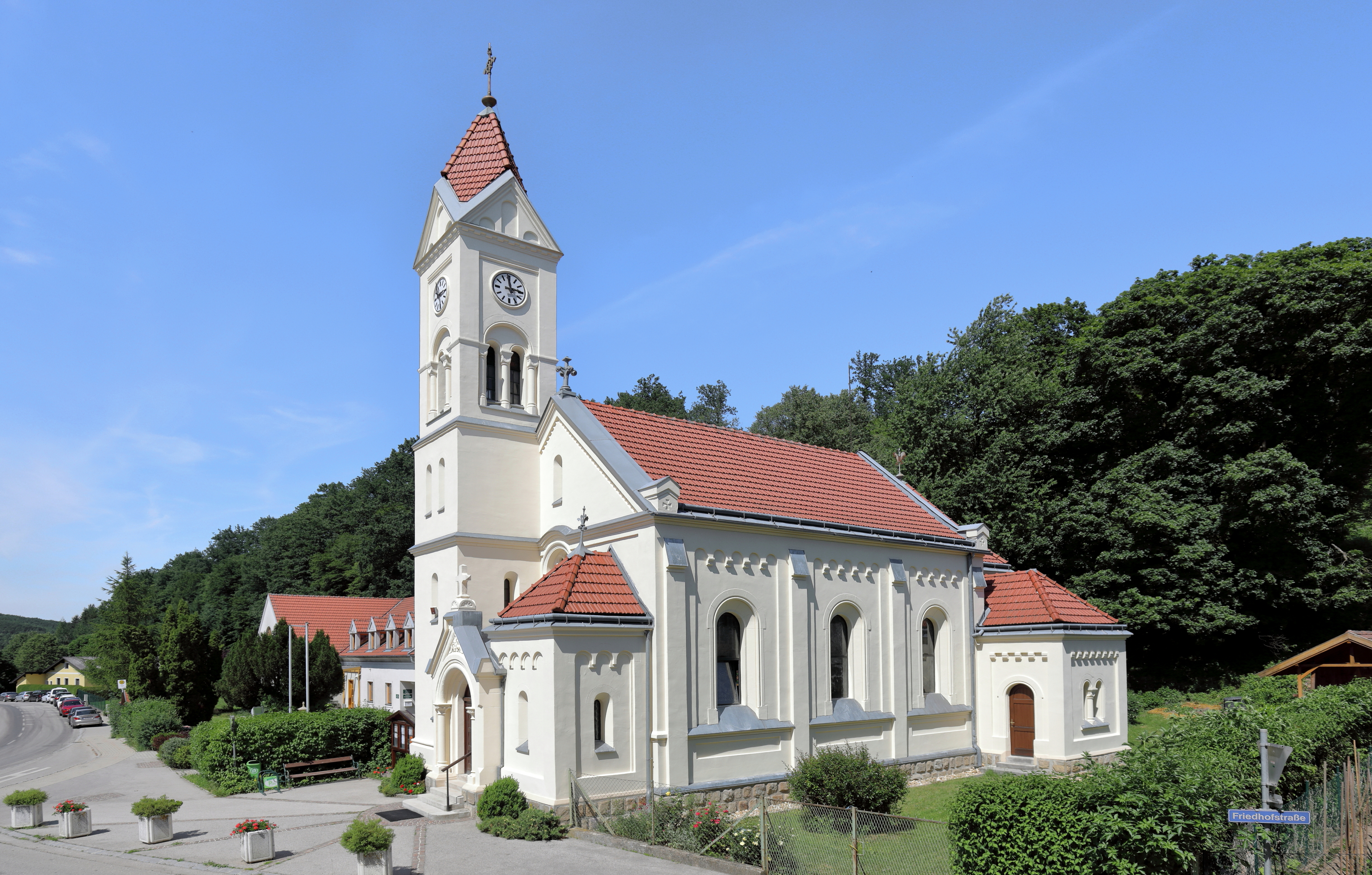
- Church of the Sacred Heart

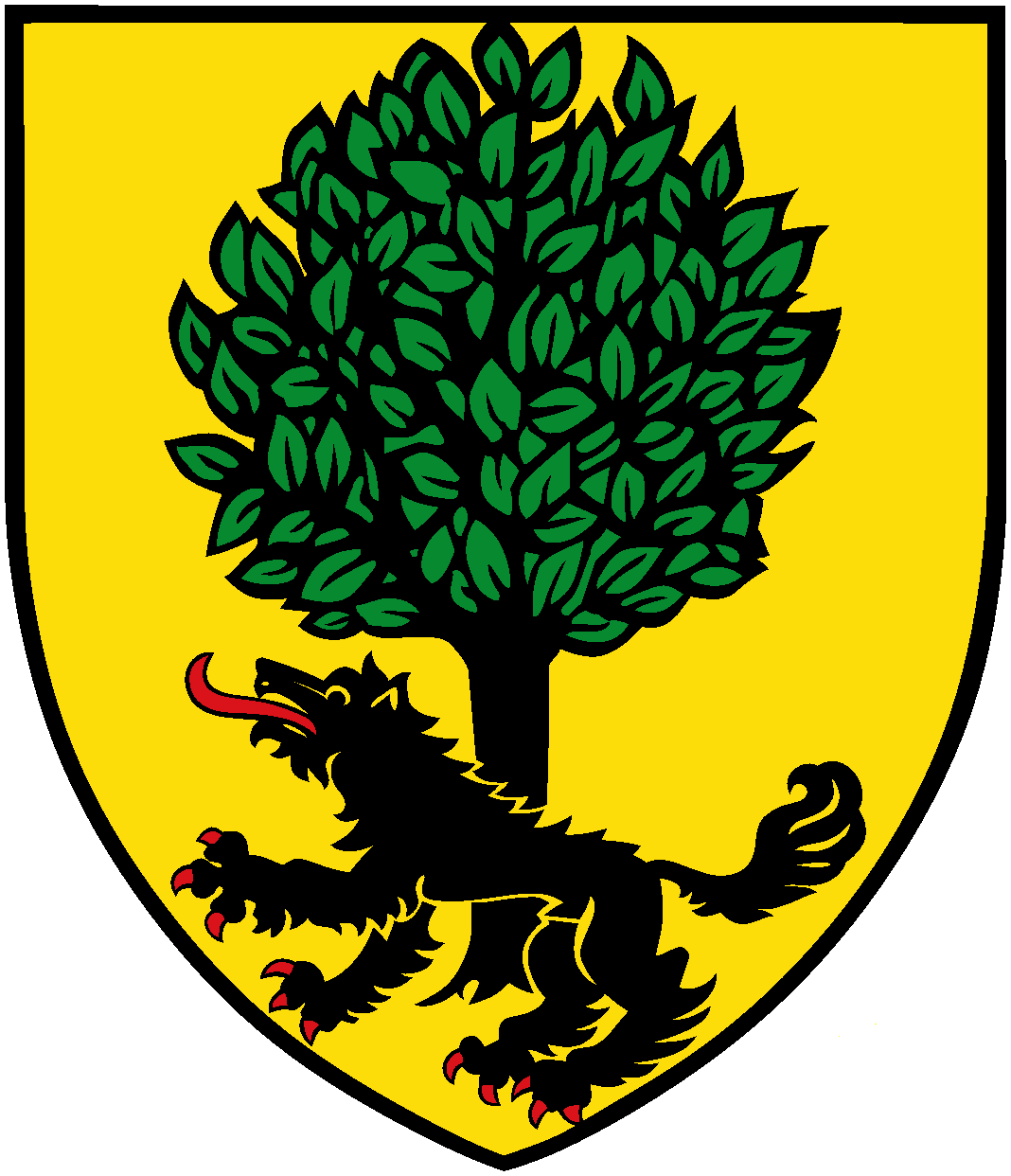
- Coat of arms

- Location within Austria
- Coordinates: 48°09′31″N 16°07′05″E
- Country: Austria
- State: Lower Austria
- District: Sankt Pölten-Land

Government
  - Mayor: Claudia Bock (ÖVP)

Area
  - Total: 17.34 km^{2} (6.70 sq mi)
- Elevation: 323 m (1,060 ft)

Population (2018-01-01)
  - Total: 1,700
  - Density: 98/km^{2} (250/sq mi)
- Time zone: UTC+1 (CET)
  - Summer (DST): UTC+2 (CEST)
- Postal code: 3012
- Area code: 02233
- Vehicle registration: PL
- Website: https://www.gemeinde-wolfsgraben.at/

Wolfsgraben is a municipality in the district of St. Pölten in the Austrian state of Lower Austria.

== Population ==
Historical population
Year	Pop.	±%
1971	594	—
1981	743	+25.1%
1991	1,089	+46.6%
2001	1,416	+30.0%
