= St. Pölten District =

Coordinates: 48.183°N 15.667°E

St. Pölten District Bezirk St. Pölten
- District
- Country: Austria
- State: Lower Austria
- Number of municipalities: 45
- Administrative seat: St. Pölten

Government
  - District Governor: Josef Kronister

Area
  - Total: 1,288.0 km^{2} (497.3 sq mi)

Population (1 January 2016)
  - Total: 128,999
  - Density: 100.15/km^{2} (259.40/sq mi)
- Time zone: UTC+01:00 (CET)
  - Summer (DST): UTC+02:00 (CEST)
- Vehicle registration: PL
- NUTS code: AT123

Bezirk St. Pölten is a district of the Austrian state of Lower Austria. It completely surrounds the city of St. Pölten, which exists as a separate entity and borders Vienna to the west. The former Markersdorf Airfield was located in Markersdorf-Haindorf.

== Changes ==
At the end of 2016 the district absorbed Gablitz, Mauerbach, Pressbaum, Purkersdorf, Tullnerbach and Wolfsgraben from the defunct Wien-Umgebung District.
