= Danube-Auen National Park =

National park of Austria

Donau-Auen National Park
- IUCN category II (national park)
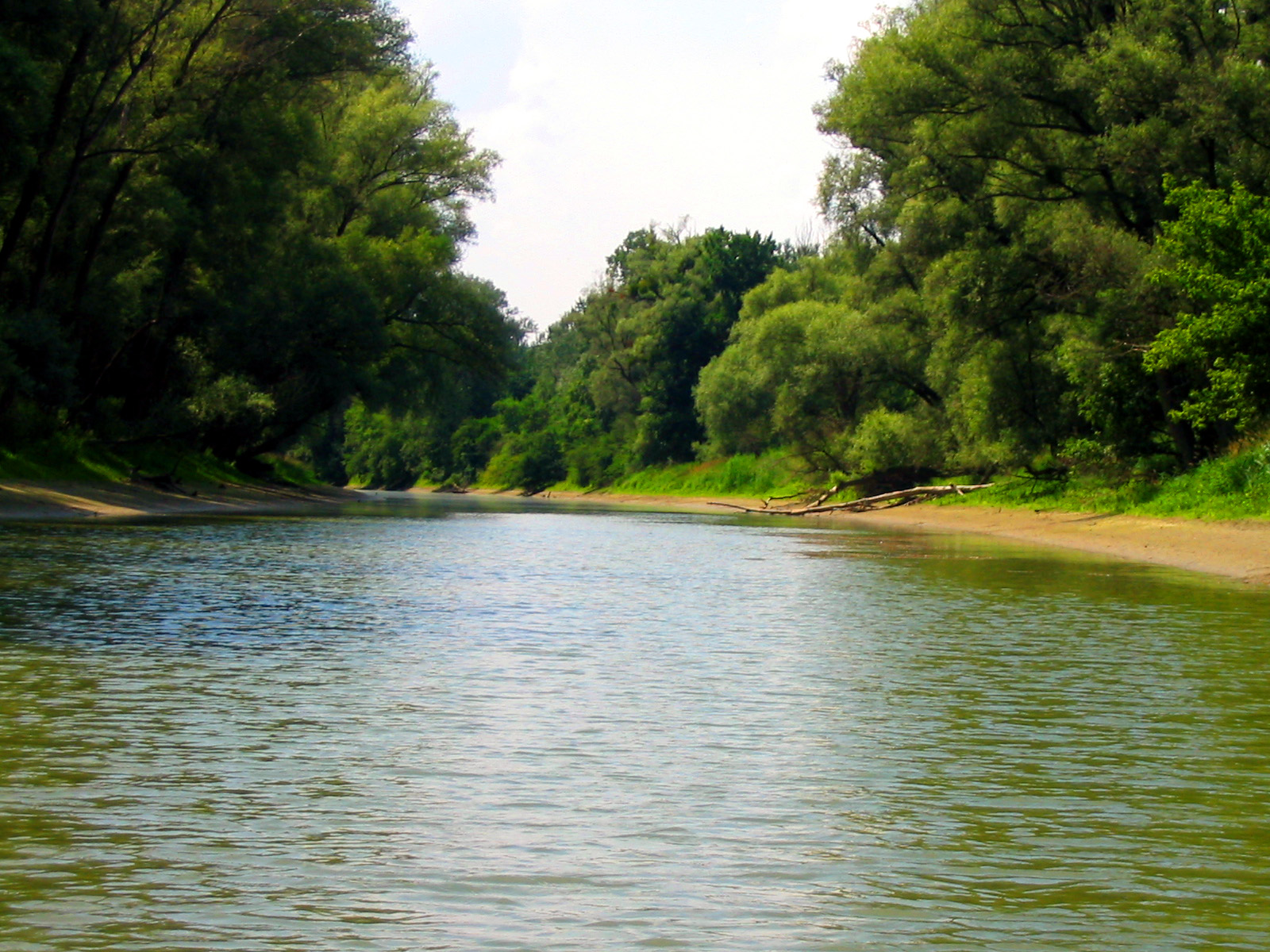
- Donau-Auen near Hainburg

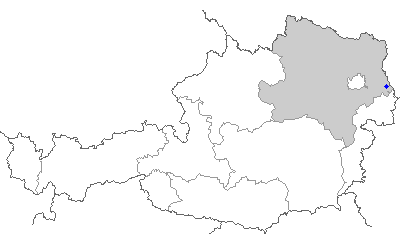
- Location: Vienna and Lower Austria
- Nearest city: Vienna
- Coordinates: 48°8′N 16°55′E
- Area: 93 km^{2} (36 sq mi)
- Established: October 27, 1996

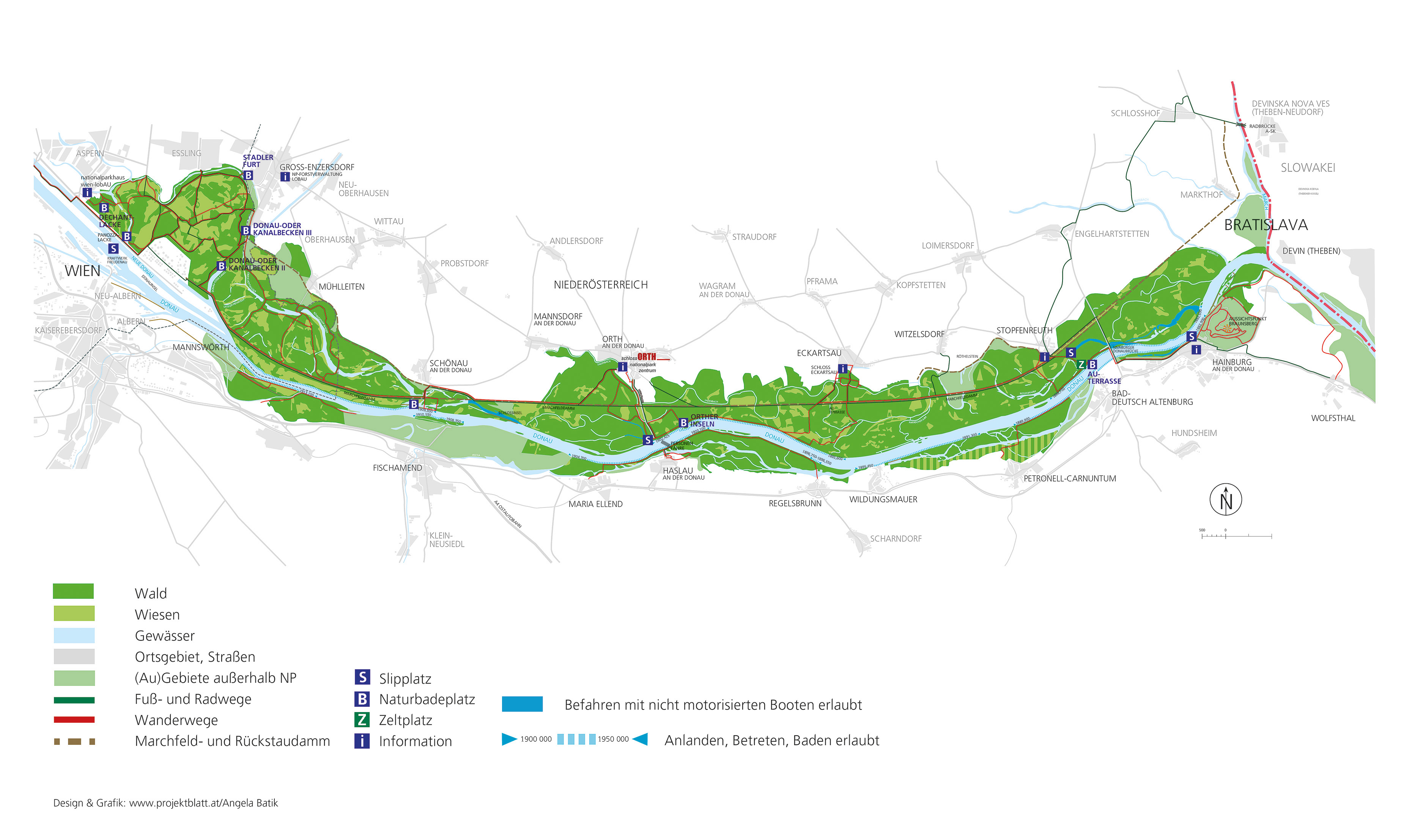
Map of Donau-Auen National Park

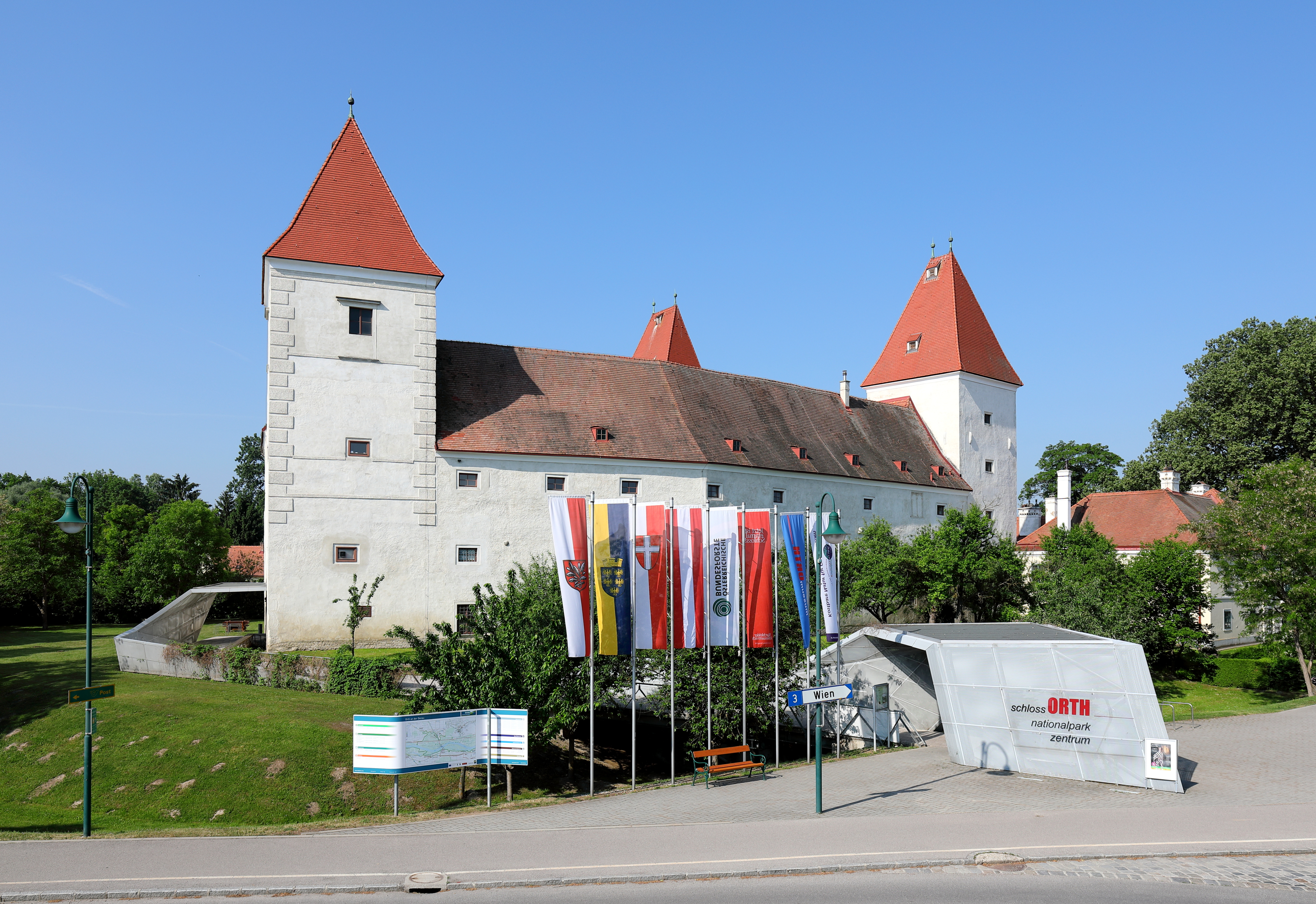
Schloss Orth: visitor centre and administration centre

Donau-Auen National Park (German: Nationalpark Donau-Auen) covers 93 square kilometres in Vienna and Lower Austria and is one of the largest remaining floodplains of the Danube in Middle Europe.

The German word Aue (variant Au) means "river island, wetland, floodplain, riparian woodland", i.e. a cultivated landscape in a riparian zone. The words Aue and Au occur in a large number of German place names—including Donau, the German word for the Danube River—and refer to forests, meadows, and wetlands in river and stream lowlands and floodplains. The Danube-Auen National Park protects a large area of lowland forests, meadows, wetlands, and other riparian habitat along the Danube just downstream of Vienna.

The Park was designated an IUCN category II national park and spans the areas of Vienna (Lobau), Groß-Enzersdorf, Orth an der Donau, Eckartsau, Engelhartstetten, Hainburg, Bad Deutsch-Altenburg, Petronell-Carnuntum, Regelsbrunn, Haslau-Maria Ellend, Fischamend and Schwechat.

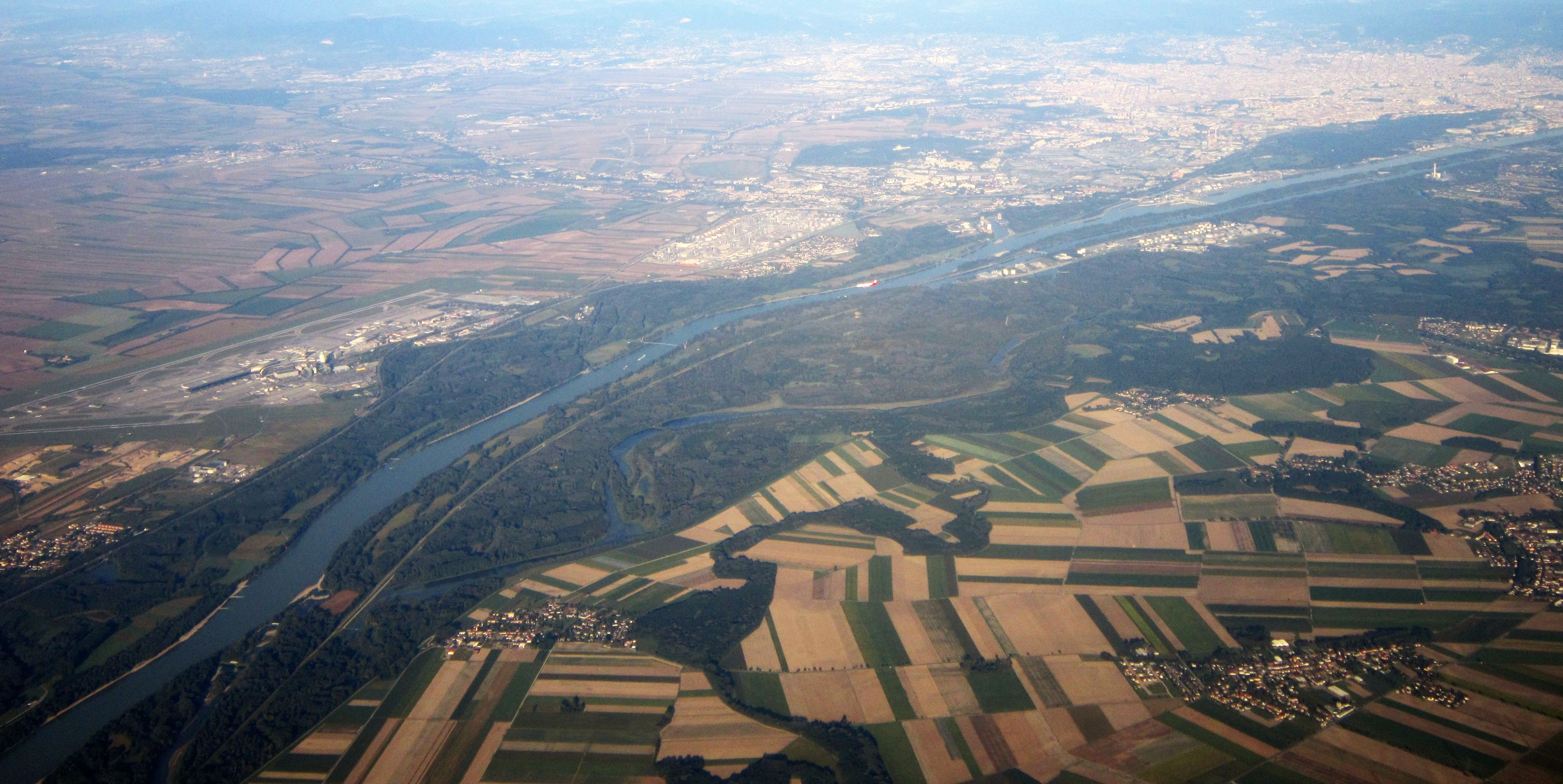
The Park near Lobau and Groß-Enzersdorf, with Vienna International Airport on the left

== Creation of the National Park ==
Until the 19th century the Danube was an untamed river. In the 19th century, extensive engineering began to alter the natural balance of the river landscape dramatically. Many side-channels were dammed so that they now carry water from the Danube only at flood stages. Ever more intrusive engineering interventions were accompanied by decades of heavy forestry use in many parts of lowland forests. In the 1950s, development began of a nearly unbroken chain of hydroelectric power plants and associated dams on the Austrian section of the Danube River.

In 1984, the planned construction of the Hainburg hydroelectric power plant, just downstream from Vienna, threatened to destroy one of the two remaining free-flowing sections of the Danube in Austria and its riparian forests (the other remaining free-flowing section in Austria is upstream, near Wachau). An outcry by environmental and nature protection groups caused nationwide protests against the project. The operator of the power plant project disregarded the protests and began work to clear the area. Protests stepped up, eventually leading to the occupation of the Hainburg wetlands by thousands of people from all ages and professions (the so-called "Hainburg Movement"). After police tried several times to clear protestors from the area, in December 1984 the Federal Government declared a pause for reflection. In January 1985 the Austrian Supreme Court forbade further deforestation. In March 1985, the so-called Konrad Lorenz-Volksbegehren (petition), signed by 353,906 people, demanded the prohibition of large power plants such as Hainburg and the establishment of a national park in the area of Hainburg. On 1 July 1986, the Administrative Court released a decision cancelling the water rights of the planned power plant.

Extensive scientific studies were then made of the area, with surprising discoveries. More species of fish were observed than what was known at the time of the planning of the power plant.

The most important result of these studies was that the Danube lowlands area (Donau-Auen) east of Vienna was determined to be worthy of becoming a national park. It was also determined that creating a power plant in the area would not be compatible with national park status for the region. On October 27, 1996, a State Treaty between the Republic of Austria and the federal states of Vienna and Lower Austria was signed. With that treaty, Donau-Auen National Park was officially established.

== Flora and fauna ==
In the National Park area there are more than 700 species of higher plants, more than 30 mammals, 100 species of breeding birds, 8 reptiles, 13 amphibian species, and around 50 species of fish. Among the most characteristic inhabitants of the wetlands of the National Park are the Danube crested newt, European pond turtle, European mudminnow, white-tailed eagle, Eurasian kingfisher, and Eurasian beaver.

With the variety of insects living on both land and water, and other invertebrates, the total number of species in Donau-Auen National Park is estimated to be at least 5,000.

== The River ==
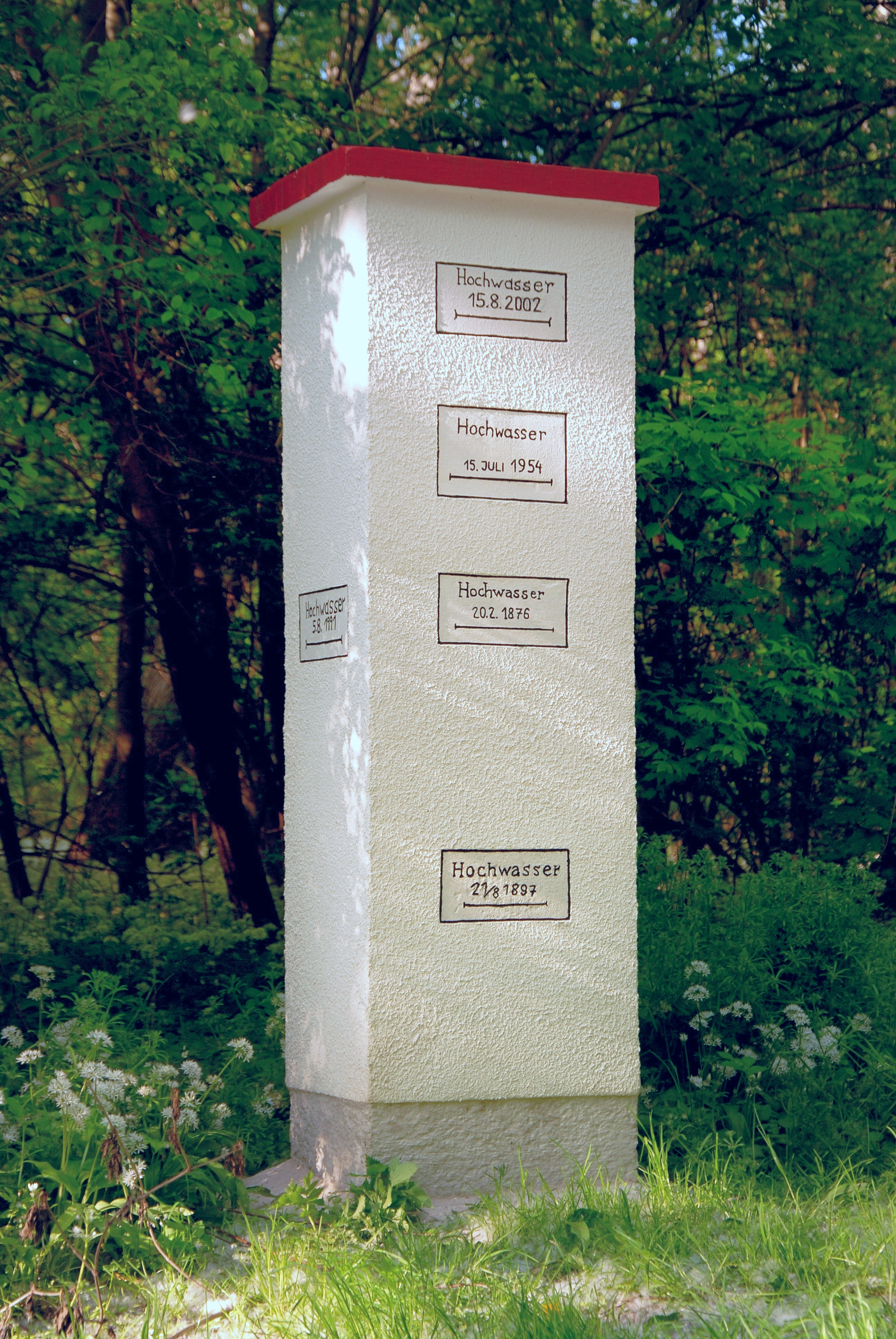
Monument with high water marks near Stopfenreuth – highest: August 15th, 2002

The main channel of the Danube was separated from its side channels by the flood control measures that were constructed around the year 1900. The outcome was a higher current velocity in the main channel, with a resulting deepening of the river bed, while in the side channels—which no longer had current flowing through them—sand and loam deposits were no longer removed by the current. In a natural riparian ecosystem woody plants and deadwood have a strong impact on the natural flow dynamics, by stabilizing riverbanks, by reducing erosion, and by creating areas of reducing or increased flow rates, and thus affecting in which areas sediments are deposited or removed. Large tree trunks and accumulations of smaller flotsam cause the water to stagnate and the speed of the current to drop, leading to increased sedimentation.

To counteract the effects of the flood control measures, beginning in 2002 individual side channels were tied in with the main channel again—at least at high water times—via Gewässervernetzungen ("water crossings"), which lower or remove the levees protecting those channels.

In a 2006 pilot project created with the support of the LIFE+ Program of the European Union and the Austrian riverways agency via donau, about three kilometers of the complete flood works were removed across the river from Hainburg, so that the river once again could spread into the floodplain areas. In a similar project near Witzelsdorf, about one kilometer of the levees were removed. After the completion of the pilot projects in Hainburg and Witzelsdorf, future plans for this river engineering project are for removal of 50% of the levees and flood control works between Vienna and the eastern border of Austria.

Aside from a revitalization of the Au (riparian zone), the project promises to mediate the effects of floods on the river and to stabilize the riverbed to the benefit of both river ecology and navigation.

== Photo gallery ==
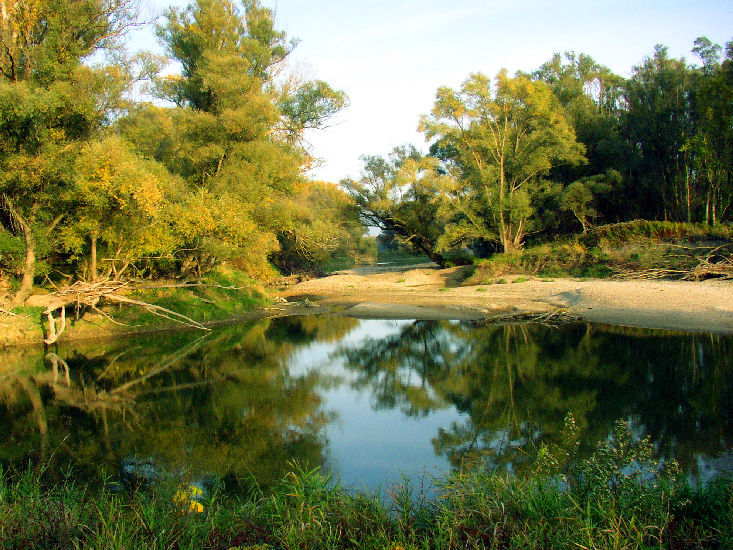
An old channel of the Donau-Auen near Schönau

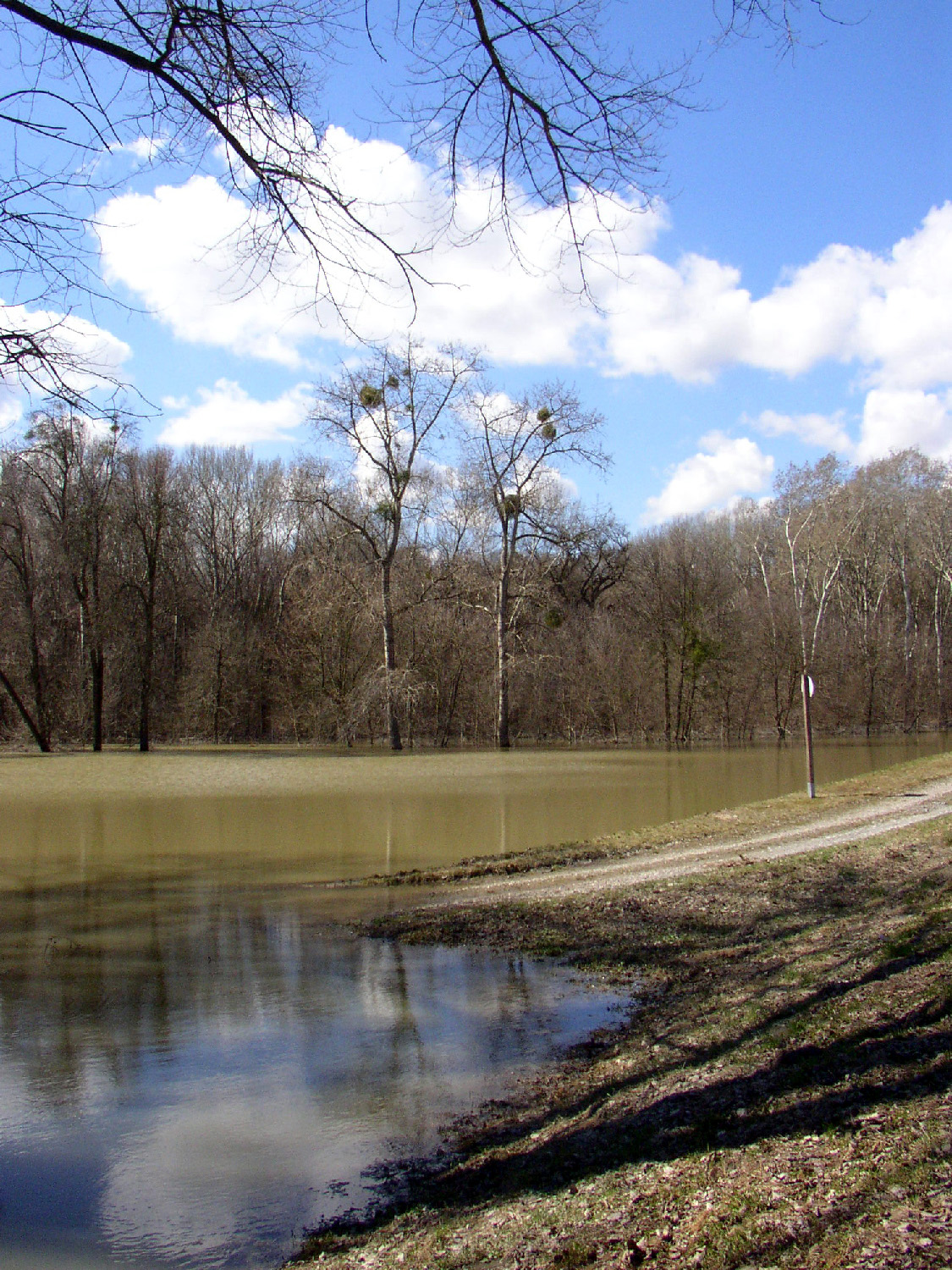
Spring flood waters between Schönau and Orth an der Donau

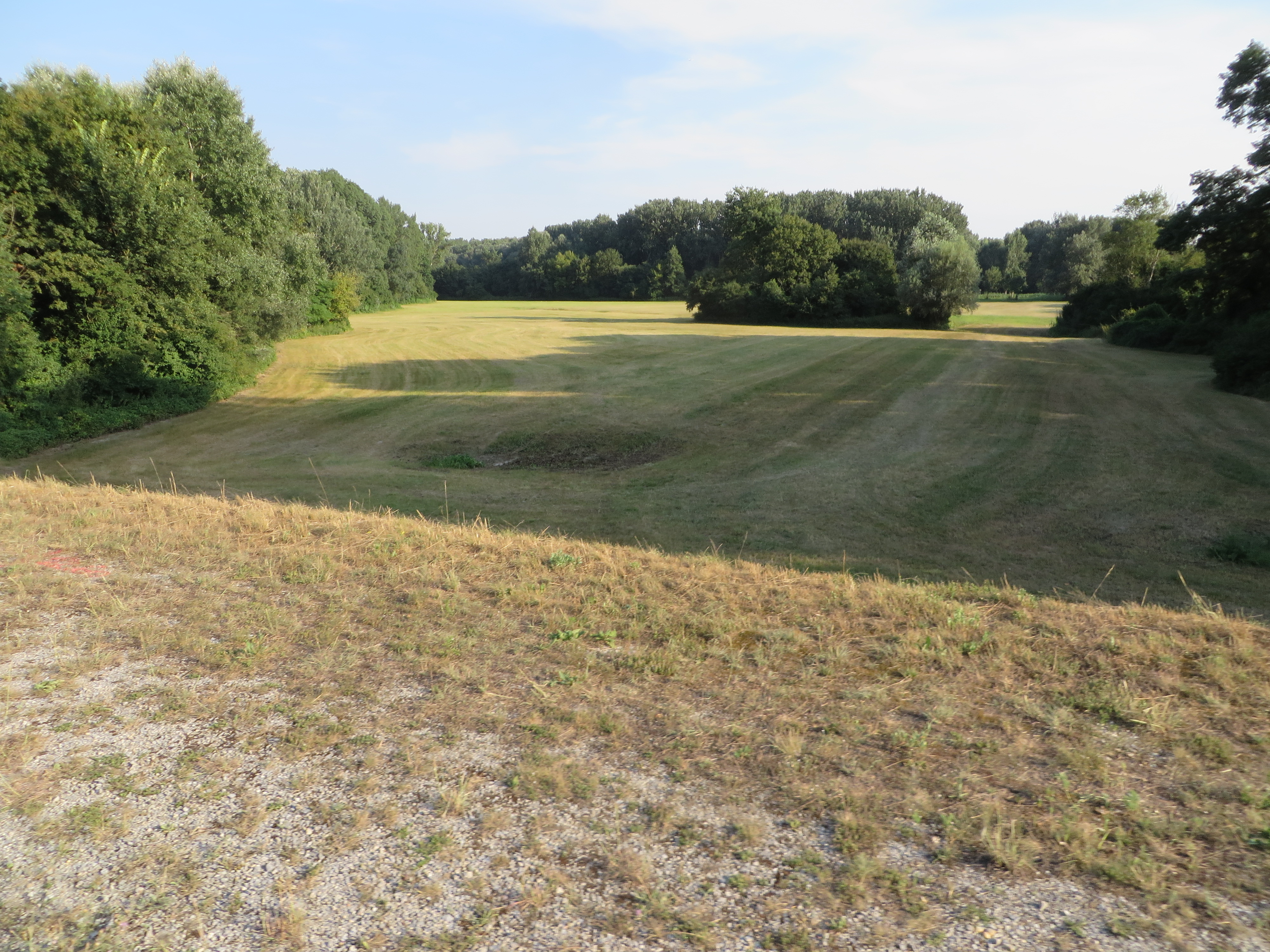
Levee, field, and woodland in the Donau-Auen

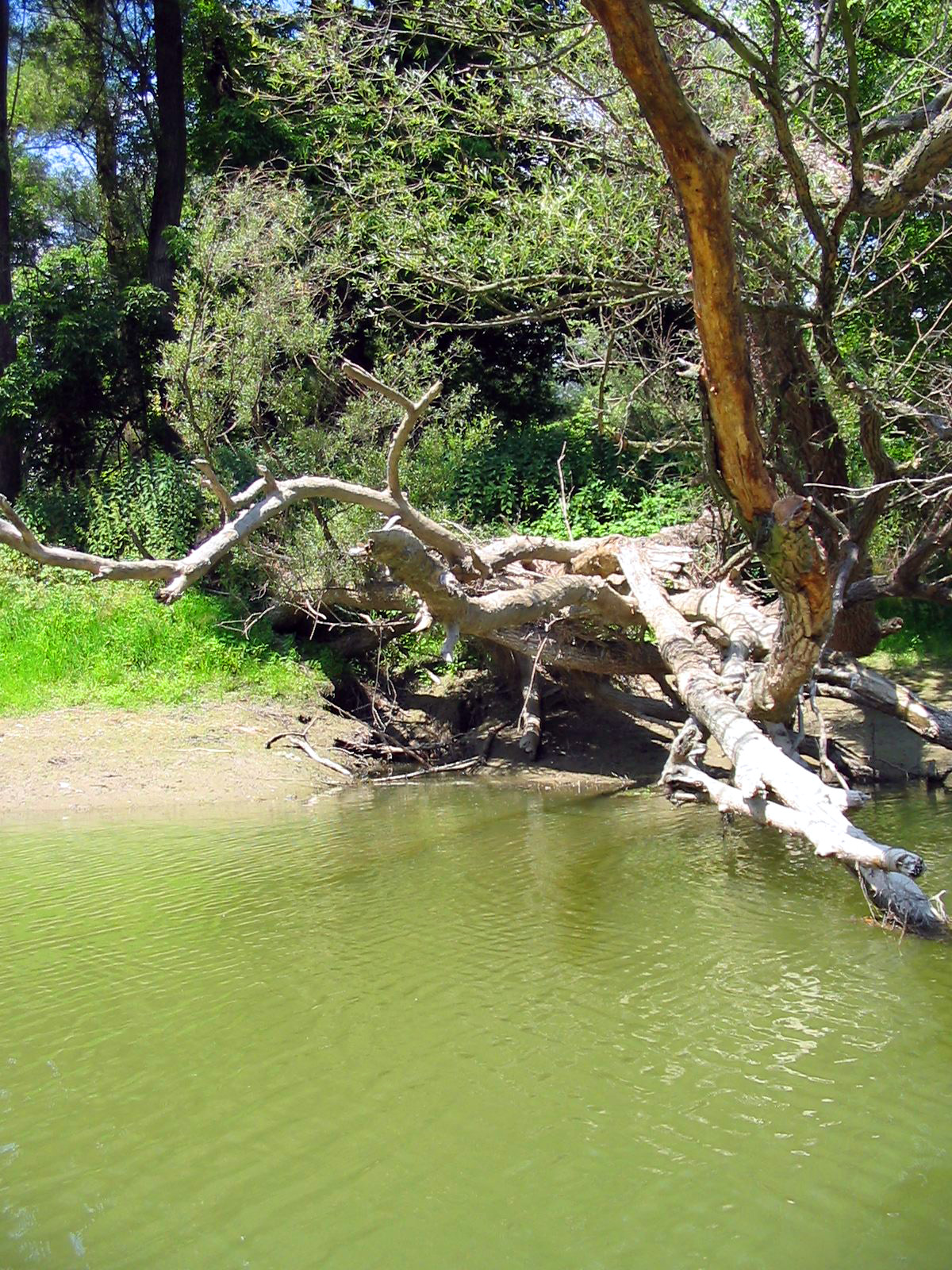
Beaver lodge

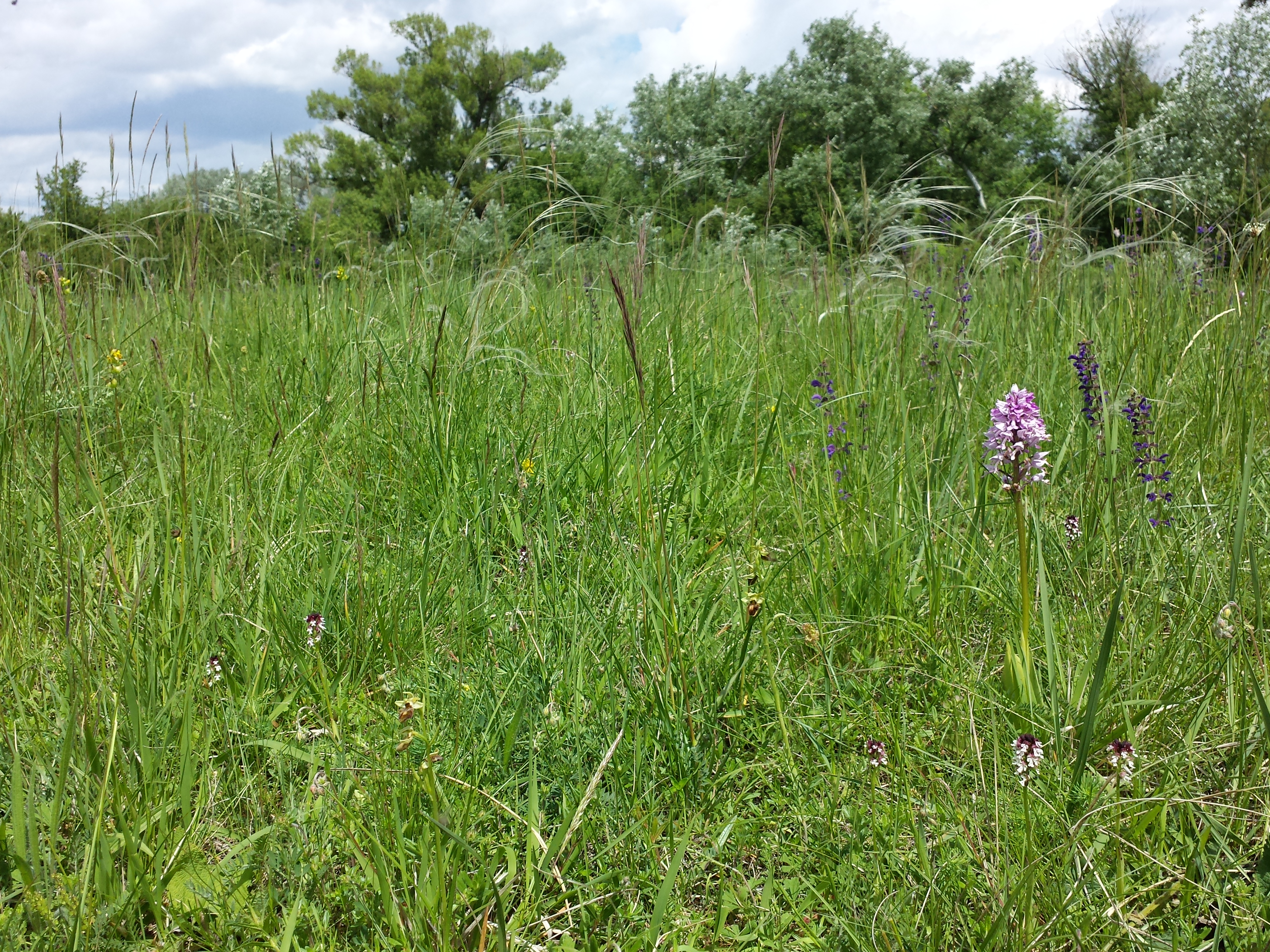
Hotspot microclimate in the Lobau with European feather grass and several Orchid varieties.

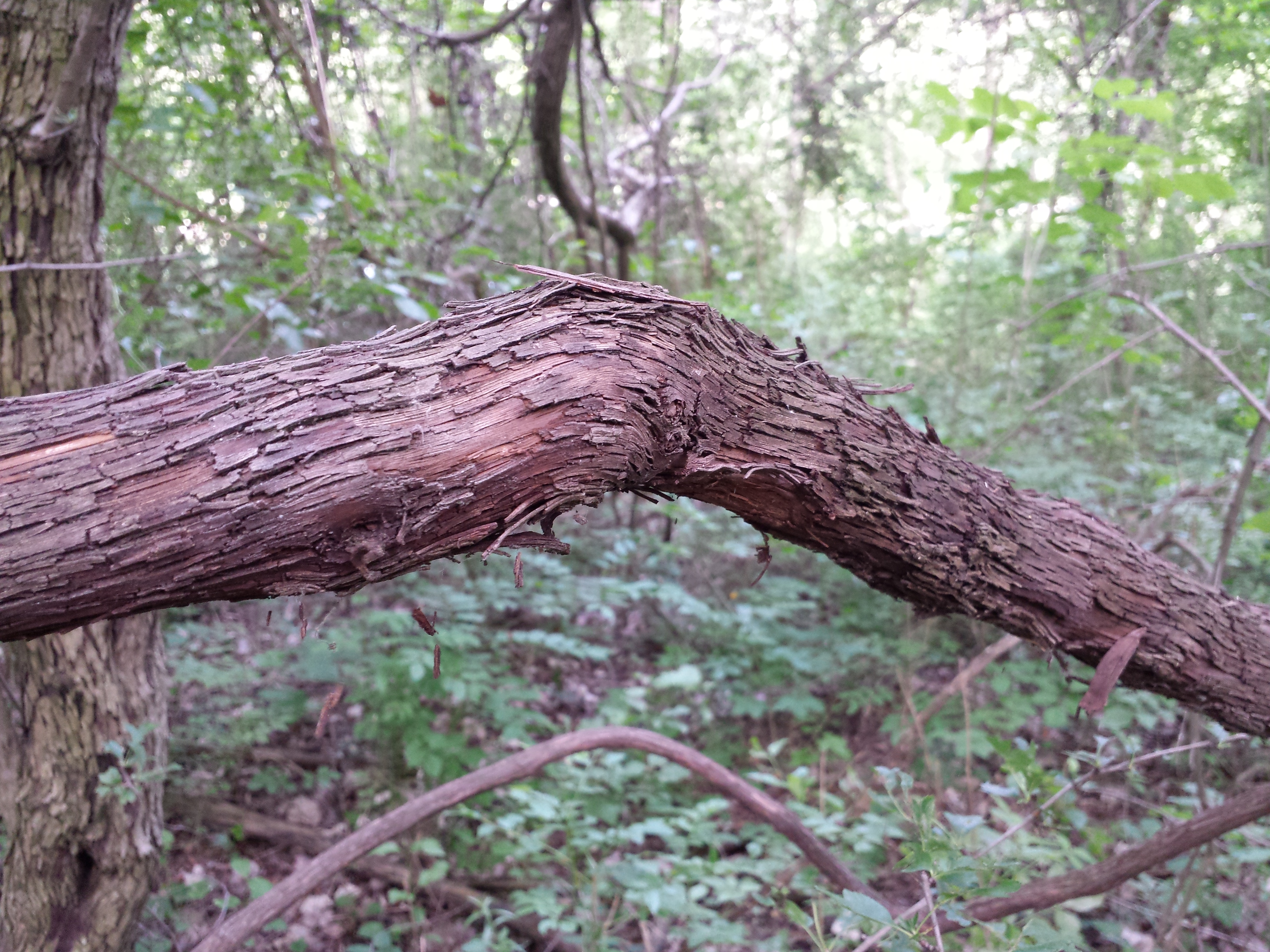
The Wild-Weinrebe (wild grapevine) appears very seldom in the Austrian Donauauen and is extremely endangered.

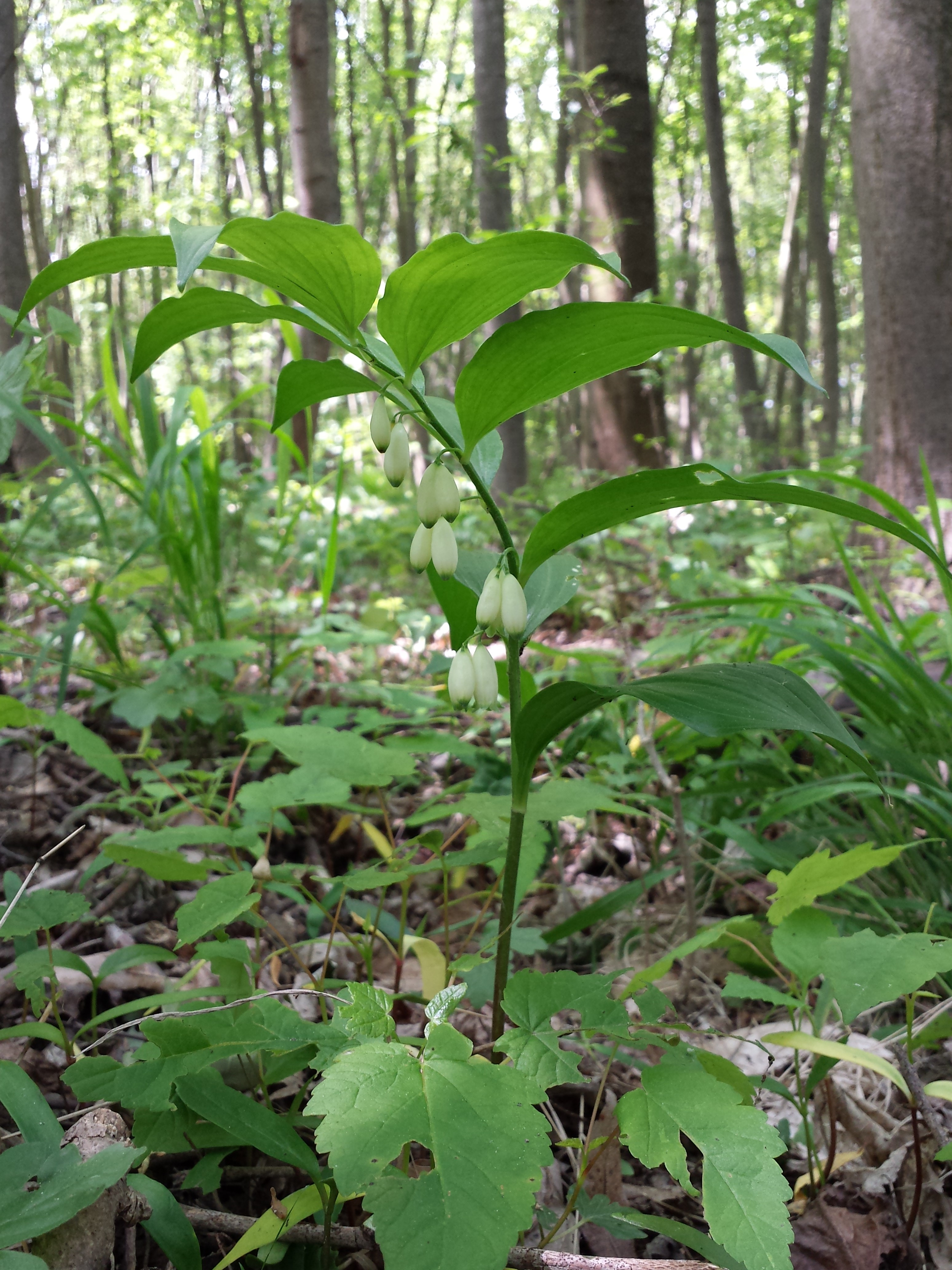
The Broad-leafed Solomon's seal is a typical variety in the Harten Au.

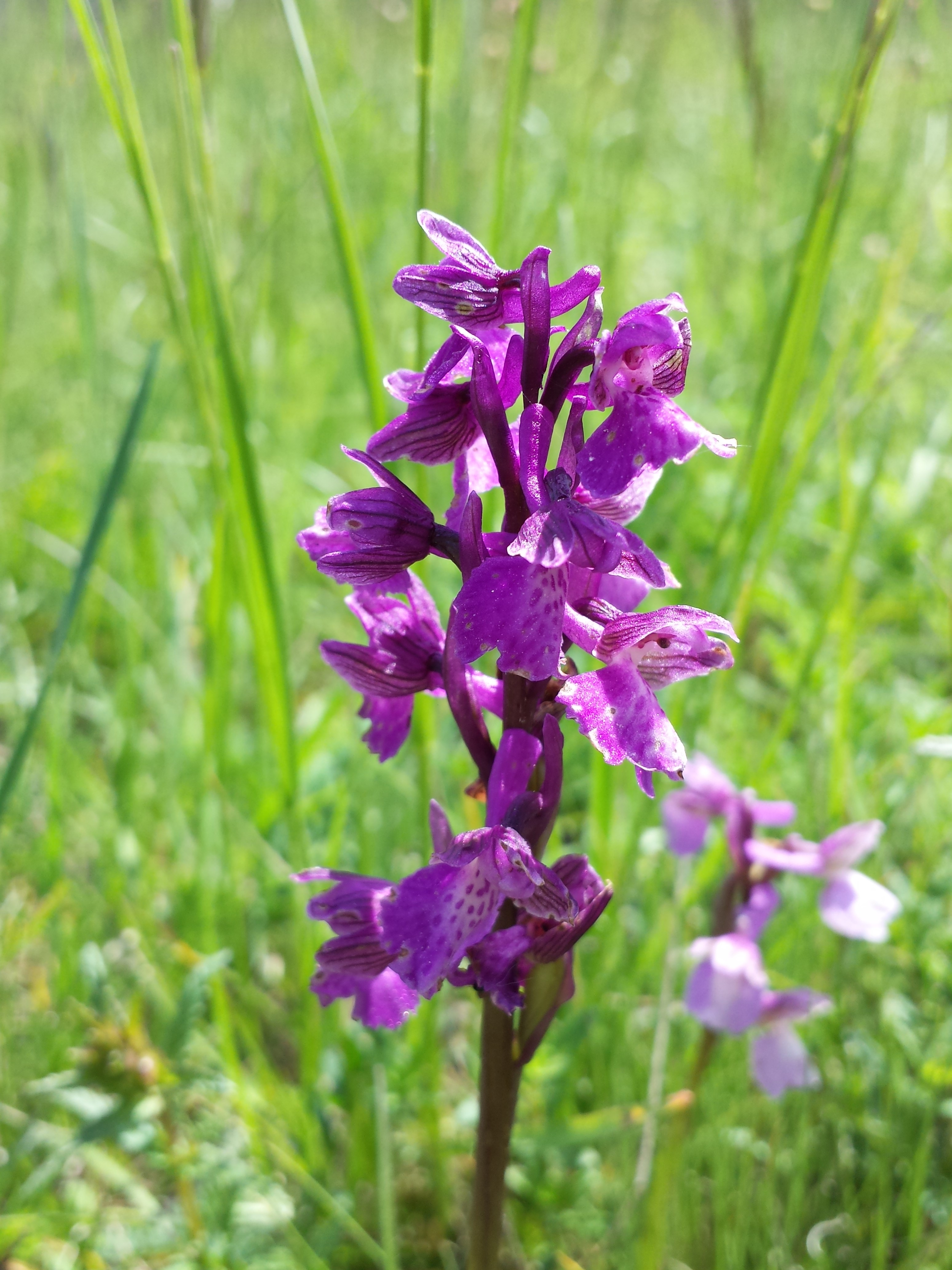
Orchids like green-winged orchid that thrive in hotspot microclimates are endangered in Austria.

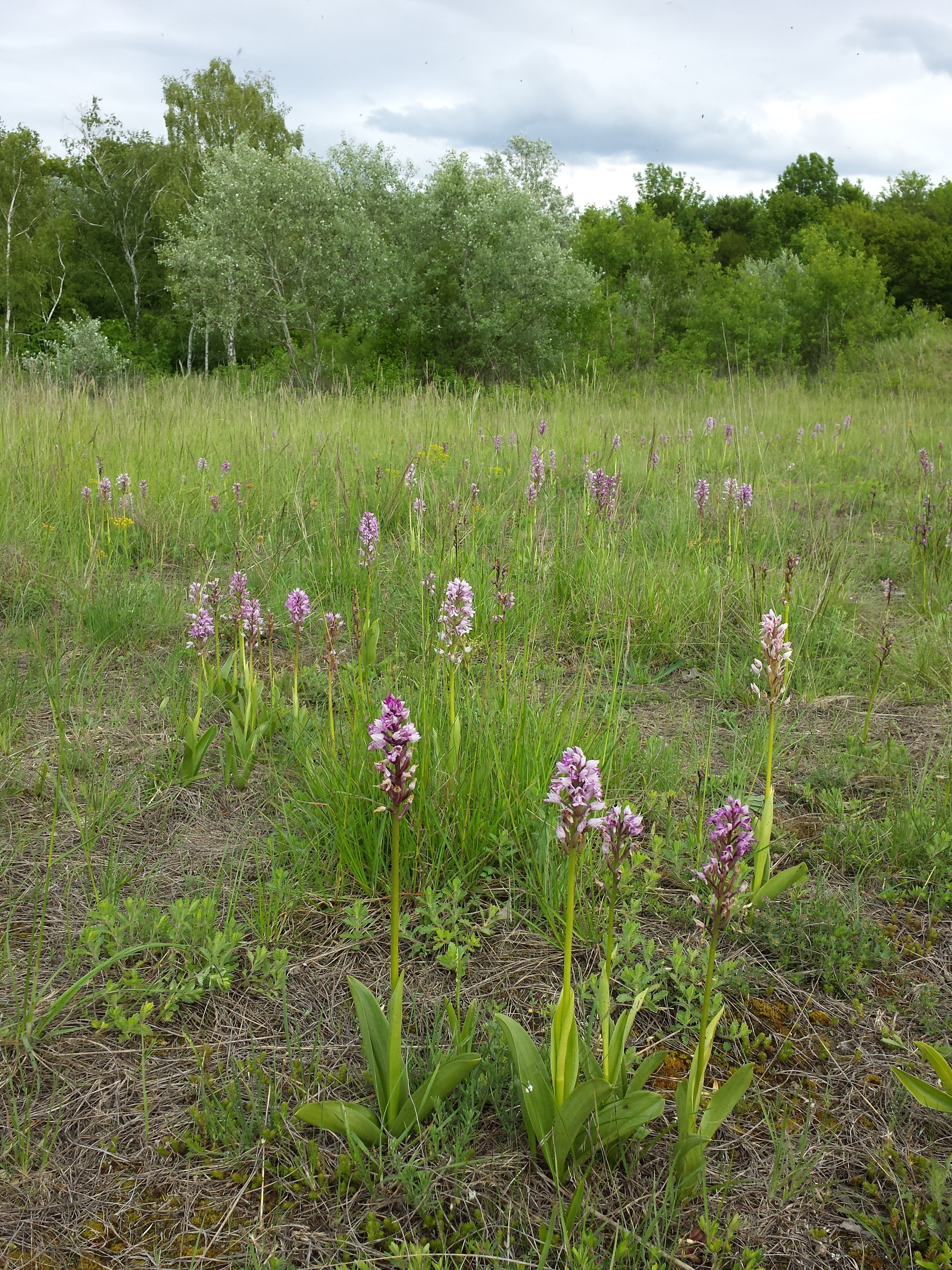
A stand of endangered military orchid.

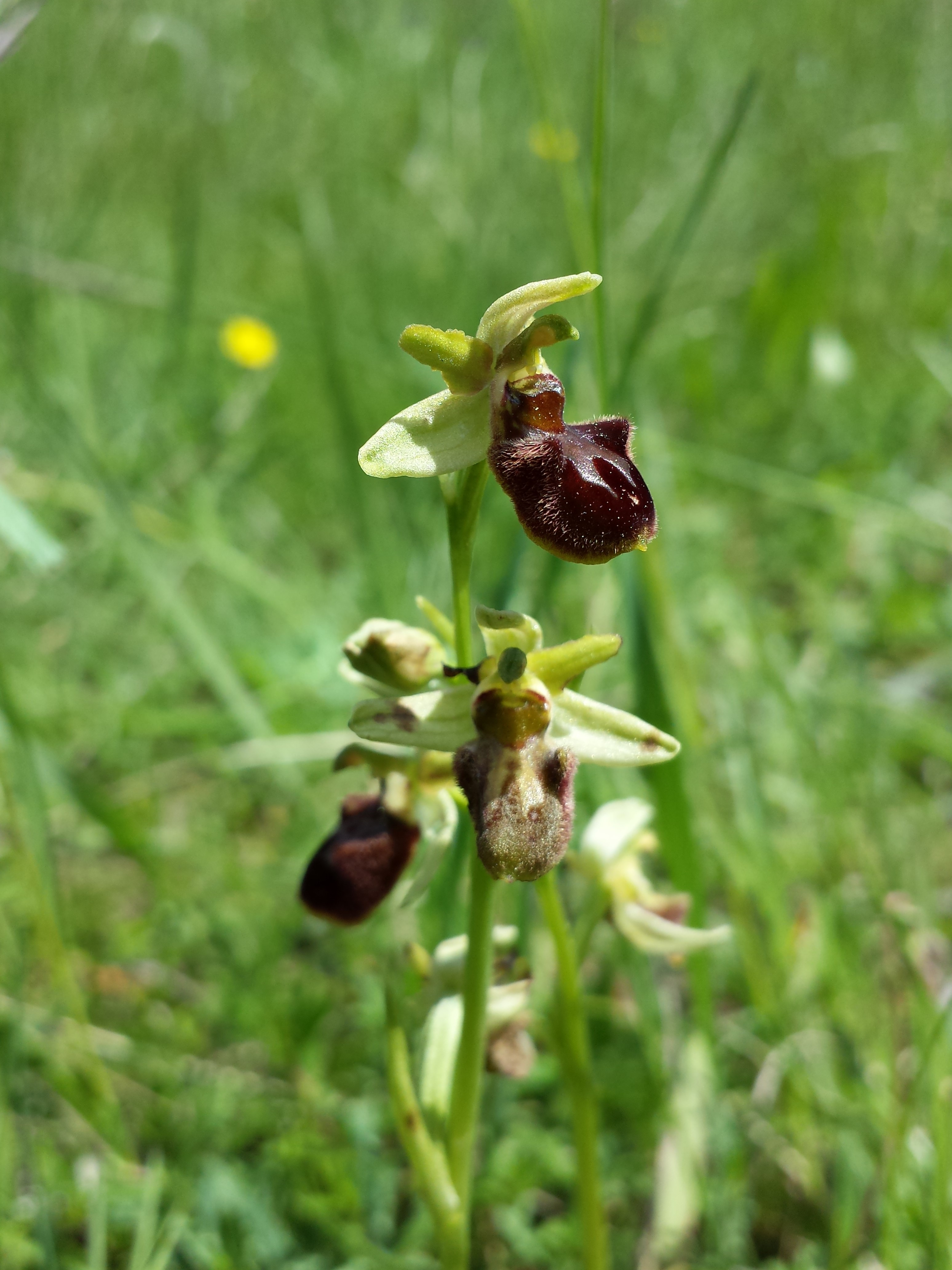
The flowers of the very endangered early spider-orchid imitate the female sand bee, and so entice the male bees to land and thus pollinate the plants

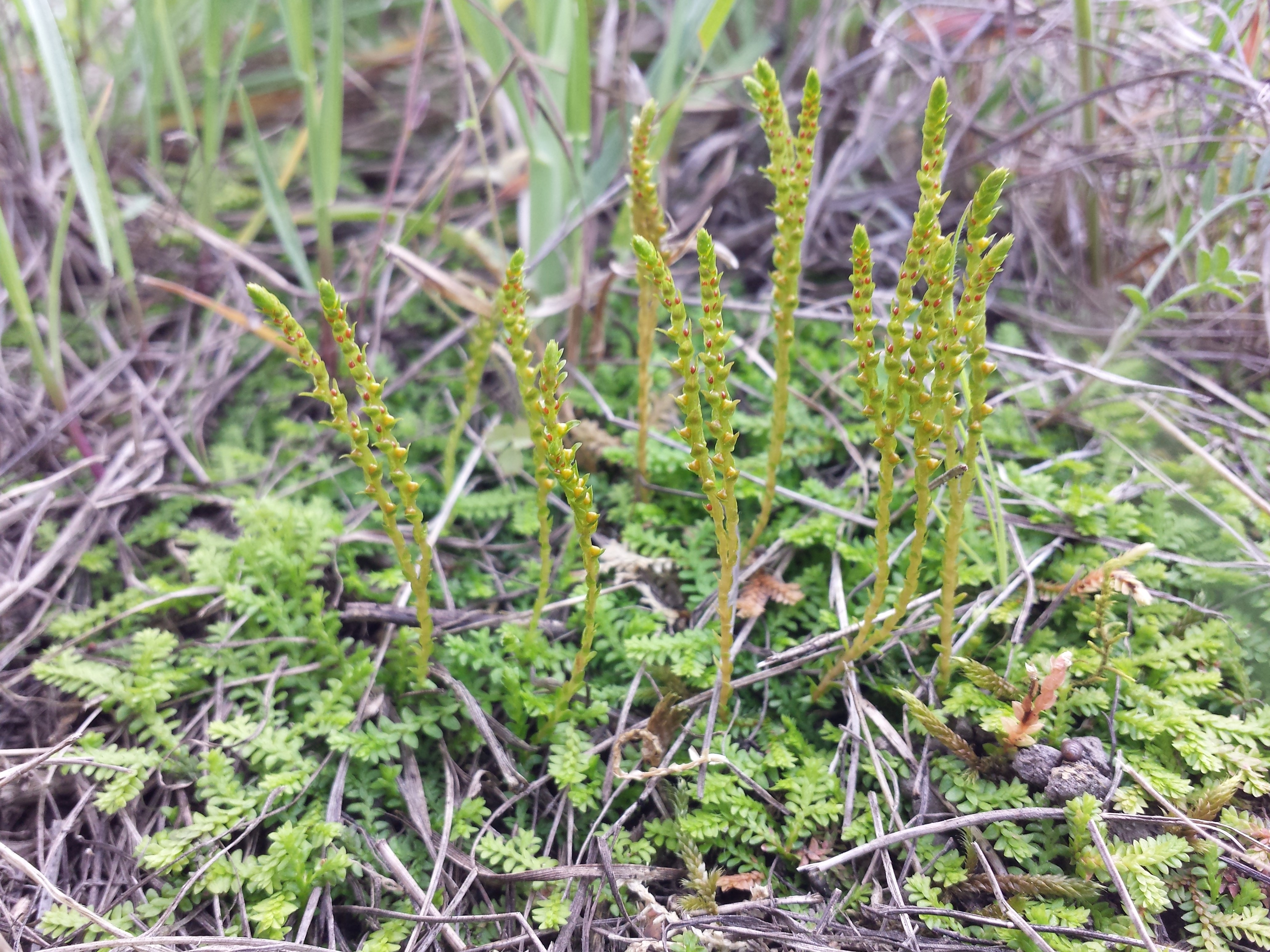
The Swiss spikemoss (Schweiz-Moosfarn) is a nondescript spikemoss and is endangered in the Austrian portions of the Pannonian geobotanical region in Central Europe.
