= Sommerein =

- Municipality
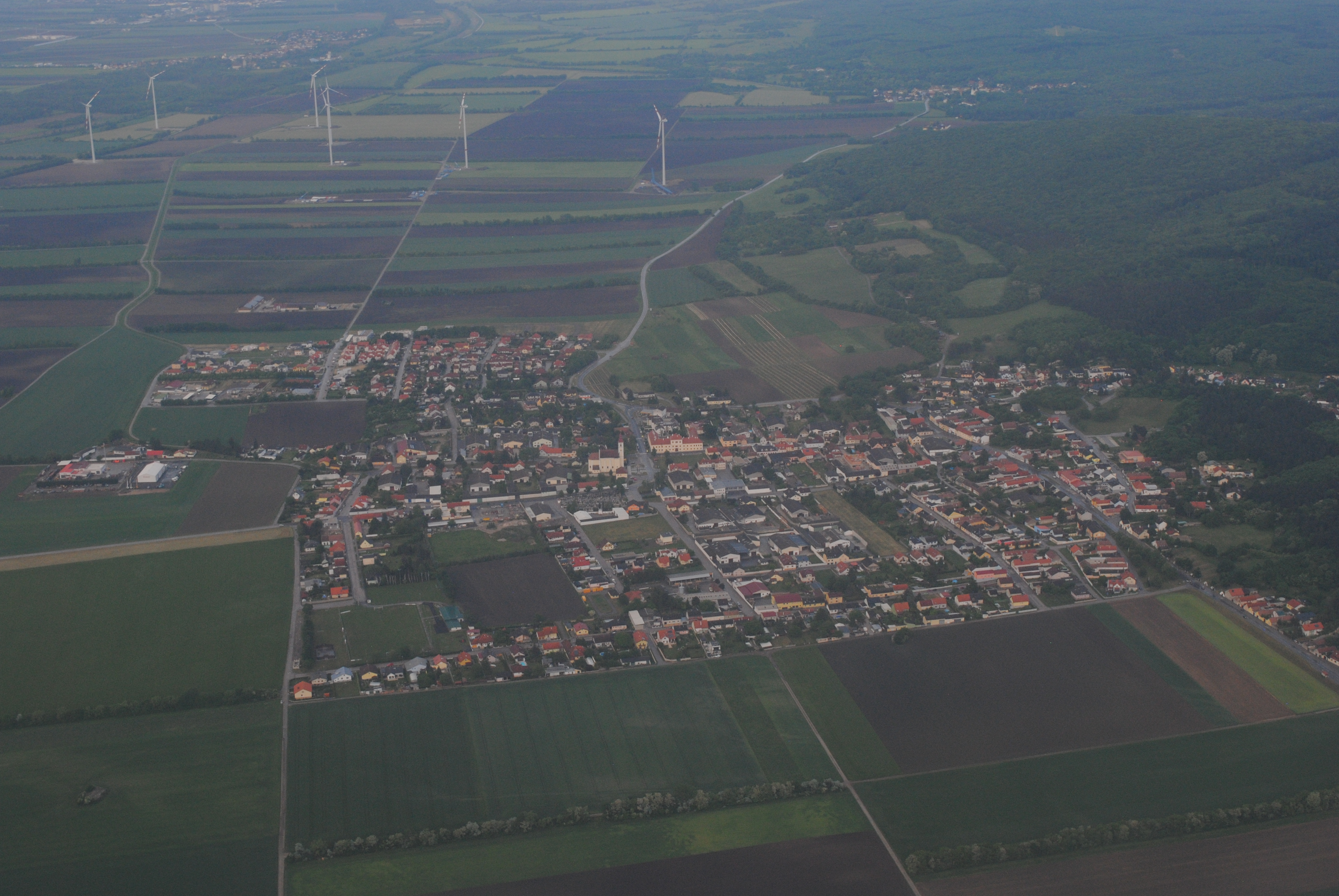
- Aerial view of Sommerein

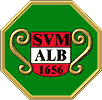
- Coat of arms

- Location within Austria
- Coordinates: 47°58′N 16°36′E
- Country: Austria
- State: Lower Austria
- District: Bruck an der Leitha

Government
  - Mayor: Karl Zwierschitz

Area
  - Total: 41.51 km^{2} (16.03 sq mi)
- Elevation: 197 m (646 ft)

Population (2018-01-01)
  - Total: 1,947
  - Density: 46.90/km^{2} (121.5/sq mi)
- Time zone: UTC+1 (CET)
  - Summer (DST): UTC+2 (CEST)
- Postal code: 2453
- Area code: 02168
- Website: www.sommerein.at

Sommerein is a town in the district of Bruck an der Leitha in the Austrian state of Lower Austria.

== Geography ==
Sommerein lies in the industrial area of Lower Austria. About 34.83 percent of the municipality is forested.
