= Orth an der Donau =

- Municipality
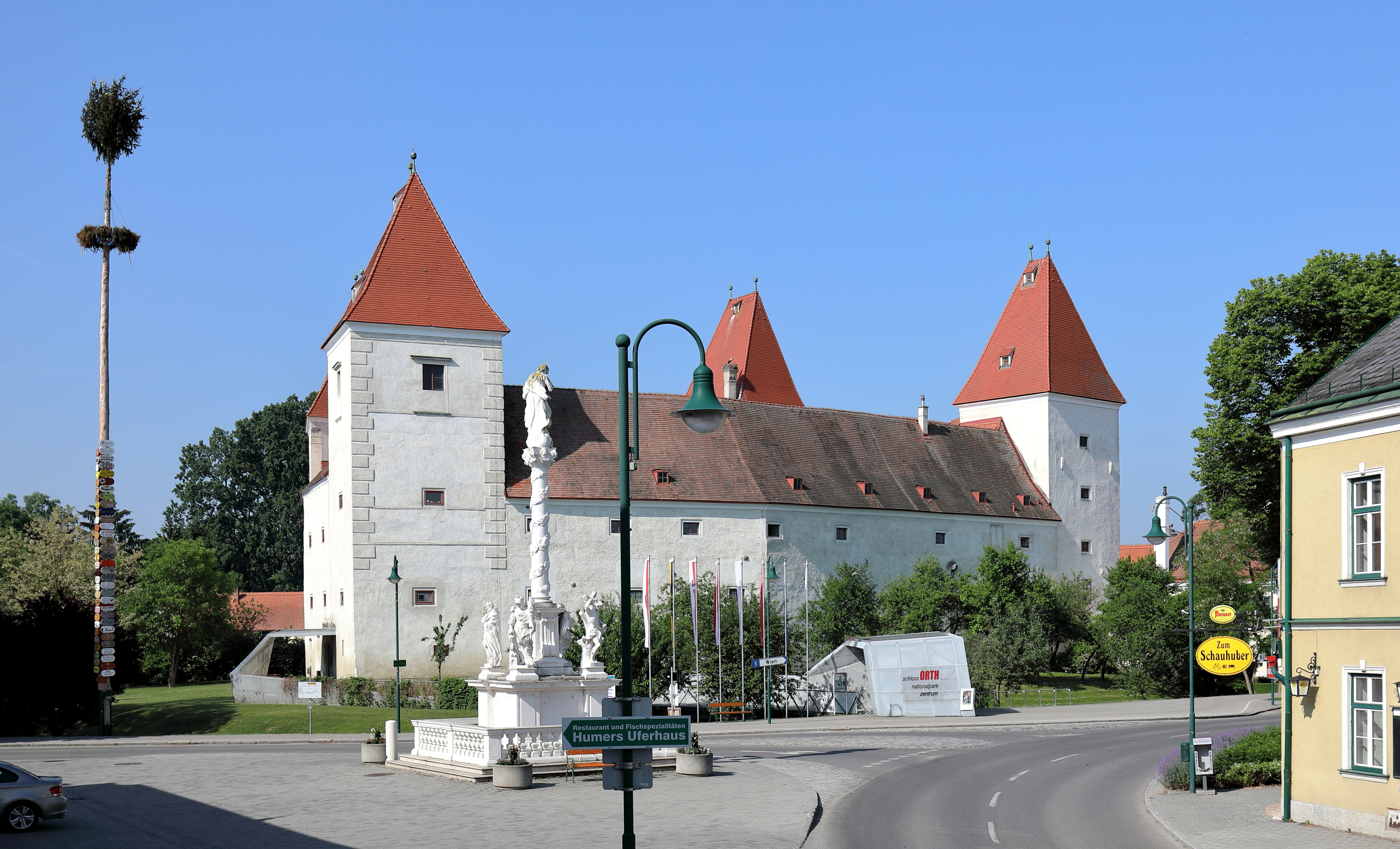
- Castle and the Marian column

- Coat of arms

- Location within Austria
- Coordinates: 48°8′40″N 16°42′05″E
- Country: Austria
- State: Lower Austria
- District: Gänserndorf

Government
  - Mayor: Elisabeth Wagnes (ÖVP)

Area
  - Total: 33.42 km^{2} (12.90 sq mi)
- Elevation: 150 m (490 ft)

Population (2024)
  - Total: 2,211
  - Density: 66.16/km^{2} (171.3/sq mi)
- Time zone: UTC+1 (CET)
  - Summer (DST): UTC+2 (CEST)
- Postal code: 2304
- Area code: 02212
- Website: www.orth.at

Orth an der Donau is a town in the district of Gänserndorf in the Austrian state of Lower Austria.

== Geography ==
The town is located on the northern bank of the Danube in the Danube-Auen National Park within the Marchfeld, about 25 km east of the centre of Vienna and 30 km west of Bratislava. 31 percent of the town is forested.

== History ==
The first reference to the town comes from a deed of gift from the year 1021. During the Ottoman campaign of 1529, Orth and the surrounding region suffered severe devastation, leaving many areas depopulated. To repopulate the land, Croatian settlers were brought in, eventually forming the majority of the local population for centuries. After the medieval fortress was destroyed that same year, Nicholas, Count of Salm initiated reconstruction around 1550. From 1568 onward, the estate saw frequent changes in ownership. In the 1600s, the moated castle primarily served as a hunting retreat. It was later captured by Swedish forces under Lennart Torstensson during the Thirty Years’ War. In 1679, Count Auersperg added the so-called "New Castle" beside the old structure.

In 1802, Napoleon's sister, Caroline Bonaparte, briefly lived in the castle. Emperor Francis I acquired the estate in 1824, incorporating it into the Habsburg family’s private holdings. From 1873, Crown Prince Rudolf used the property for hunting and had it refurbished in the late historicist style.

In the 19th century, Orth and neighbouring Haringsee hosted leech farms that supplied Vienna’s hospitals. However, they couldn’t compete long-term with the more successful French producers and eventually shut down. After the monarchy ended, Orth Castle was transferred to a fund for war victims.

On the night of September 16–17, 1926, around 120 mostly unemployed people from Vienna occupied the former Habsburg hunting grounds at Oberau. They began clearing the forest and set up a tent camp, intending to build a new settlement. Media coverage drew even more people - eventually around 800 gathered. After extended negotiations, they agreed to leave and were granted use of a cleared area on the Kaiserplateau, a wooded ridge near Pressbaum.

== Culture and sights ==
- Orth Castle: A grand three-story structure with three wings and four prominent corner towers. The western wing dates back to the 12th century. After sustaining major damage during the Habsburg–Ottoman wars in 1529, the castle was rebuilt in 1550, preserving its original layout and architectural style. The surrounding castle park is home to various native animals, including European pond turtles, European ground squirrels, and several snake species such as the grass snake, dice snake, and Aesculapian snake.
- Danube-Auen National Park: Since 1996, the castle has served as the headquarters and visitor center for the Danube-Auen National Park.
- museumORTH: A local history museum in the castle.
- Church of St. Michael: Originally a fortified church, it was rebuilt after significant damage in 1529 and remodeled in 1689 in the Baroque style, preserving its late Gothic core.
- Ship mill: Of the originally up to 60 ship mills that once operated along the Danube downstream of Vienna, one functional example has been preserved. After sinking, it was recovered and restored in 2008.

== Gallery ==
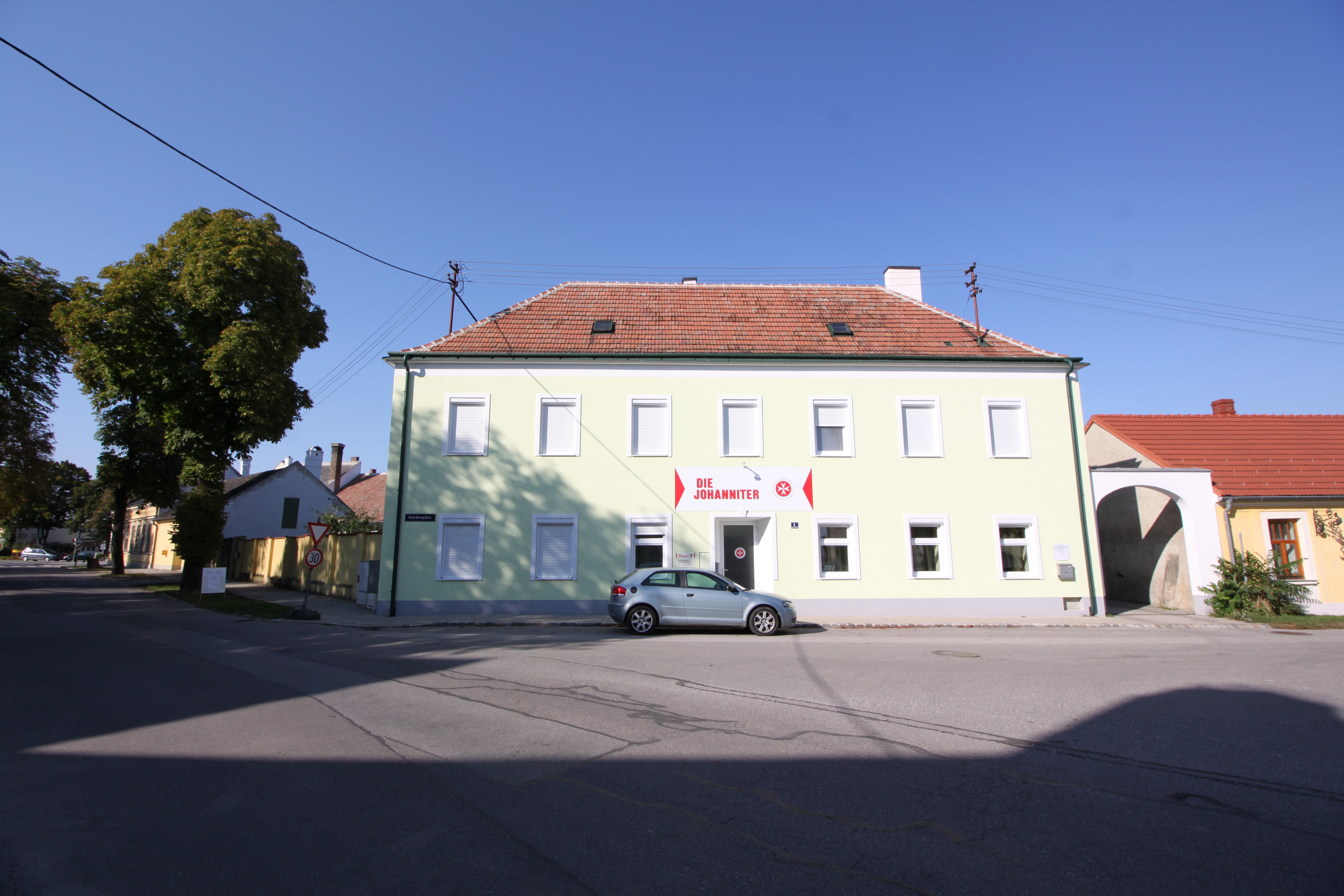
A house in the town.

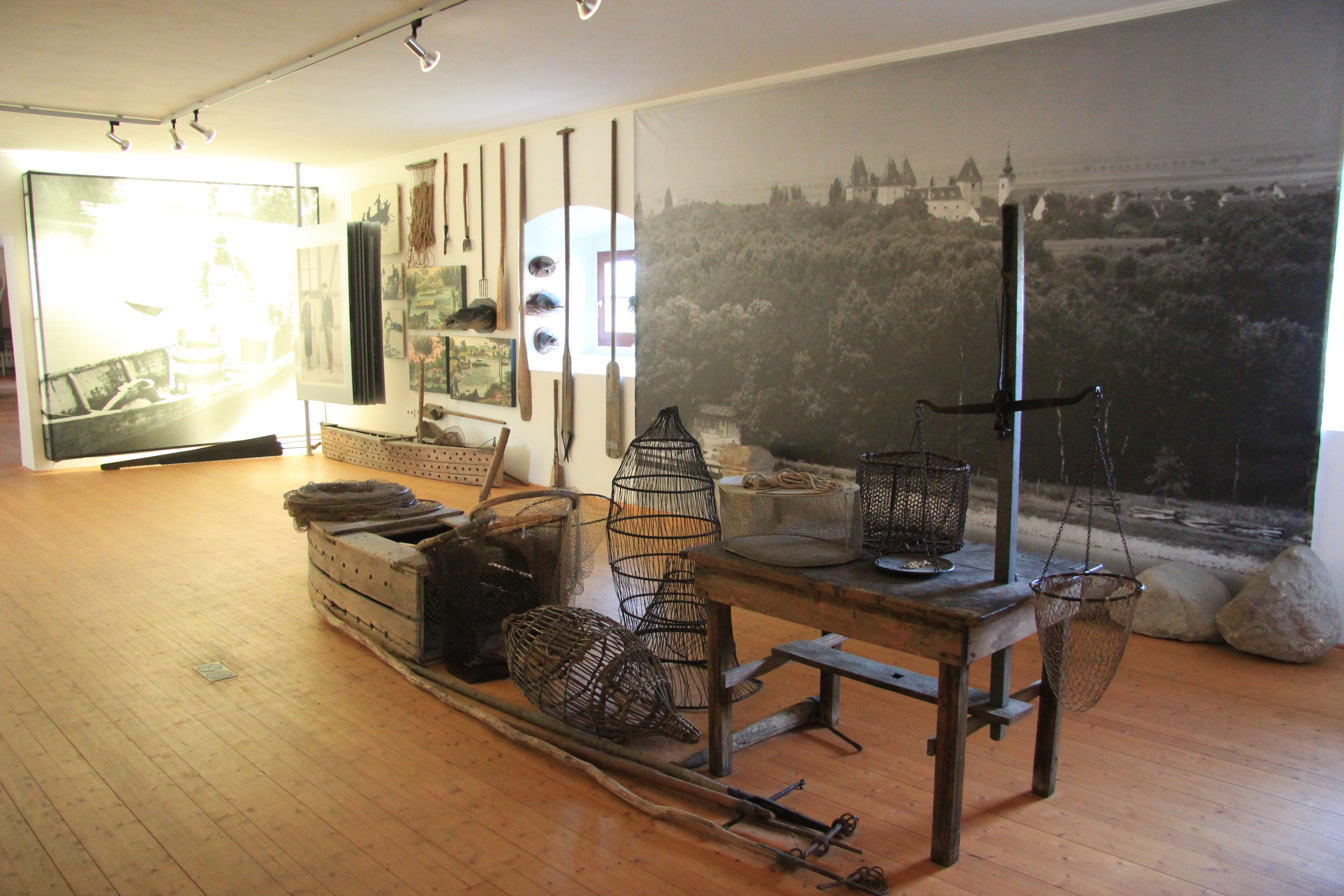
The museum in the castle.

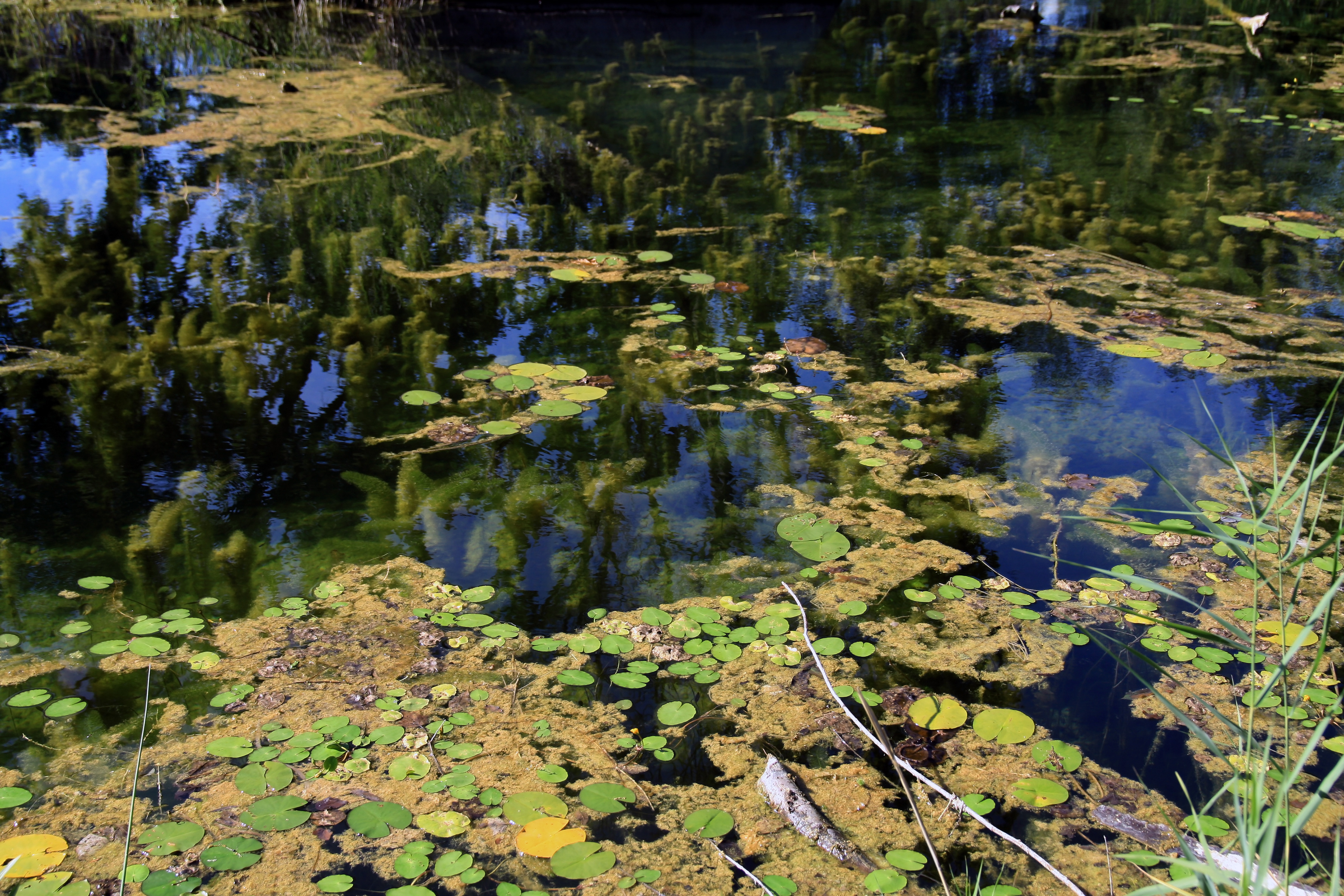
The pond in the castle park.

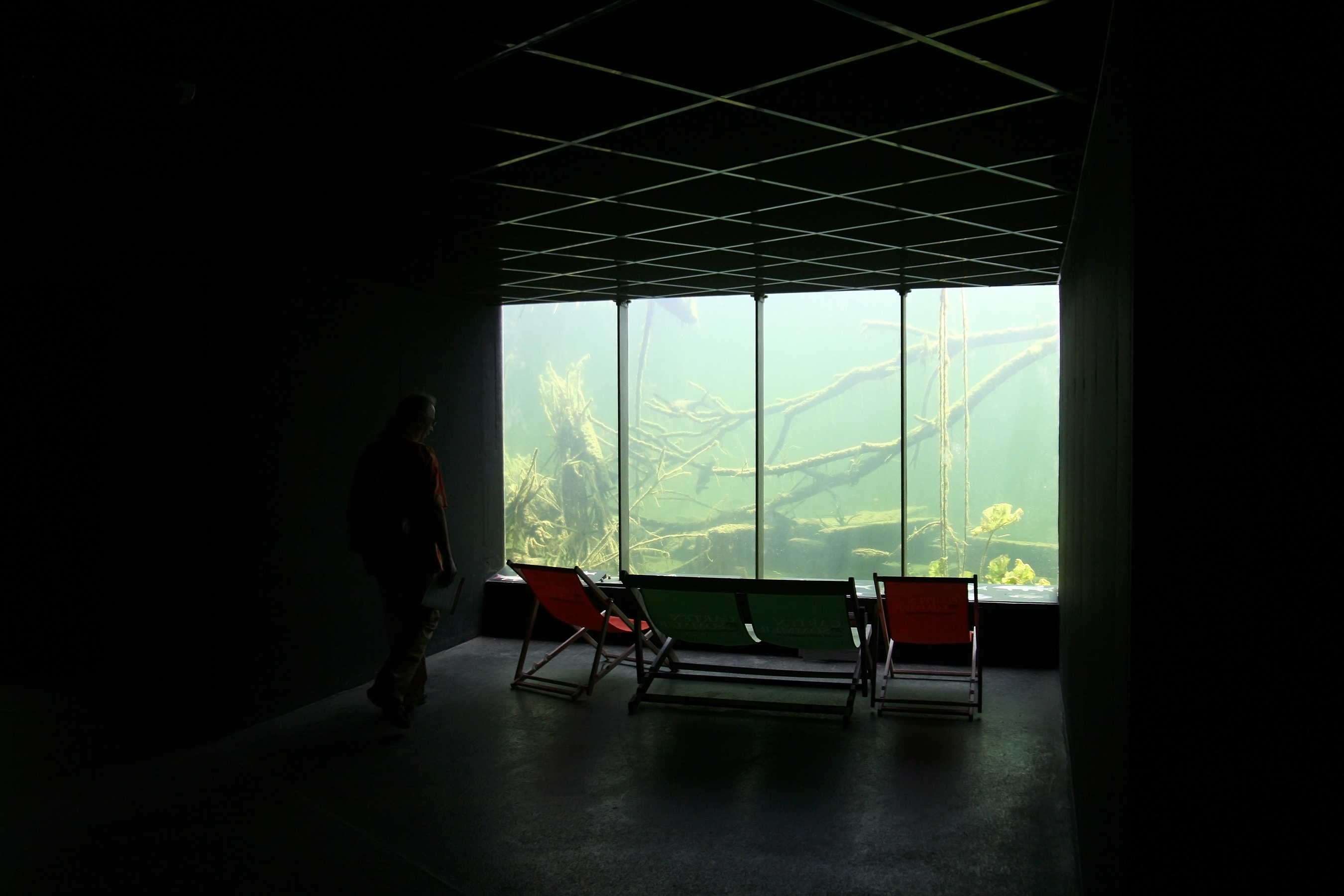
A view into the pond in the castle park.

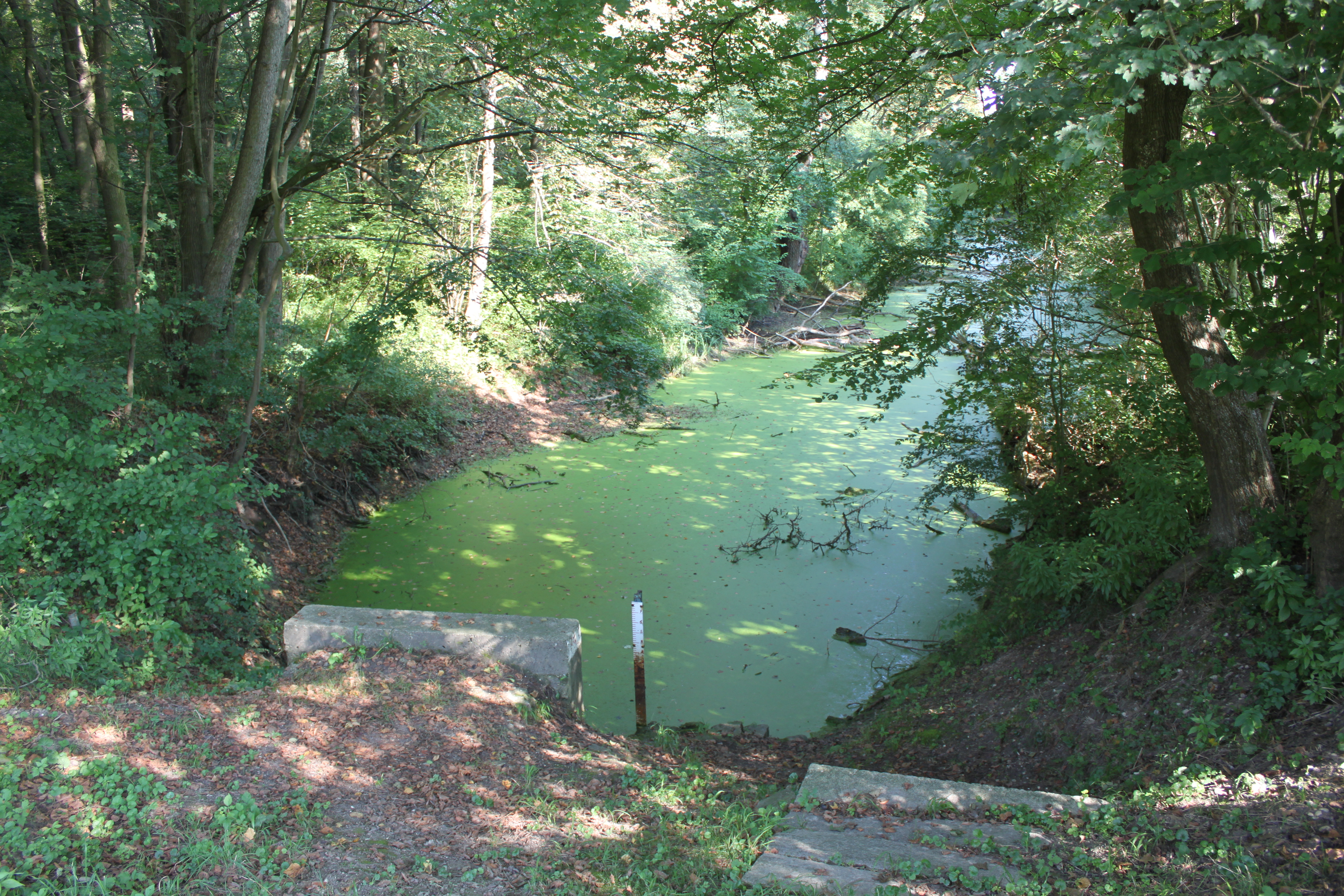
The Fadenbach

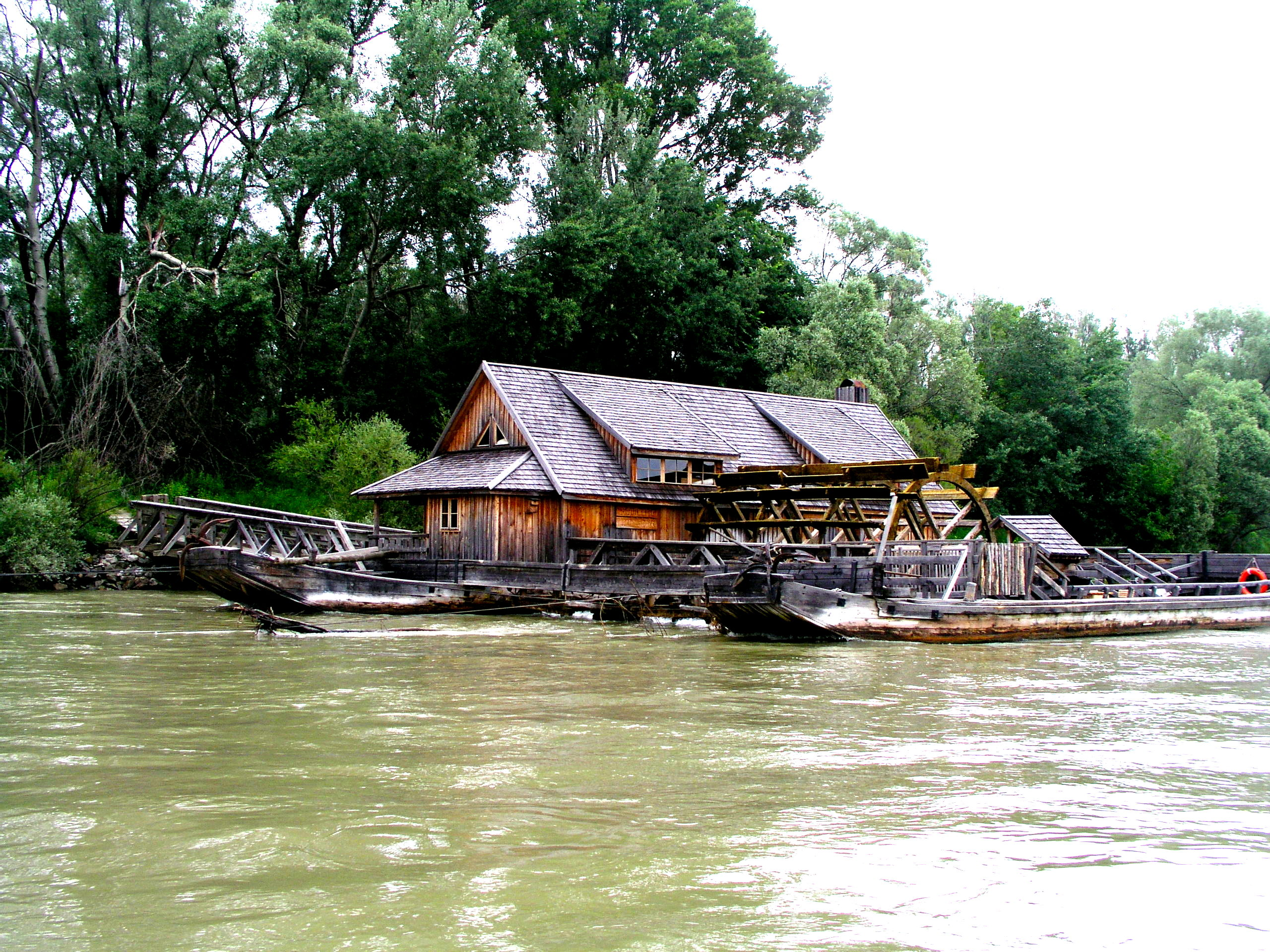
The ship mill on the Danube

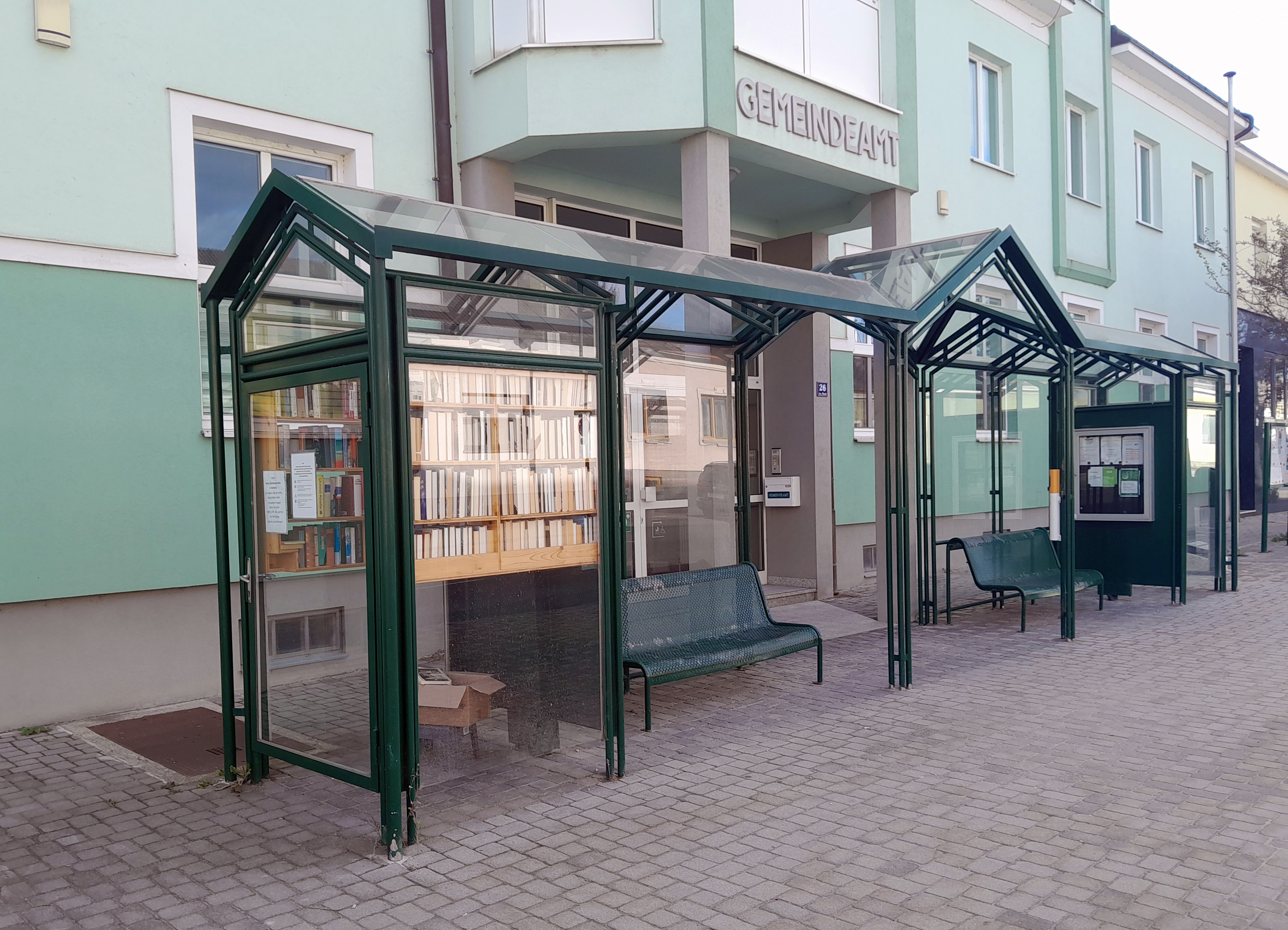
A bus stop in the town.
