= Prellenkirchen =

- Municipality
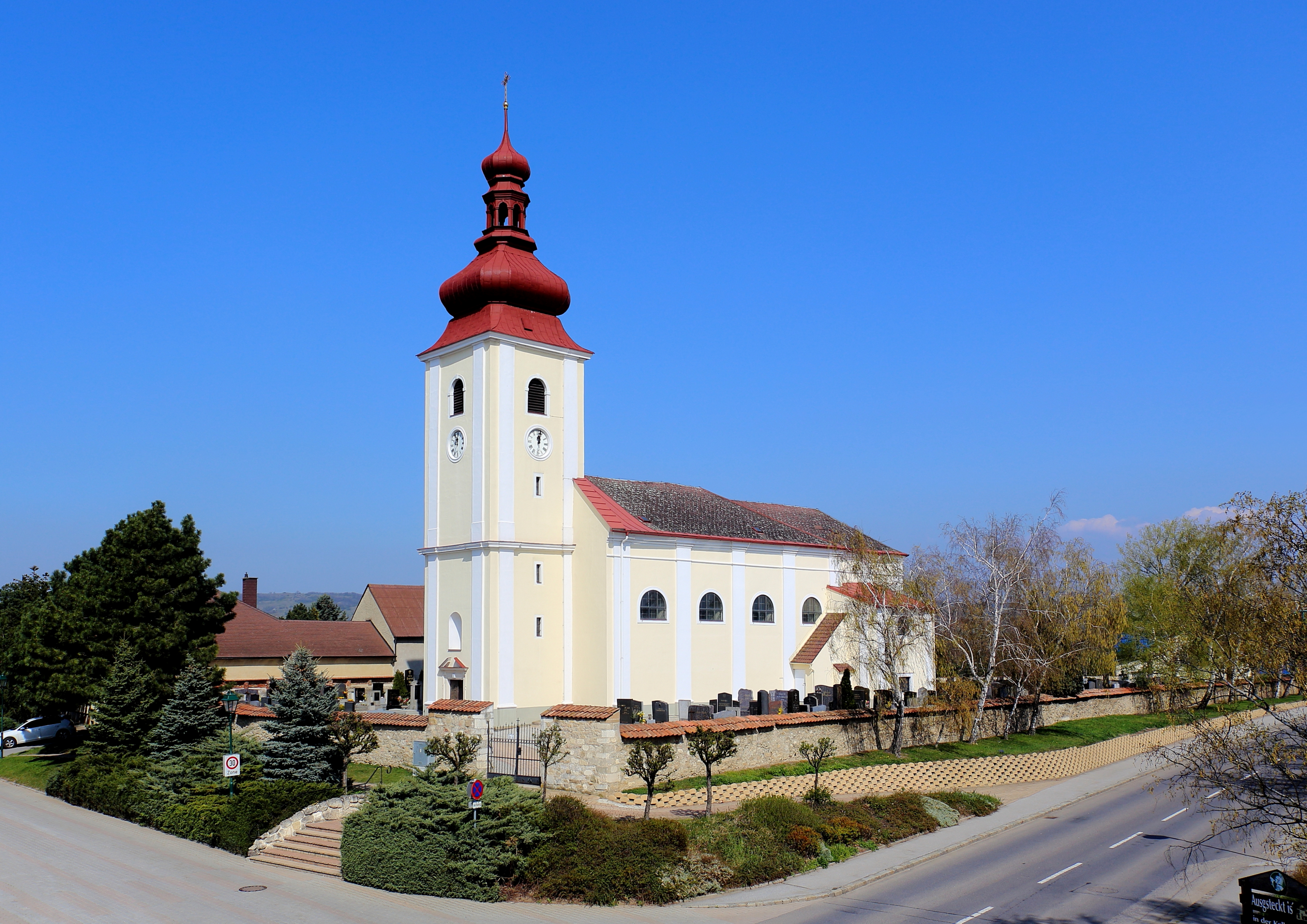
- Prellenkirchen parish church

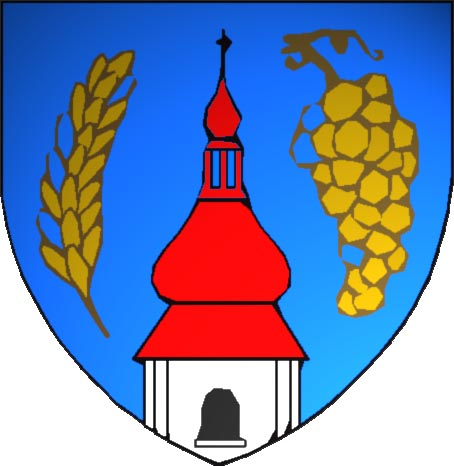
- Coat of arms

- Location within Austria
- Coordinates: 48°4′N 16°56′E
- Country: Austria
- State: Lower Austria
- District: Bruck an der Leitha

Government
  - Mayor: Johann Köck

Area
  - Total: 41.57 km^{2} (16.05 sq mi)
- Elevation: 178 m (584 ft)

Population (2018-01-01)
  - Total: 1,577
  - Density: 37.94/km^{2} (98.25/sq mi)
- Time zone: UTC+1 (CET)
  - Summer (DST): UTC+2 (CEST)
- Postal code: 2472
- Area code: +43 2145
- Website: www.prellenkirchen.at

Prellenkirchen is a town in the district of Bruck an der Leitha in Lower Austria in Austria.

== Geography ==
Prellenkirchen lies in the industrial area of Lower Austria. About 5.55 percent of the municipality is forested.
