= Scharndorf =

- Municipality
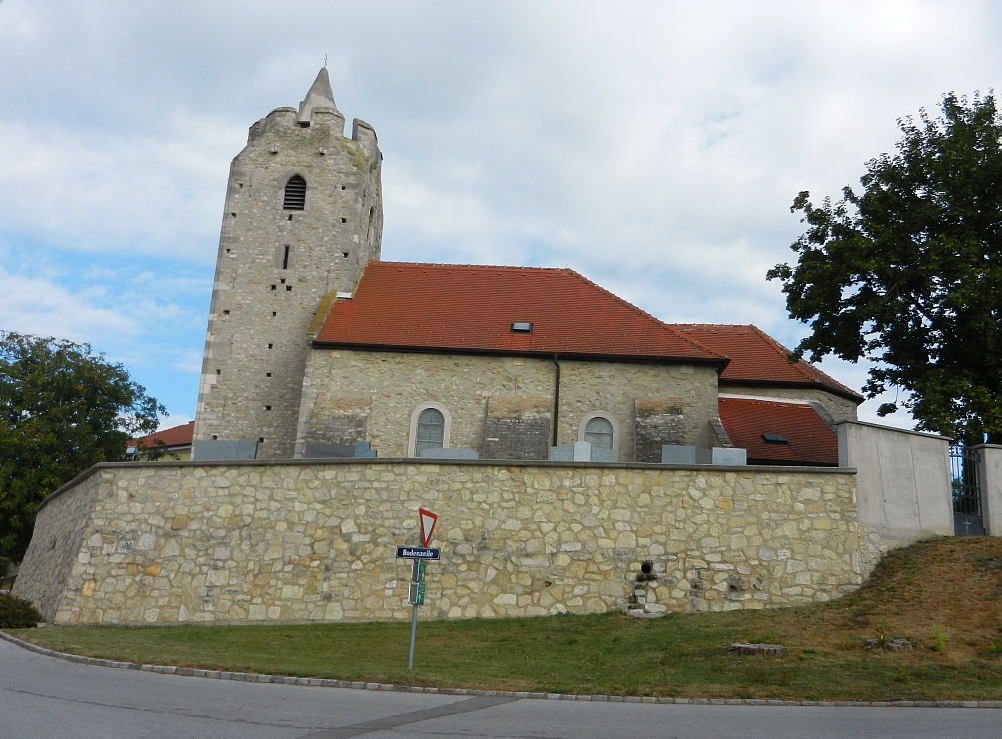
- Scharndorf parish church

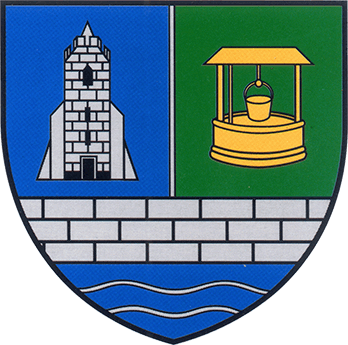
- Coat of arms

- Location within Austria
- Coordinates: 48°4′N 16°46′E
- Country: Austria
- State: Lower Austria
- District: Bruck an der Leitha

Government
  - Mayor: Hubert Zwickelstorfer

Area
  - Total: 25.84 km^{2} (9.98 sq mi)
- Elevation: 187 m (614 ft)

Population (2018-01-01)
  - Total: 1,159
  - Density: 44.85/km^{2} (116.2/sq mi)
- Time zone: UTC+1 (CET)
  - Summer (DST): UTC+2 (CEST)
- Postal code: 2403
- Area code: 02163

Scharndorf is a town in the district of Bruck an der Leitha in Lower Austria in Austria.

== Geography ==
Scharndorf lies in the industrial area of Lower Austria. About 16.67 percent of the municipality is forested.
