= Hof am Leithaberge =

- Municipality
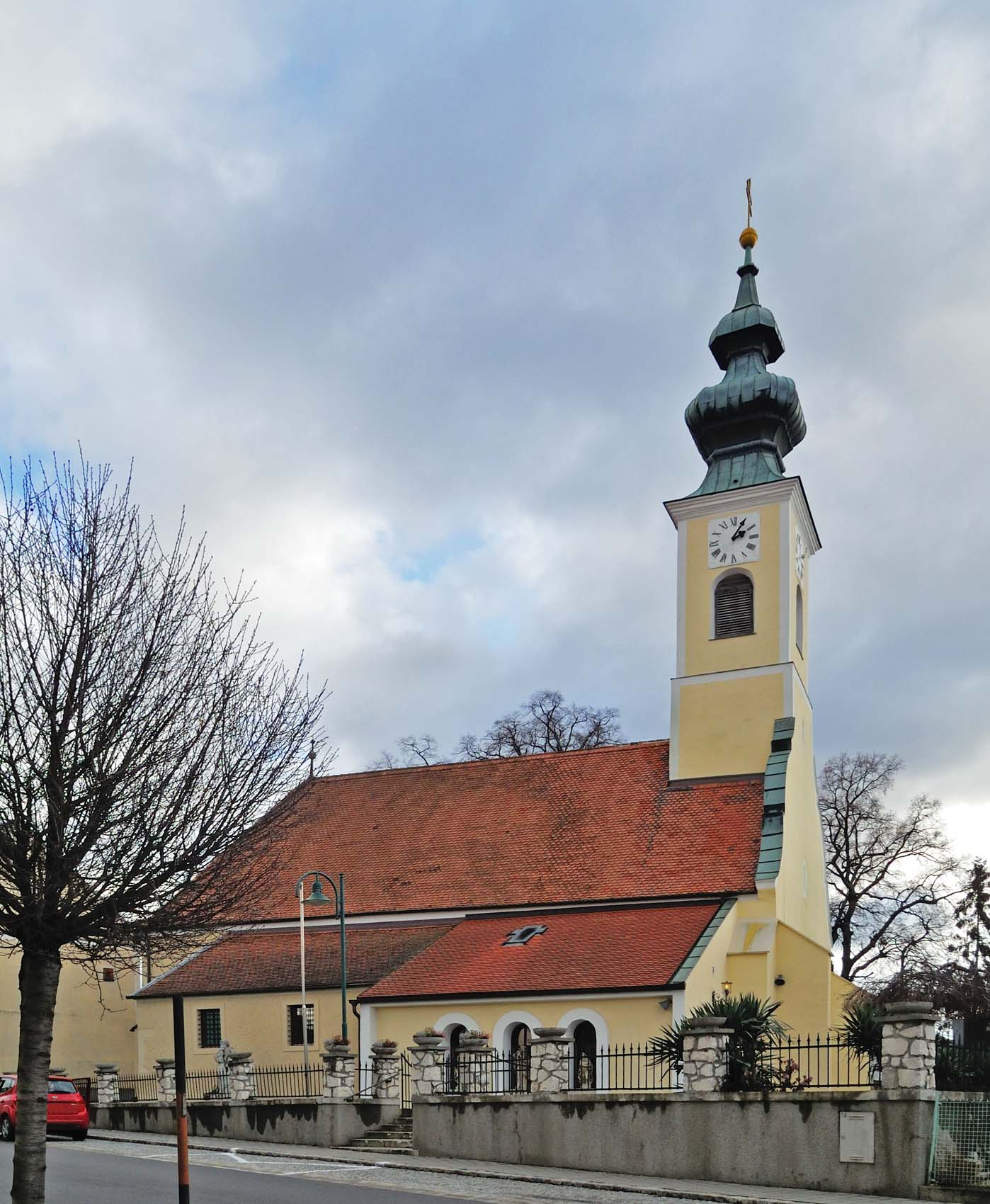
- Hof am Leithaberge parish church

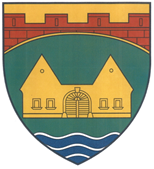
- Coat of arms

- Location within Austria
- Coordinates: 47°57′N 16°35′E
- Country: Austria
- State: Lower Austria
- District: Bruck an der Leitha

Government
  - Mayor: Hubert Germershausen

Area
  - Total: 22.02 km^{2} (8.50 sq mi)
- Elevation: 215 m (705 ft)

Population (2018-01-01)
  - Total: 1,549
  - Density: 70.35/km^{2} (182.2/sq mi)
- Time zone: UTC+1 (CET)
  - Summer (DST): UTC+2 (CEST)
- Postal code: 2451
- Area code: 02168
- Website: www.hof-leithaberge.gv.at

Hof am Leithaberge is a town in the district of Bruck an der Leitha in Lower Austria in Austria.

== Geography ==
Hof am Leithaberge lies in the industrial area of Lower Austria. About 36.74 percent of the municipality is forested.
