= Höflein =

- Municipality
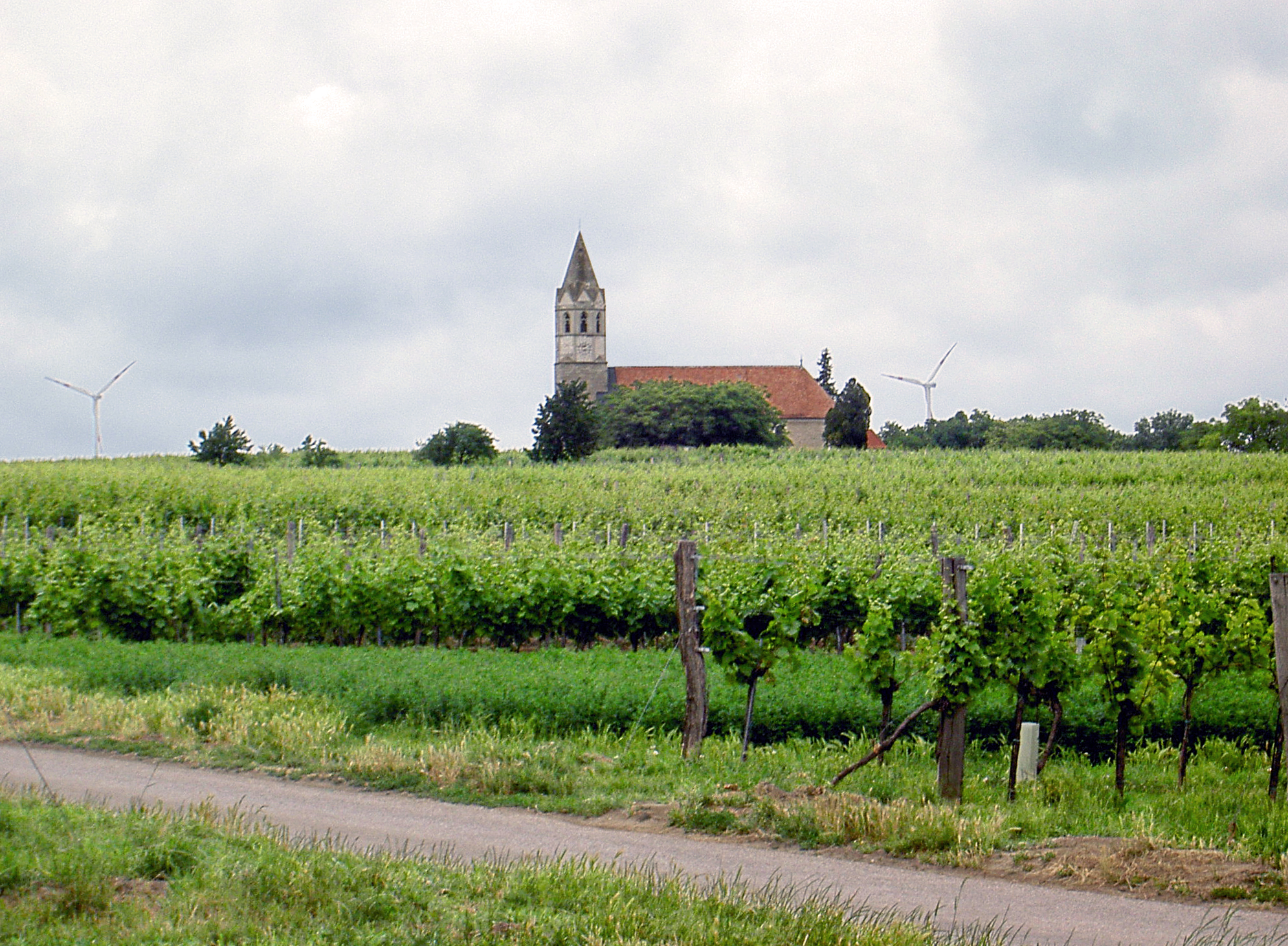
- Church of Saint Ulrich

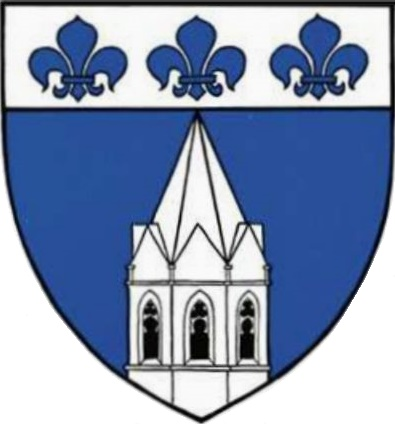
- Coat of arms

- Location within Lower Austria Location within Austria
- Coordinates: 48°3′N 16°47′E
- Country: Austria
- State: Lower Austria
- District: Bruck an der Leitha

Government
  - Mayor: Otto Auer (ÖVP)

Area
  - Total: 22.39 km^{2} (8.64 sq mi)
- Elevation: 170 m (560 ft)

Population (2018-01-01)
  - Total: 1,234
  - Density: 55.11/km^{2} (142.7/sq mi)
- Time zone: UTC+1 (CET)
  - Summer (DST): UTC+2 (CEST)
- Postal code: 2465
- Area code: 02162
- Website: www.hoeflein.at

Höflein is a town in the district of Bruck an der Leitha in Lower Austria in Austria.

== Geography ==
Höflein lies in the industrial area of Lower Austria. About 15 percent of the municipality is forested.
