= Götzendorf an der Leitha =

- Municipality
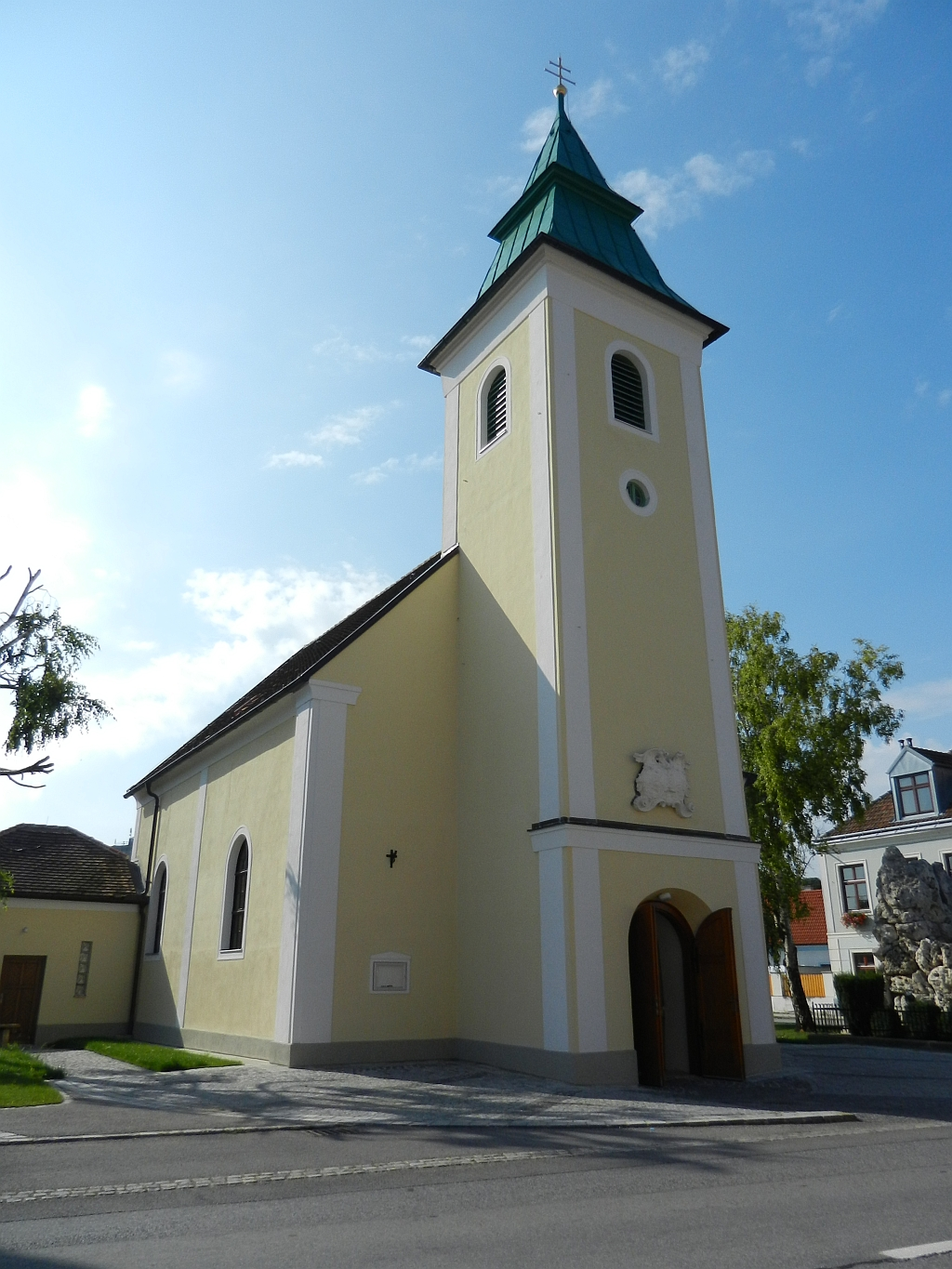
- Goetzendorf an der Leitha parish church

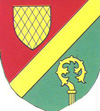
- Coat of arms

- Location within Austria
- Coordinates: 48°1′N 16°34′E
- Country: Austria
- State: Lower Austria
- District: Bruck an der Leitha

Government
  - Mayor: Johann Ackermann website = www.goetzendorf.com

Area
  - Total: 25.4 km^{2} (9.8 sq mi)
- Elevation: 171 m (561 ft)

Population (2018-01-01)
  - Total: 2,062
  - Density: 81.2/km^{2} (210/sq mi)
- Time zone: UTC+1 (CET)
  - Summer (DST): UTC+2 (CEST)
- Postal code: 2434
- Area code: 02169

Götzendorf an der Leitha is a village in the district of Bruck an der Leitha in Lower Austria in Austria.

Up until the end of the Cold War it was the headquarters of the 9th Panzergrenadier Brigade of the 1st Panzergrenadier Division with the 9th Panzer Staff Battalion (12 × M42 Duster); 33rd Panzer Battalion (54 × M60 Patton); 35th Panzergrenadier Battalion (65 × Saurer SPzA1 IFVs, 12 × SK-105 Kürassier, 8 × SPzA1GrW 81 mm mortars); 1st Jagdpanzer (Tank-destroyer) Battalion (60 × SK-105 Kürassier); and the 9th Panzer Artillery Battalion (18 × M109 155 mm howitzer).

== Geography ==
Götzendorf an der Leitha lies in the industrial area of Lower Austria. About 4.76 percent of the municipality is forested.
