= Bruck an der Leitha District =

Coordinates: 48.067°N 16.779°E

Bruck an der Leitha District Bezirk Bruck aun da Leitha
- District
- Country: Austria
- State: Lower Austria
- Number of municipalities: 33
- Administrative seat: Bruck an der Leitha

Government
  - District Governor: Peter Suchanek

Area
  - Total: 703.0 km^{2} (271.4 sq mi)

Population (1 January 2016)
  - Total: 98,244
  - Density: 139.7/km^{2} (361.9/sq mi)
- Time zone: UTC+01:00 (CET)
  - Summer (DST): UTC+02:00 (CEST)
- Vehicle registration: BL (SW) (Note: SW for the city of Schwechat, BL elsewhere.)
- NUTS code: AT122

Bezirk Bruck an der Leitha (Central Bavarian: Bruck aun da Leitha) is a district of the state of Lower Austria in Austria.

== Municipalities ==
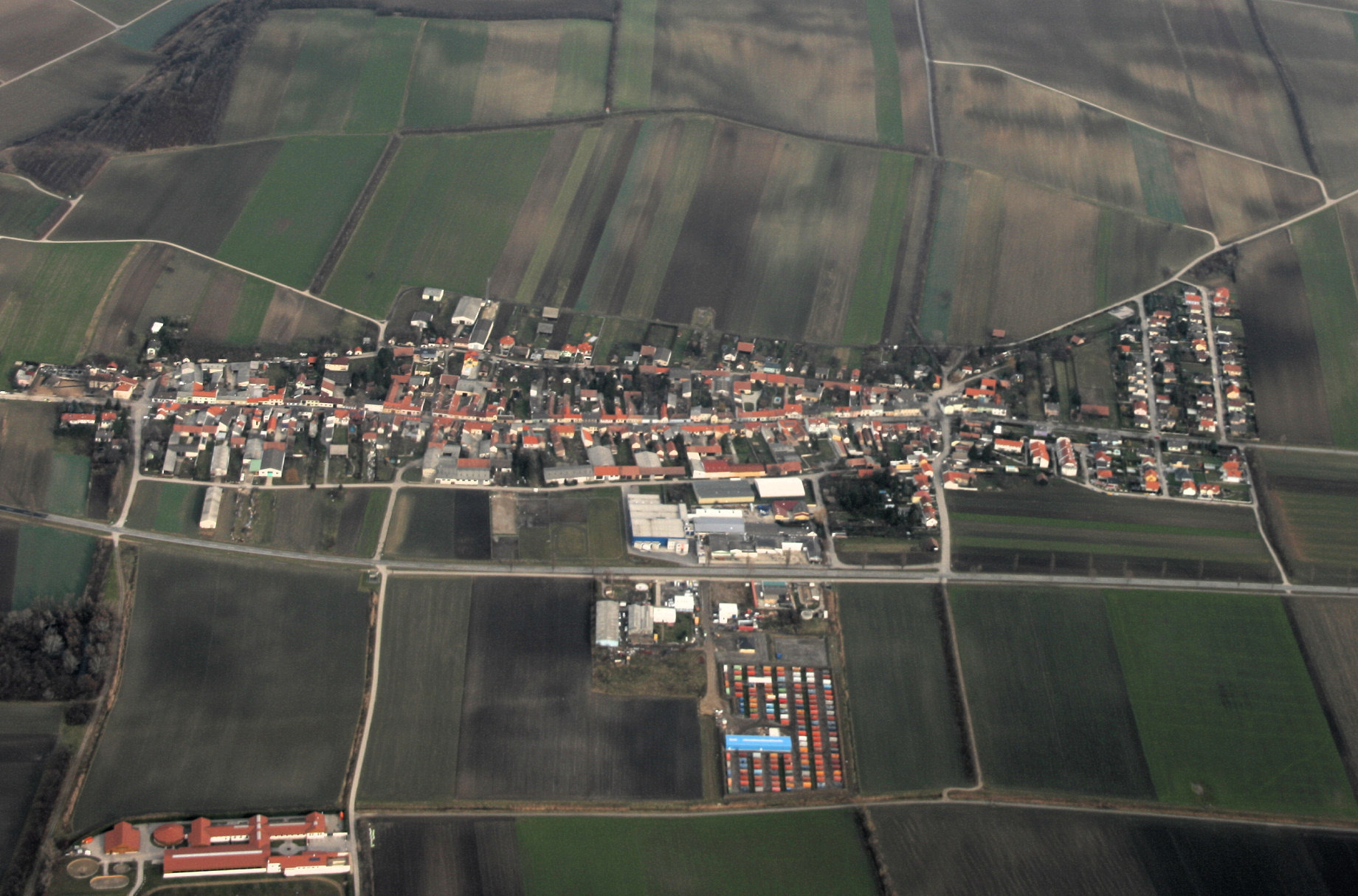
Gallbrunn, Austria

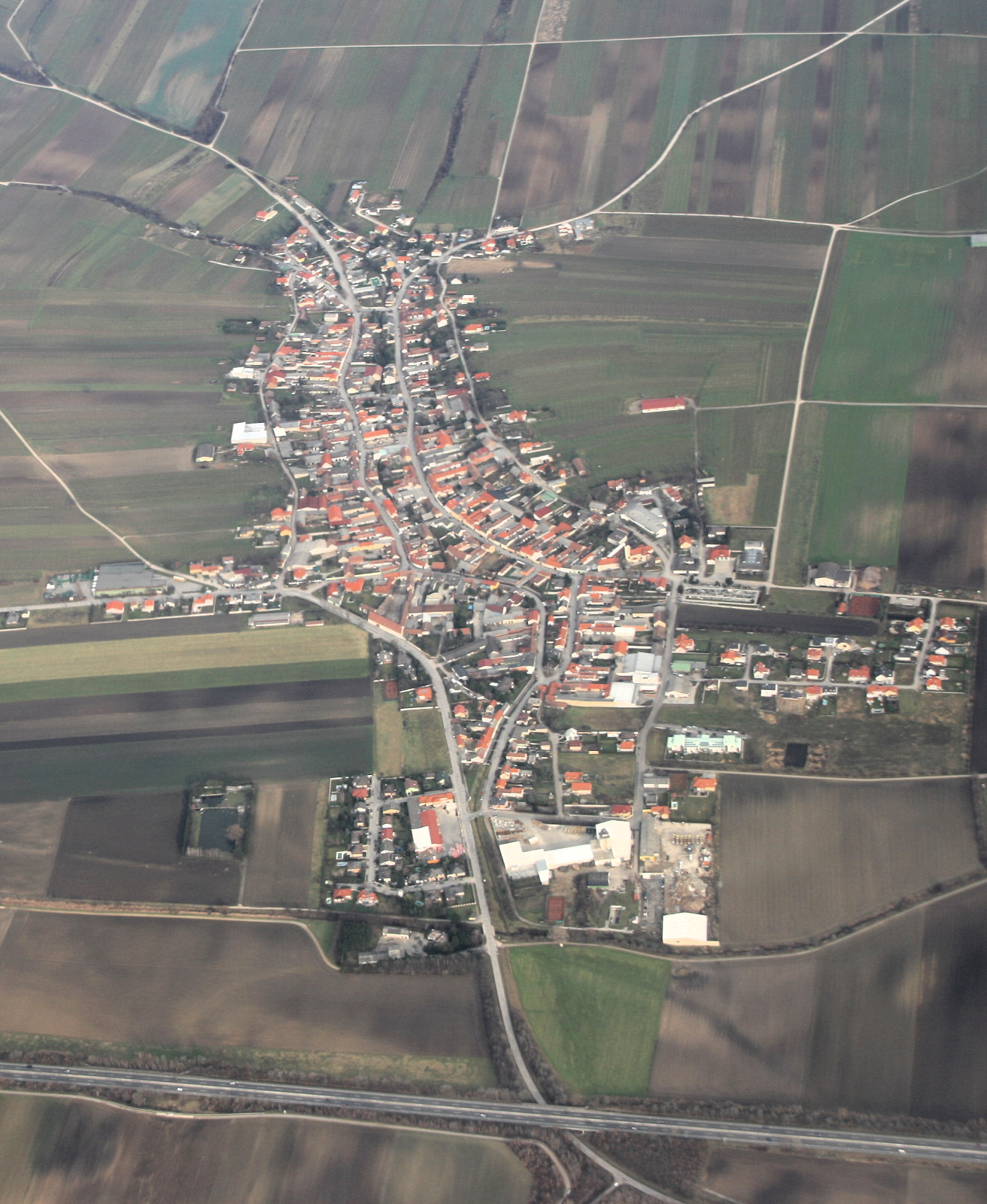
Göttlesbrunn, Austria

Towns (German: Städte) are indicated in bold; market towns (Marktgemeinden) in italics; suburbs, hamlets and other subdivisions of a municipality are indicated by lower dots.

- Au am Leithaberge
- Bad Deutsch-Altenburg
- Berg
- Bruck an der Leitha
  - Bruck an der Leitha, Wilfleinsdorf, Schloss Prugg
- Ebergassing
  - Ebergassing, Wienerherberg
- Enzersdorf an der Fischa
  - Enzersdorf an der Fischa, Margarethen am Moos
- **Fischamend**
  - Fischamend-Dorf, Fischamend-Markt
- Göttlesbrunn-Arbesthal
  - Arbesthal, Göttlesbrunn
- Götzendorf an der Leitha
  - Götzendorf an der Leitha, Pischelsdorf
- Gramatneusiedl
- **Hainburg an der Donau**
- Haslau-Maria Ellend
  - Haslau an der Donau, Maria Ellend
- Himberg
  - Himberg, Velm, Pellendorf, Gutenhof
- Hof am Leithaberge
- Höflein
- Hundsheim
- Klein-Neusiedl
- Lanzendorf
- Leopoldsdorf
- Mannersdorf am Leithagebirge
  - Mannersdorf am Leithagebirge, Wasenbruck
- Maria Lanzendorf
- Moosbrunn
- Petronell-Carnuntum
- Prellenkirchen
  - Deutsch-Haslau, Prellenkirchen, Schönabrunn
- Rauchenwarth
- Rohrau
  - Gerhaus, Hollern, Pachfurth, Rohrau
- Scharndorf
  - Regelsbrunn, Scharndorf, Wildungsmauer
- Schwadorf
- **Schwechat**
  - Kledering, Mannswörth, Rannersdorf, Schwechat
- Sommerein
- Trautmannsdorf an der Leitha
  - Gallbrunn, Sarasdorf, Stixneusiedl, Trautmannsdorf an der Leitha
- Wolfsthal
- Zwölfaxing

== Changes ==
In 2017 the district annexed Ebergassing, Fischamend, Gramatneusiedl, Himberg, Klein-Neusiedl, Lanzendorf, Leopoldsdorf, Maria Lanzendorf, Moosbrunn, Rauchenwarth, Schwadorf, Schwechat and Zwölfaxing from the dissolved Wien-Umgebung District.

== See also ==
- Leithagebirge
- Leitha (River)
- Neusiedl am See District
- Eisenstadt-Umgebung District
