= Au am Leithaberge =

- Municipality
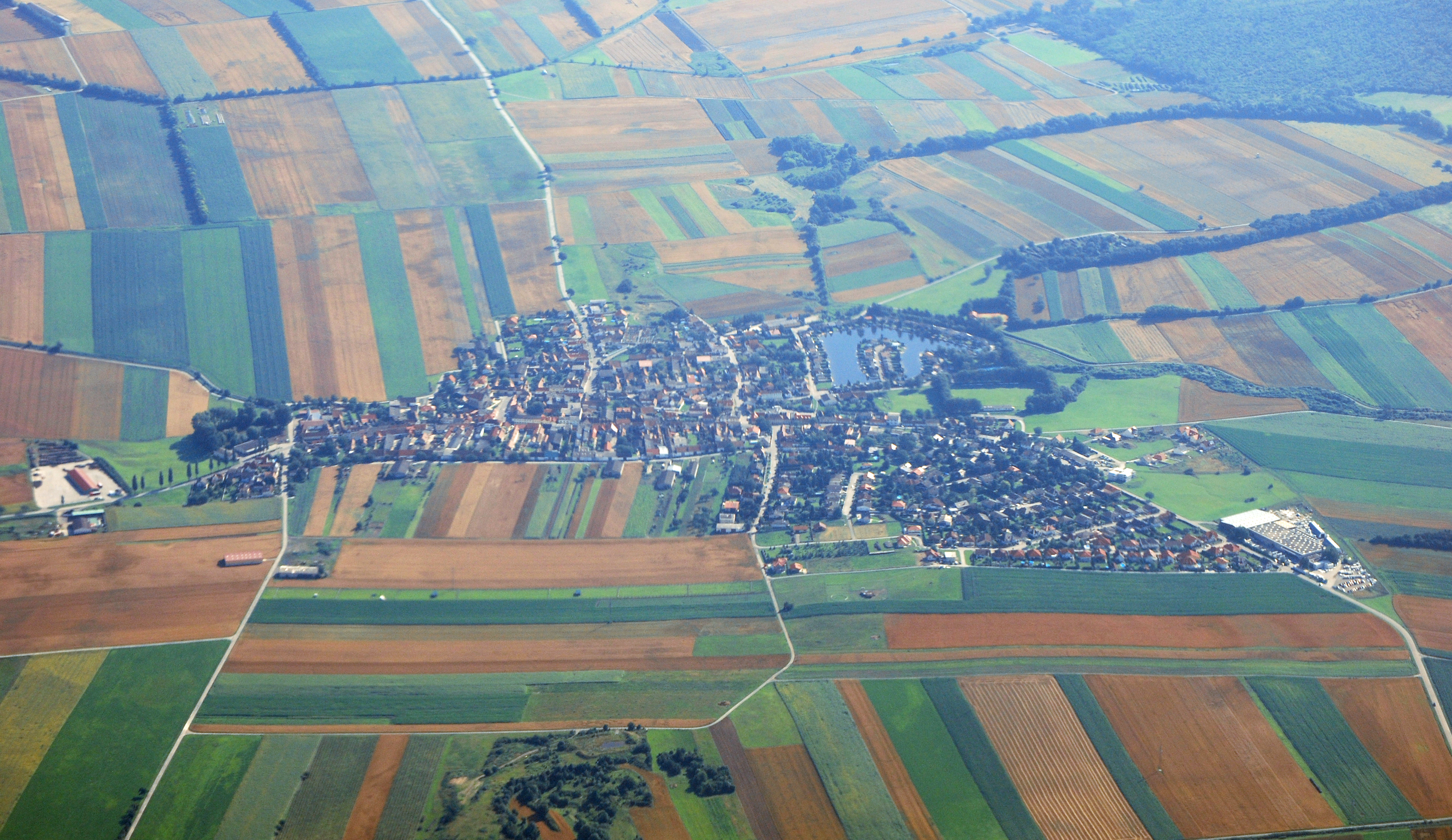
- Aerial view

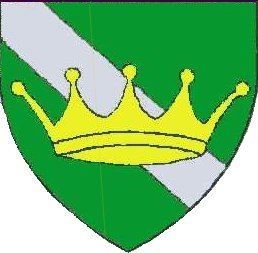
- Coat of arms

- Location within Austria
- Coordinates: 47°55′N 16°33′E
- Country: Austria
- State: Lower Austria
- District: Bruck an der Leitha

Government
  - Mayor: Reka Fekete (ÖVP)

Area
  - Total: 16.74 km^{2} (6.46 sq mi)
- Elevation: 211 m (692 ft)

Population (2018-01-01)
  - Total: 934
  - Density: 55.8/km^{2} (145/sq mi)
- Time zone: UTC+1 (CET)
  - Summer (DST): UTC+2 (CEST)
- Postal code: 2451
- Area code: 02168
- Website: www.au-am-leithaberge.at

Au am Leithaberge is a town in the district of Bruck an der Leitha in Lower Austria in Austria.

== Geography ==
Au am Leithaberge lies in the industrial area of Lower Austria on the western edge of the Leitha mountains. About 35.81 percent of the municipality is forested.
