= Haslau-Maria Ellend =

- Municipality
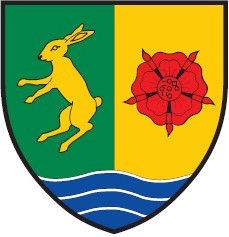
- Coat of arms

- Location within Austria
- Coordinates: 48°6′N 16°41′E
- Country: Austria
- State: Lower Austria
- District: Bruck an der Leitha

Government
  - Mayor: Helmut Fritz

Area
  - Total: 24.84 km^{2} (9.59 sq mi)
- Elevation: 186 m (610 ft)

Population (2018-01-01)
  - Total: 2,004
  - Density: 80.68/km^{2} (209.0/sq mi)
- Time zone: UTC+1 (CET)
  - Summer (DST): UTC+2 (CEST)
- Postal code: 2402
- Area code: 02232
- Website: www.haslau-mariaellend.at

Haslau-Maria Ellend is a municipality in the district of Bruck an der Leitha in Lower Austria in Austria.

== Geography ==
Haslau-Maria Ellend lies in the industrial area of Lower Austria. About 42 percent of the municipality is forested.
