= Heyperger family =

The Heyperger family were a burgher family in Austria (particularly in Tyrol and later Vienna) for several centuries.

The earliest known member of the family is Ulrich Heyperger (d. 1336), who owned several lucrative estates in Tyrol. His best known descendant is Leopold Heyperger, the Burggrave (Governor) of Hofburg Palace from 1547 to 1560 as well as Ferdinand I's treasurer. In 1482 the family were recognized as part of the ancient nobility. One member of the family, Karl Heyperger became the Lord of the town of Himberg am Wald in Lower Austria. Later members of the family such as Johann Martin Heyperger von Pankirchen (1730–1784), the Dean of Freistadt and Ferdinand von Heyberg und Pankirchen added "Pankirchen" to their surnames after a marriage between the Heyperger and Pankirchen families.
