= Cabinet of Curiosities in Dell' Historia Naturale =

1599 woodcut print by Ferrante Imperato

Cabinet of Curiosities in Dell'Historia Naturale
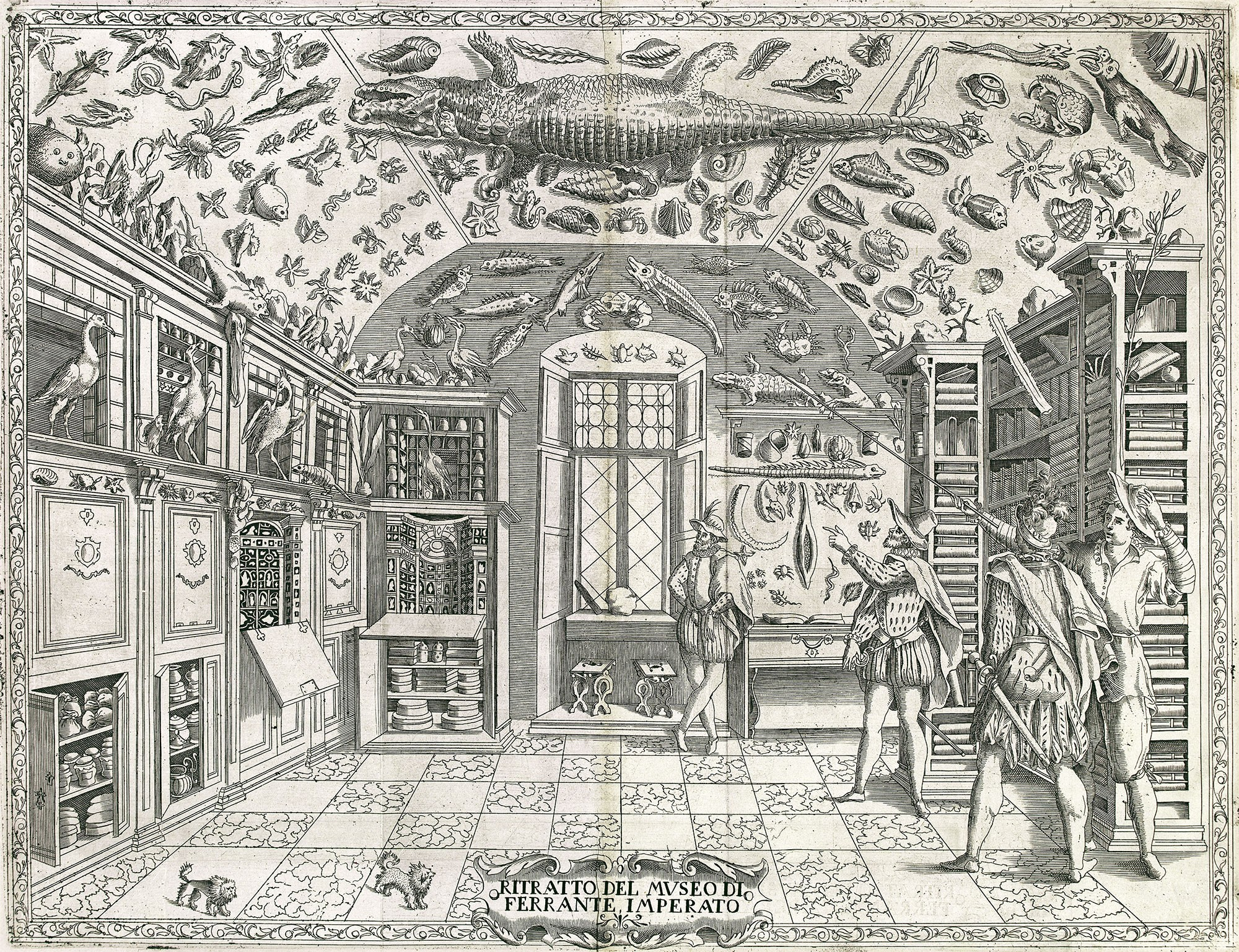
- Artist: Ferrante Imperato
- Year: 1599
- Medium: Fold out woodcut print
- Designation: Biodiversity Heritage Library

Cabinet of Curiosities in Dell'Historia Naturale depicts Ferrante Imperato's cabinet of curiosities. Imperato was an Italian apothecary and naturalist practicing in Naples during the 16th century. The image shows the types of objects Imperato collected for his cabinet of curiosities, including shells, animals, minerals, and botanic specimens. This print appeared in Historia naturale di Ferrante Imperato napolitano: nella quale ordinatamente si tratta della diversa condition di minere, pietre pretiose, & altre curiosità : con varie historie di piante, & animali, sin'hora non date in luce, otherwise known as Dell’Historia Naturale, a monumental work of natural history in 28 volumes. The exploration of natural history was part of the Renaissance humanist movement and empiricism. The use of senses to formulate new ideas and natural discoveries was at the heart of this movement. The discoveries resulting from empirical exploration were aimed at figuring out how everyone is connected through nature. Imperato's cabinet was part of this movement and provided a place for aristocrats in society to expand their knowledge.

== Visual description ==
This fold-out woodcut from the book Dell’Historia Naturale depicts a room full of collection of natural objects. There is an array of animals and botanical subjects shown in the room, all of which were collected by Imperato himself. On top of the image, there is a variety of aquatic animal species along with an array of shells. Many cabinets (right), brimming with books, most likely containing field notes of Imperato's examination of his biological discoveries, art historians assume these books include his biological discoveries because their titles refer to specific classes of species and there are reports of Imperato in the field with books and writing utensils. The image is very exact in the representation of objects. Fine lines allow for intricate details to be seen. The focal point of this print is the window in the center which leads the eye to the alligator. On the lower right of this image, there are four men examining this cabinet of wonders. The expressions on their faces display amazement and curiosity, and their body language suggests interest in the room itself. This type of cabinet of curiosity was very characteristic of the empirical scientific movement. There were collections of wonder cabinets around Europe that displayed objects from the natural world in a similar way.

== Background ==
Ferrante Imperato was the creator of this cabinet of wonders depicted in this print. Imperato was an apothecary and a collector of natural objects. He lived from 1525 to 1615 and was mainly known for the publication of Dell’Historia Naturale. This publication included 28 volumes, all describing and depicting his discoveries and their importance. The majority of the volumes examined minerals, gems, and stones, but this image indicated that later volumes focused on animal and botanical subjects in his room of curiosities. It was Imperato's son, Francesco Imperato, who convinced him to publish the series. This allowed for more people to share in Imperato's collection and research into the natural world. Imperato published this work in 1599 in Naples, Italy. It served as an educational source for aristocrats and individuals of higher status in society.

== Curiosity cabinets ==
This type of print represents Renaissance humanist interest in the idea that everyone was connected to and through nature. This scientific movement, empiricism, re-examined previous ideas about what it meant to be human and a part of nature. It questioned what moral and civic involvement should look like in citizens and how individuals should act as participants in society. As a result, there was an increase in exploration of nature through scientific methods. Apothecaries, like Ferranto Imperte, collected natural objects such as animals, botanicals, and minerals as a way to experiment and draw conclusions about the physical world. Imperato, through his investigations, found new species of animals, such as the Salamandre terrestri. When examining what it meant to be human, Renaissance humanists placed heavy emphasis on an individual's moral and ethical agency, along with stressing the importance of using critical reasoning to examine the natural world. Through improving these calculated and curiosity centered ways of looking at the world, it was thought that an individual could discover their individual purpose in society. This helped fuel the surge of curiosity cabinets because as scientific exploration was encouraged, more discoveries were found and people wanted to share their knowledge with other academics. Often referred to by many different titles such as "wunderkammer", meaning wonder chamber, or "cabinet of wonders", there were many variations of these collections. Each one was centered around discovery of nature or other objects that facilitated a curiosity of the natural world.
