= Medical oddity =

Unusual event in a medical context

A medical oddity is an unusual predicament or event which takes place in a medical context. Some examples of medical oddities might include: "lost and found" surgical instruments (in the body), grotesquely oversized tumors, (human) male pregnancy, rare or "orphan" illnesses, rare allergies (such as to water), strange births (extra or missing organs), and bizarre syndromes (such as Capgras delusion).

Medical oddities can also include unusual discoveries in purchased food, such as finding a severed finger or thumb in a hamburger.

Medical oddities are also known as medical curiosities. While not strictly paranormal, they are classically Fortean.

== See also ==
- Cabinet of curiosities
