= Philipp Hainhofer =

German banker and diplomat

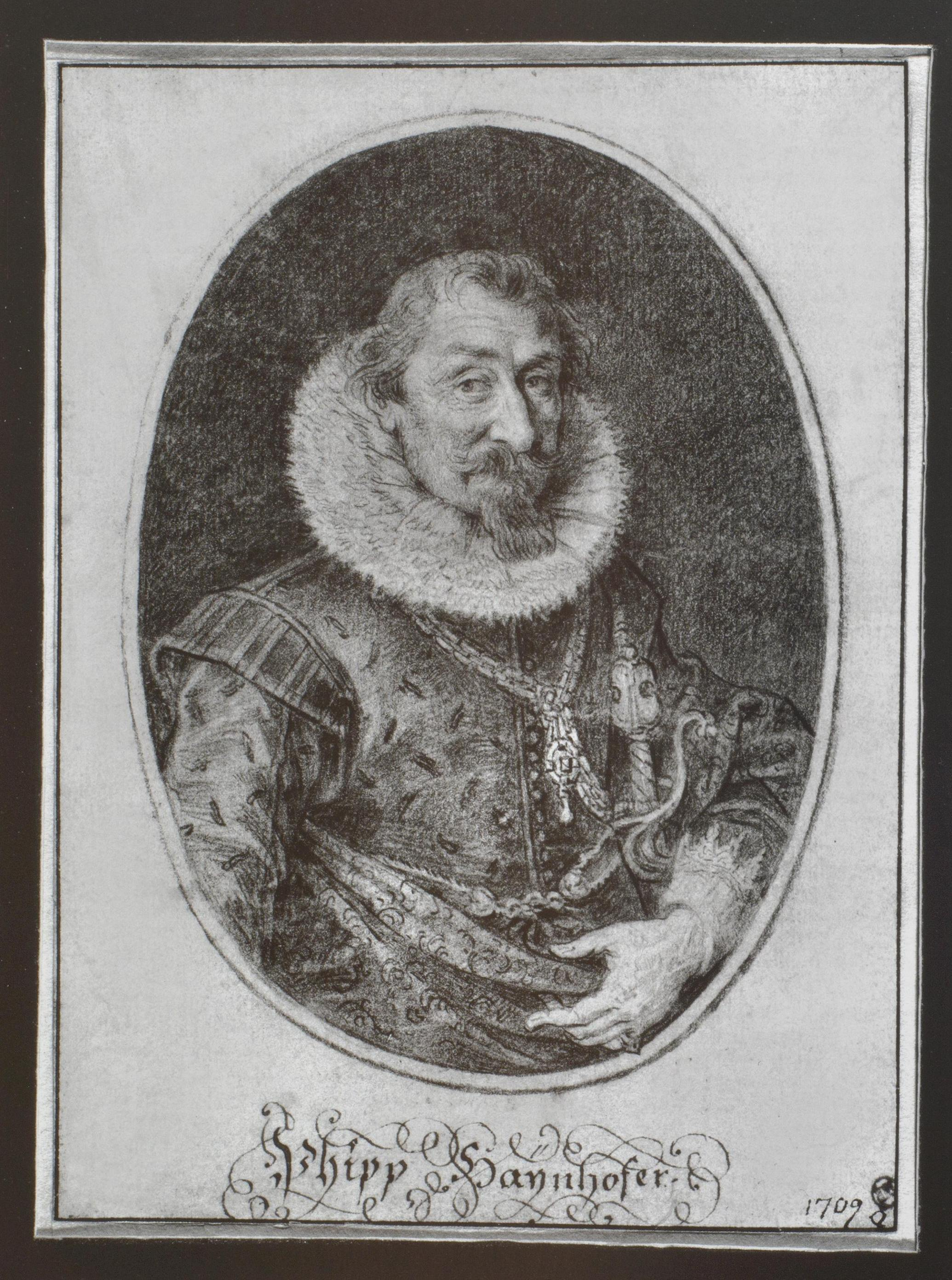
Hainhofer

Philipp Hainhofer (21 July 1578 – 1647) was a merchant, banker, diplomat and art collector in Augsburg. He is remembered, among other things, for the curiosity cabinets (Kunstschränke) which he created with the assistance of a large number of Augsburg artisans.

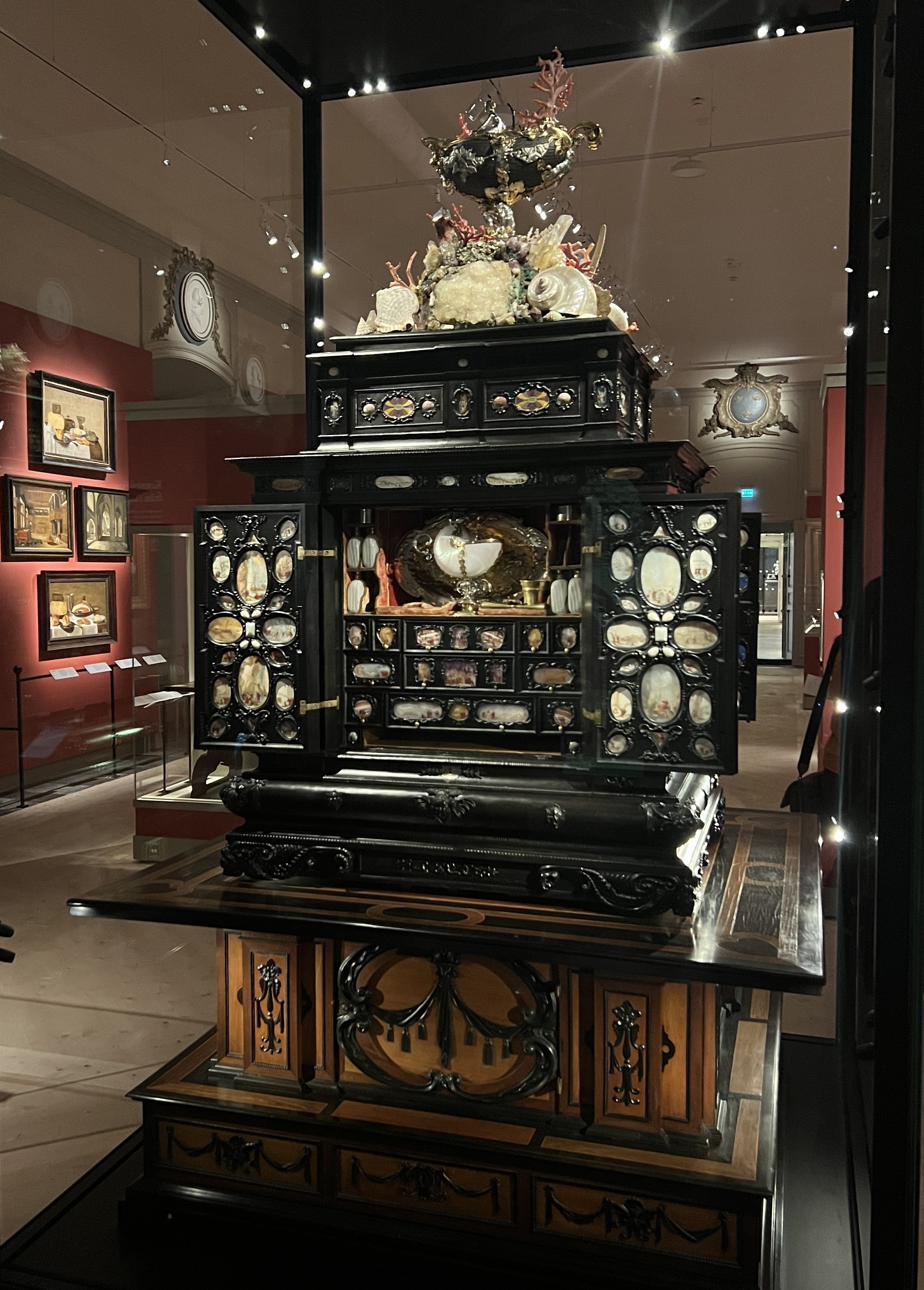
The so called Augsburg Art Cabinet donated to king Gustavus Adolphus of Sweden, now part of the Uppsala university museum collection in Gustavianum.

Hainhofer studied law at the Universities of Siena and Padua, traveled through Italy, Germany and the Netherlands, and acquired a good knowledge of art and several languages. He was elected to the senate of Augsburg in 1605 and was chosen as political correspondent in the city by the King of France, the Margrave of Baden and Duke Philip II of Pomerania. The last of these was of particular significance and Hainhofer acted as an agent for the Duke in acquiring art and objects for a Kunstkammer (curiosity chamber), and in composing the famous so-called Pommerscher Kunstschrank (Pomeranian curiosity cabinet), which was made c.1610-1617 and personally delivered to the Duke by Hainhofer in 1617. The body of the cabinet was destroyed in a fire during Berlin bombing campaign at the end of World War II. He is also known for building the first cuckoo clock in Black Forest, Germany.

Philip of Pomerania and other princes used Hainhofer for various diplomatic missions and the contacts Hainhofer made on his journeys also served to develop his business as an art agent, and he produced additional curiosity cabinets. In 1632, one was presented by Hainhofer on behalf of the City of Augsburg to King Gustavus Adolphus of Sweden. This cabinet, which is the best preserved of Hainhofer's Kunstschränke, is on display in the Museum Gustavianum of the University of Uppsala. Another one, made for Augustus, Duke of Brunswick-Lüneburg, is preserved in the Rijksmuseum in Amsterdam. Hainhofer also compiled an album amicorum containing signatures of many great names from across Europe which became known as Das Große Stammbuch and was eventually acquired by the Herzog August Library in Wolfenbüttel.
