= Leopold Heyperger =

16th-century Viennese burgher

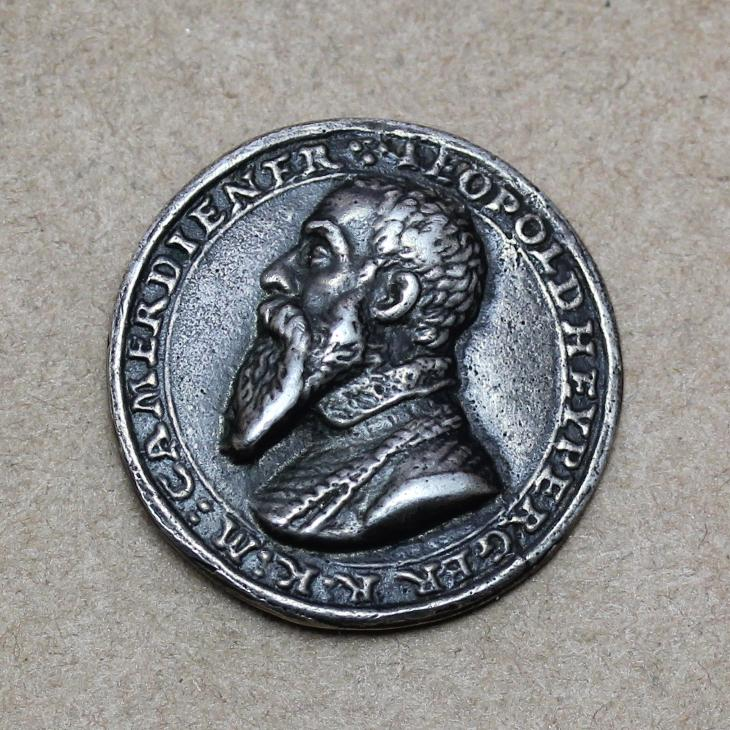
- Bust of Leopold Heyperger on a coin from the Hofburg Palace (c. 1550)
- Title: Burggrave of Hofburg Palace (1547–1560)
- Predecessor: Burgvogt Joachim von Thalheim (1538–1547); Administrator of Burggrave Christo Aichstetter (1541–1552)
- Successor: Burggrave Veit Schärdinger (1560–1572)
- Family: Heyperger family

Leopold Heyperger was a 16th-century Viennese burgher who was the Burggrave of Hofburg Palace from 1547 to 1560, as well as Ferdinand I's treasurer. He was personally appointed to be the administrator of the imperial Kunstkammer in Hofburg Palace. He is best known for organizing a vast collection of ancient Roman coins for the Kunstkammer in 1547.

== See also ==
- The Heyperger Family
