= Himberg =

- Municipality
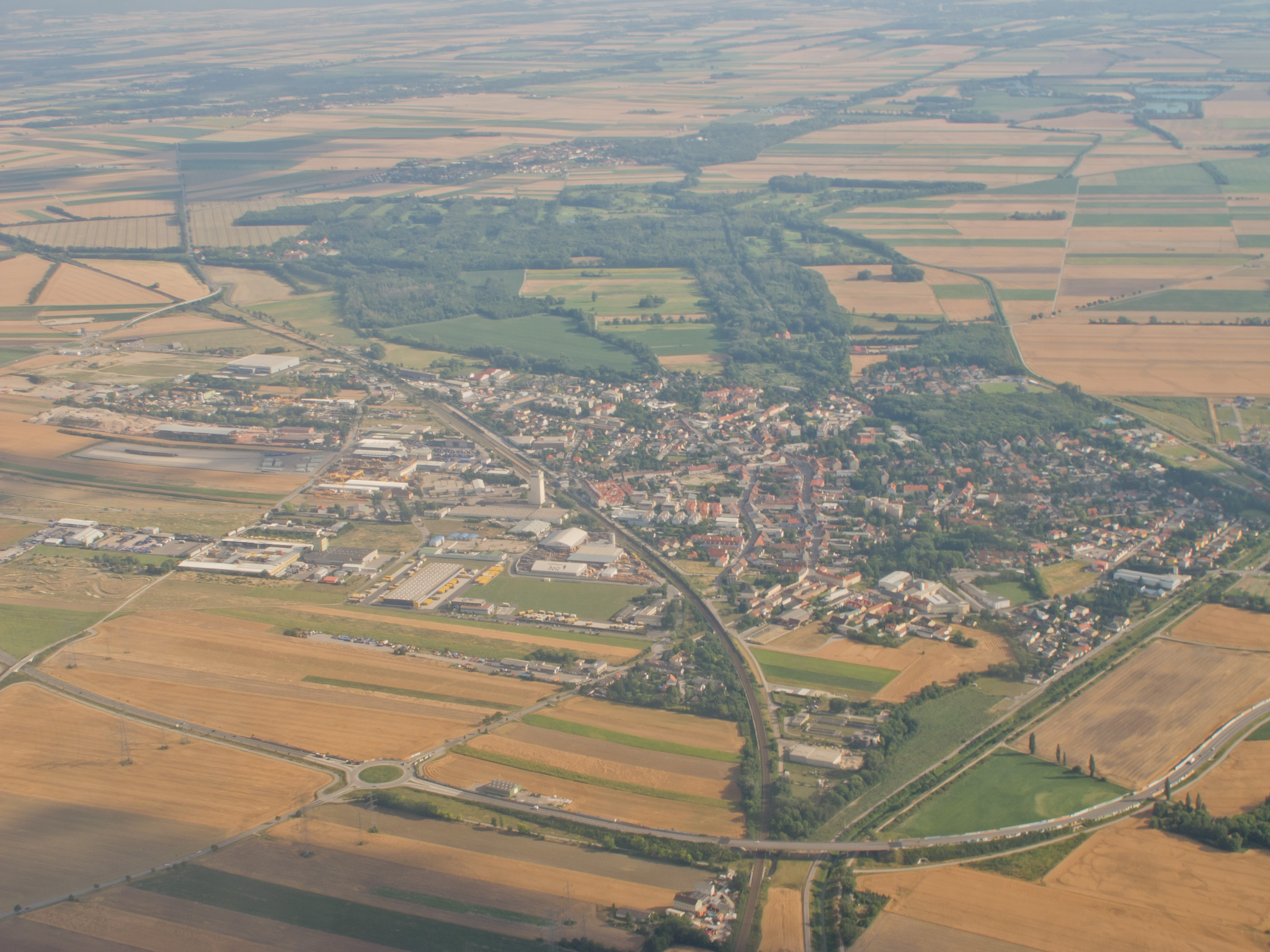
- Aerial view

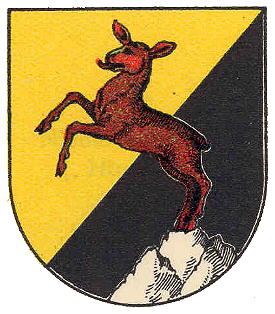
- Coat of arms

- Location within Austria
- Coordinates: 48°04′00″N 16°26′00″E
- Country: Austria
- State: Lower Austria
- District: Bruck an der Leitha

Government
  - Mayor: Ernst Wendl (SPÖ)

Area
  - Total: 47.64 km^{2} (18.39 sq mi)
- Elevation: 172 m (564 ft)

Population (2018-01-01)
  - Total: 7,375
  - Density: 154.8/km^{2} (400.9/sq mi)
- Time zone: UTC+1 (CET)
  - Summer (DST): UTC+2 (CEST)
- Postal code: 2325
- Area code: 02235, 02234 (Velm)
- Vehicle registration: BL
- Website: www.gemeinde-himberg.at

Himberg bei Wien (German pronunciation: [ˈhɪmˌbeɐk]) is a municipality in the district of Bruck an der Leitha in the Austrian state of Lower Austria.

It belonged to Wien-Umgebung District which was dissolved in 2016.

It used to be a holding of the Heyperger family.

== Population ==
Historical population
Year	Pop.	±%
1971	4,614	—
1981	4,981	+8.0%
1991	5,173	+3.9%
2001	5,423	+4.8%
2011	6,543	+20.7%
2021	7,569	+15.7%
