= Cabinet of curiosities =

Collection of notable objects

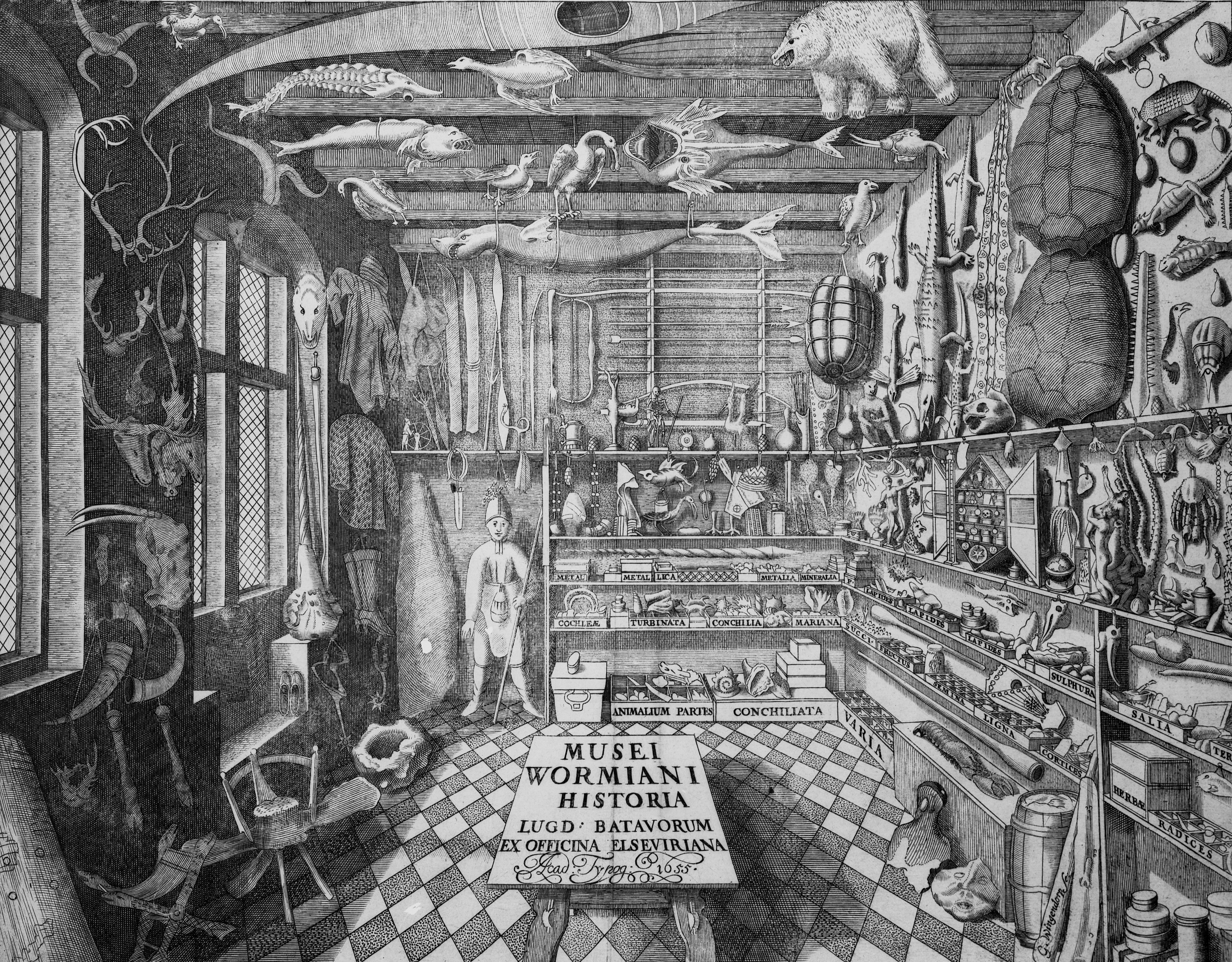
"Musei Wormiani Historia", the frontispiece from the Museum Wormianum depicting Ole Worm's cabinet of curiosities

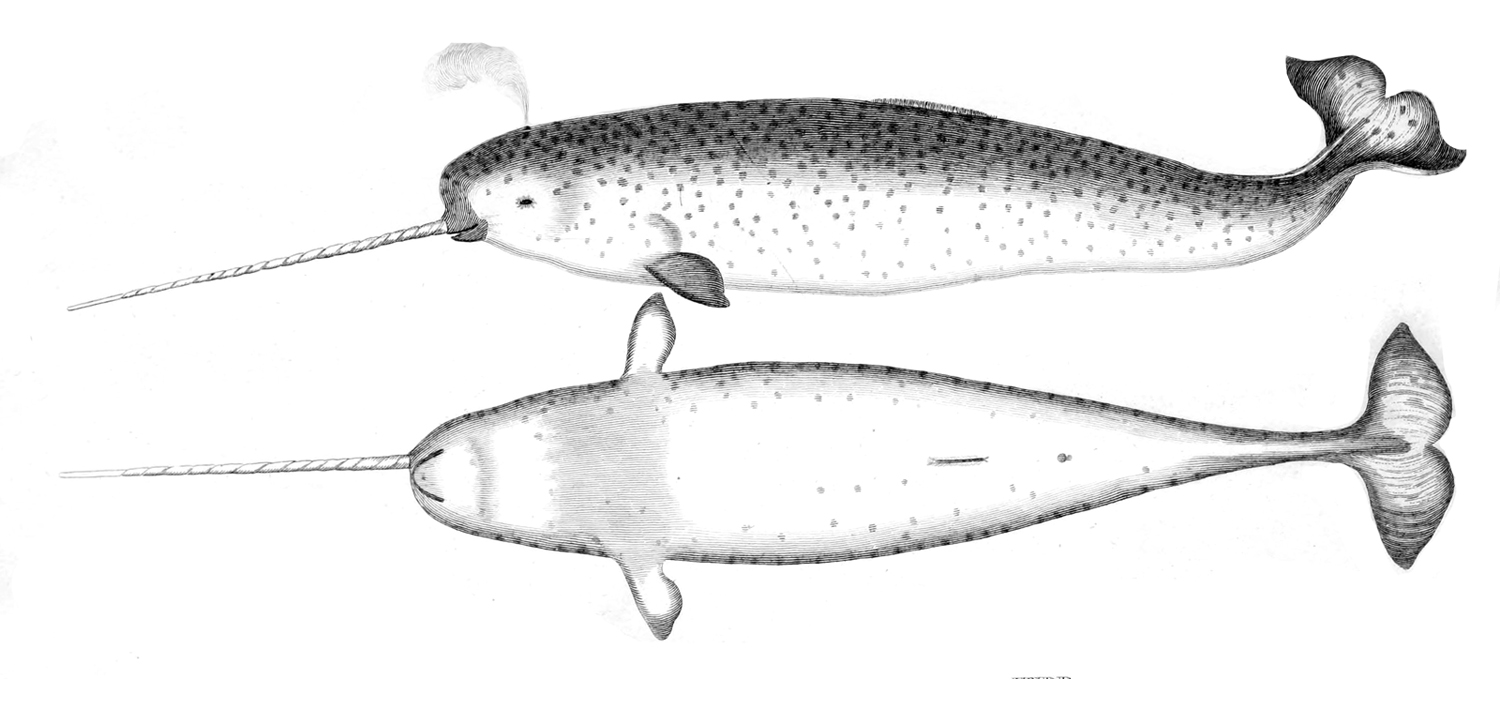
A male Narwhal, whose tusk, as a unicorn horn, was a common piece in cabinets

Cabinets of curiosities (German: Kunstkammer [ˈkʊnstˌkamɐ] and Kunstkabinett [ˈkʊnstkabiˌnɛt]), also known as wonder-rooms (German: Wunderkammer [ˈvʊndɐˌkamɐ]), were encyclopedic collections of objects whose categorical boundaries were, in Renaissance Europe, yet to be defined. Although more rudimentary collections had preceded them, the classic cabinets of curiosities emerged in the sixteenth century. The term cabinet originally described a room rather than a piece of furniture. Modern terminology would categorize the objects included as belonging to natural history (sometimes faked), geology, ethnography, archaeology, religious or historical relics, works of art (including cabinet paintings), and antiquities. In addition to the most famous and best documented cabinets of rulers and aristocrats, members of the merchant class and early practitioners of science in Europe formed collections that were precursors to museums.

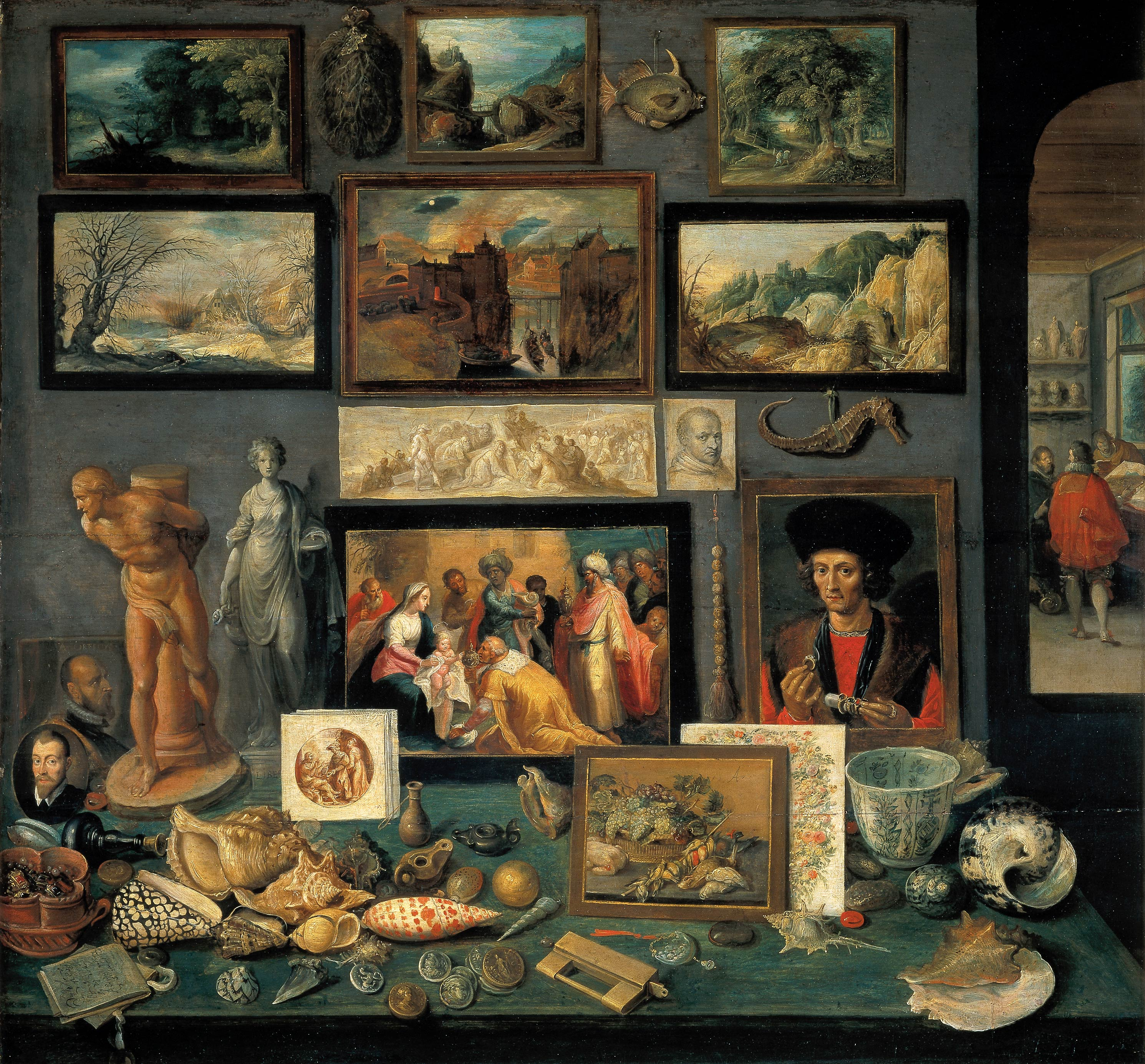
A corner of a cabinet, painted by Frans II Francken in 1636, reveals the range of connoisseurship of a Baroque-era virtuoso.

Cabinets of curiosities served not only as collections to reflect the particular interests of their curators but also as social devices to establish and uphold rank in society. There are said to be two main types of cabinets. As R. J. W. Evans notes, there could be "the princely cabinet, serving a largely representational function, and dominated by aesthetic concerns and a marked predilection for the exotic," or the less grandiose, "the more modest collection of the humanist scholar or virtuoso, which served more practical and scientific purposes." Evans goes on to explain that "no clear distinction existed between the two categories: all collecting was marked by curiosity, shading into credulity, and by some sort of universal underlying design".

In addition to cabinets of curiosity serving as an establisher of socioeconomic status for its curator, these cabinets served as entertainment, as particularly illustrated by the proceedings of the Royal Society, whose early meetings were often a sort of open floor to any Fellow to exhibit the findings his curiosities led him to. However purely educational or investigative these exhibitions may sound, the Fellows in this period supported the idea of "learned entertainment," or the alignment of learning with entertainment. This was not unusual, as the Royal Society had an earlier history of a love of the marvellous. This love was often exploited by eighteenth-century natural philosophers to secure the attention of their audience during their exhibitions.

== History ==
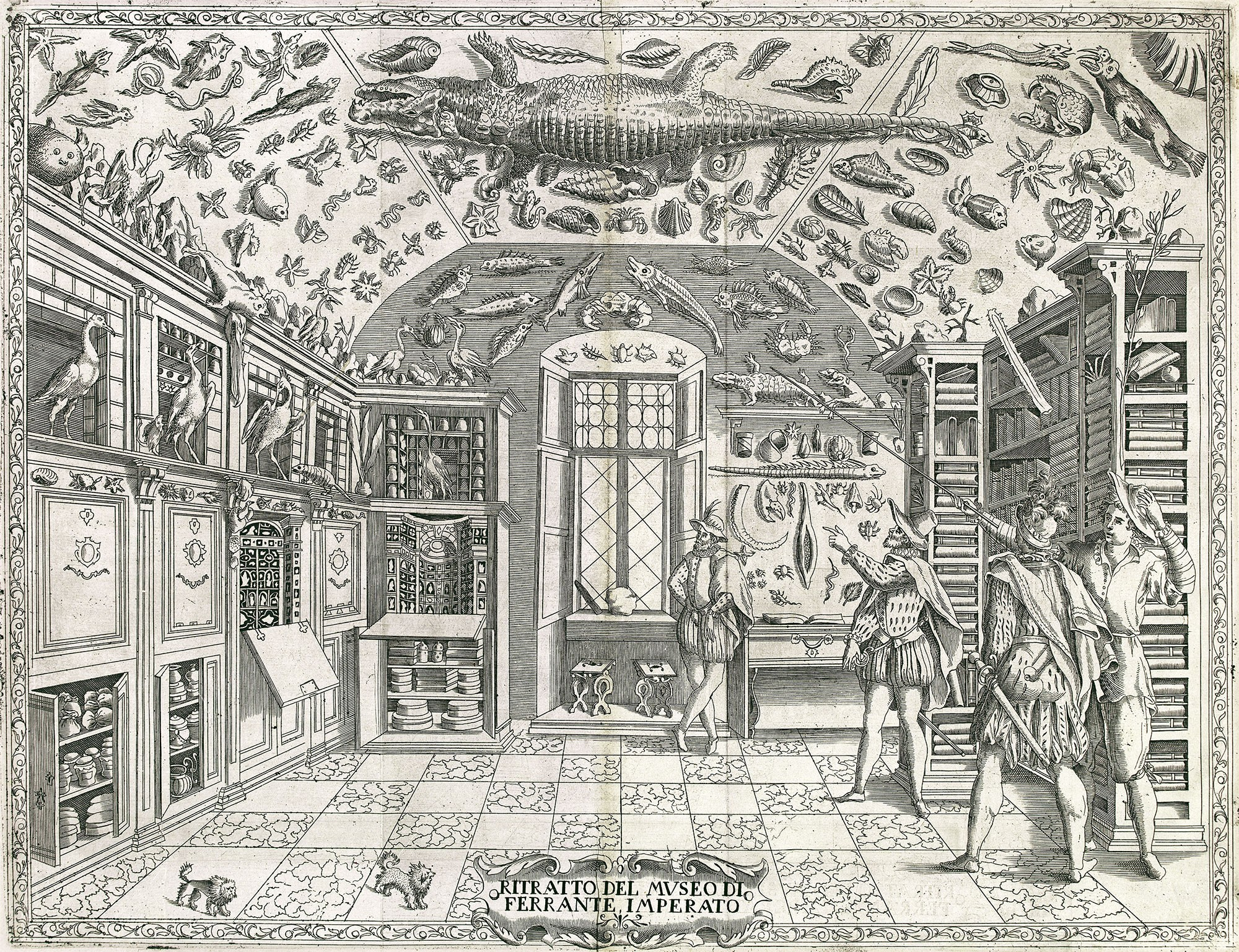
Fold-out engraving from Ferrante Imperato's Dell'Historia Naturale (Naples 1599), the earliest illustration of a natural history cabinet

=== To c. 1600 ===
The earliest pictorial record of a natural history cabinet is the engraving in Ferrante Imperato's Dell'Historia Naturale (Naples 1599) (illustration). It serves to authenticate its author's credibility as a source of natural history information, by showing his open bookcases (at the right), in which many volumes are stored lying down and stacked, in the medieval fashion, or with their spines upward, to protect the pages from dust. Some of the volumes doubtless represent his herbarium. Every surface of the vaulted ceiling is occupied with preserved fishes, stuffed mammals and curious shells, with a stuffed crocodile suspended in the centre. Examples of corals stand on the bookcases. At the left, the room is fitted out like a studiolo with a range of built-in cabinets whose fronts can be unlocked and let down to reveal intricately fitted nests of pigeonholes forming architectural units, filled with small mineral specimens. Above them, stuffed birds stand against panels inlaid with square polished stone samples, doubtless marbles and jaspers or fitted with pigeonhole compartments for specimens. Below them, a range of cupboards contain specimen boxes and covered jars.

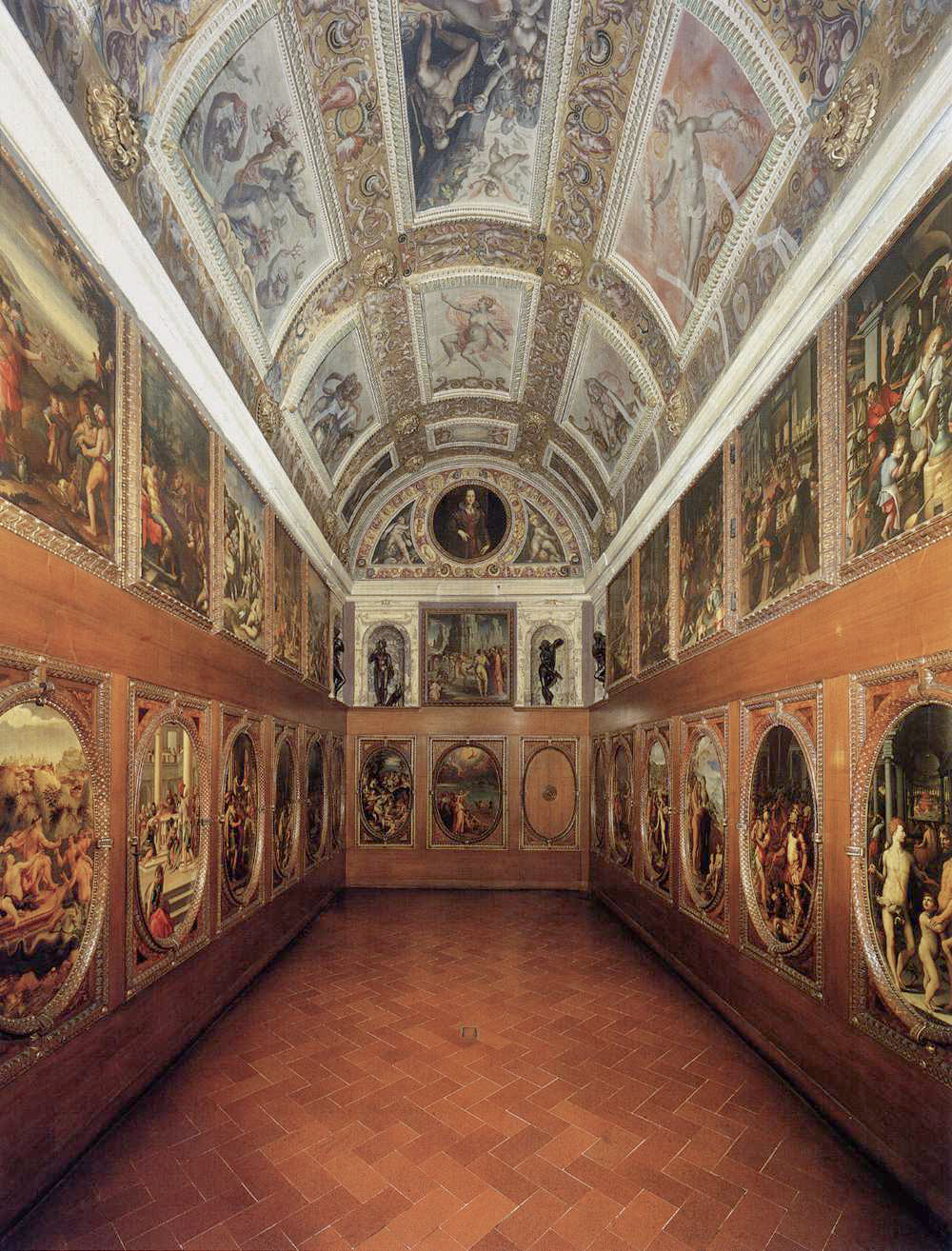
The richly decorated vault of the Studiolo of Francesco I in Palazzo Vecchio, Florence

In 1587 Gabriel Kaltemarckt advised Christian I of Saxony that three types of items were indispensable in forming a "Kunstkammer" or art collection: firstly sculptures and paintings; secondly "curious items from home or abroad"; and thirdly "antlers, horns, claws, feathers and other things belonging to strange and curious animals". When Albrecht Dürer visited the Netherlands in 1521, apart from artworks he sent back to Nuremberg various animal horns, a piece of coral, some large fish fins and a wooden weapon from the East Indies.

The highly characteristic range of interests represented in Frans II Francken's painting of 1636 (illustration, above) shows paintings on the wall that range from landscapes, including a moonlit scene—a genre in itself—to a portrait and a religious picture (the Adoration of the Magi) intermixed with preserved tropical marine fish and a string of carved beads, most likely amber, which is both precious and a natural curiosity. Sculptures both classical and secular (the sacrificing Libera, a Roman fertility goddess) on the one hand and modern and religious (Christ at the Column) are represented, while on the table are ranged, among the exotic shells (including some tropical ones and a shark's tooth): portrait miniatures, gem-stones mounted with pearls in a curious quatrefoil box, a set of sepia chiaroscuro woodcuts or drawings, and a small still-life painting leaning against a flower-piece, coins and medals—presumably Greek and Roman—and Roman terracotta oil-lamps, a Chinese-style brass lock, curious flasks, and a blue-and-white Ming porcelain bowl.

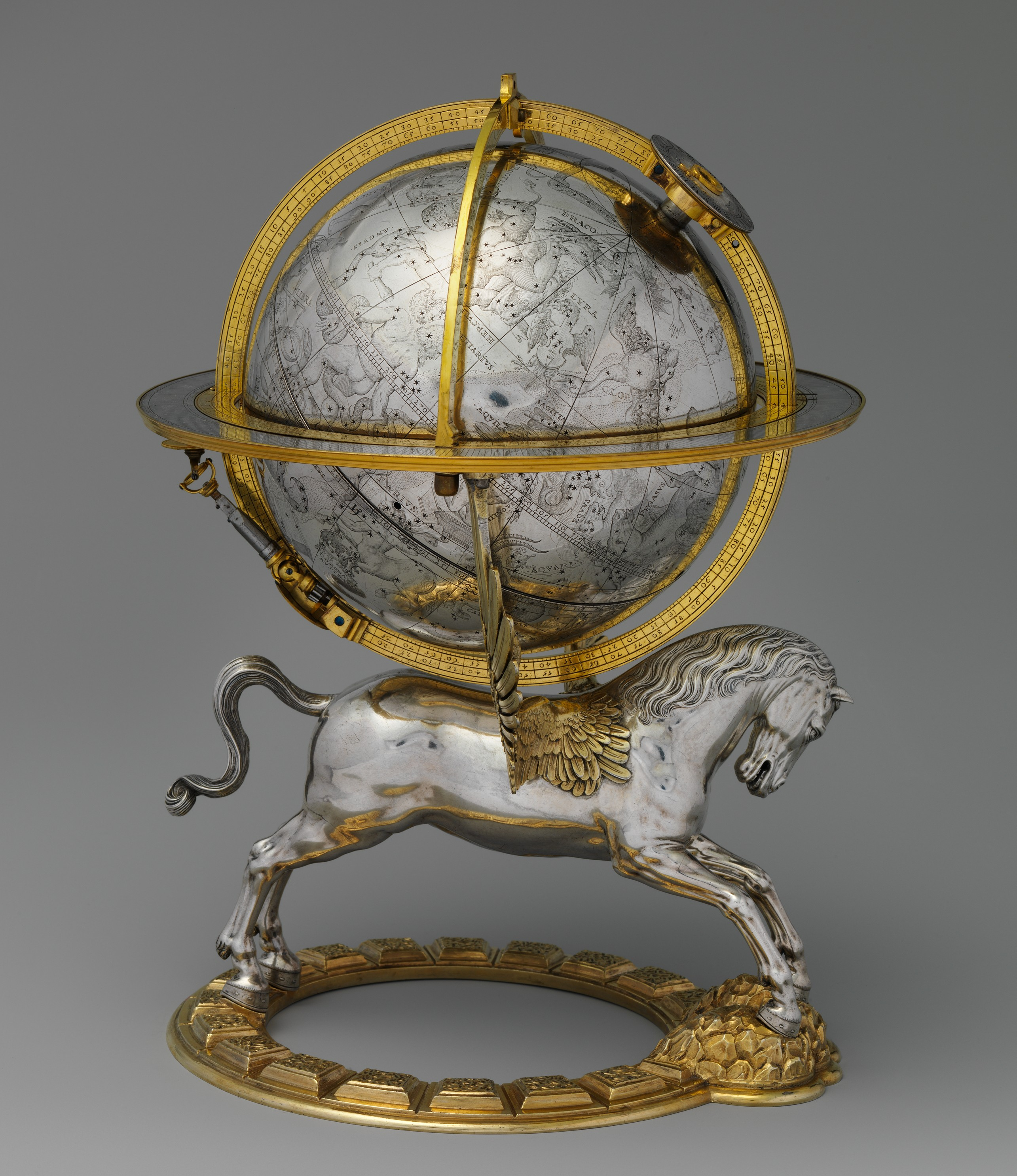
Celestial globe with clockwork, made for the Kunstkammer of Rudolf II, 1579

The Kunstkammer of Rudolf II, Holy Roman Emperor (ruled 1576–1612), housed in the Hradschin at Prague, was unrivalled north of the Alps; it provided solace and retreat for contemplation that also served to demonstrate his imperial magnificence and power in the symbolic arrangement of their display, ceremoniously presented to visiting diplomats and magnates.

Rudolf's uncle, Ferdinand II, Archduke of Austria, also had a collection, organized by his treasurer, Leopold Heyperger, which put special emphasis on paintings of people with interesting deformities, which remains largely intact as the Chamber of Art and Curiosities at Ambras Castle in Austria. "The Kunstkammer was regarded as a microcosm or theater of the world, and a memory theater. The Kunstkammer conveyed symbolically the patron's control of the world through its indoor, microscopic reproduction." Of Charles I of England's collection, Peter Thomas states succinctly, "The Kunstkabinett itself was a form of propaganda."

=== 17th century ===
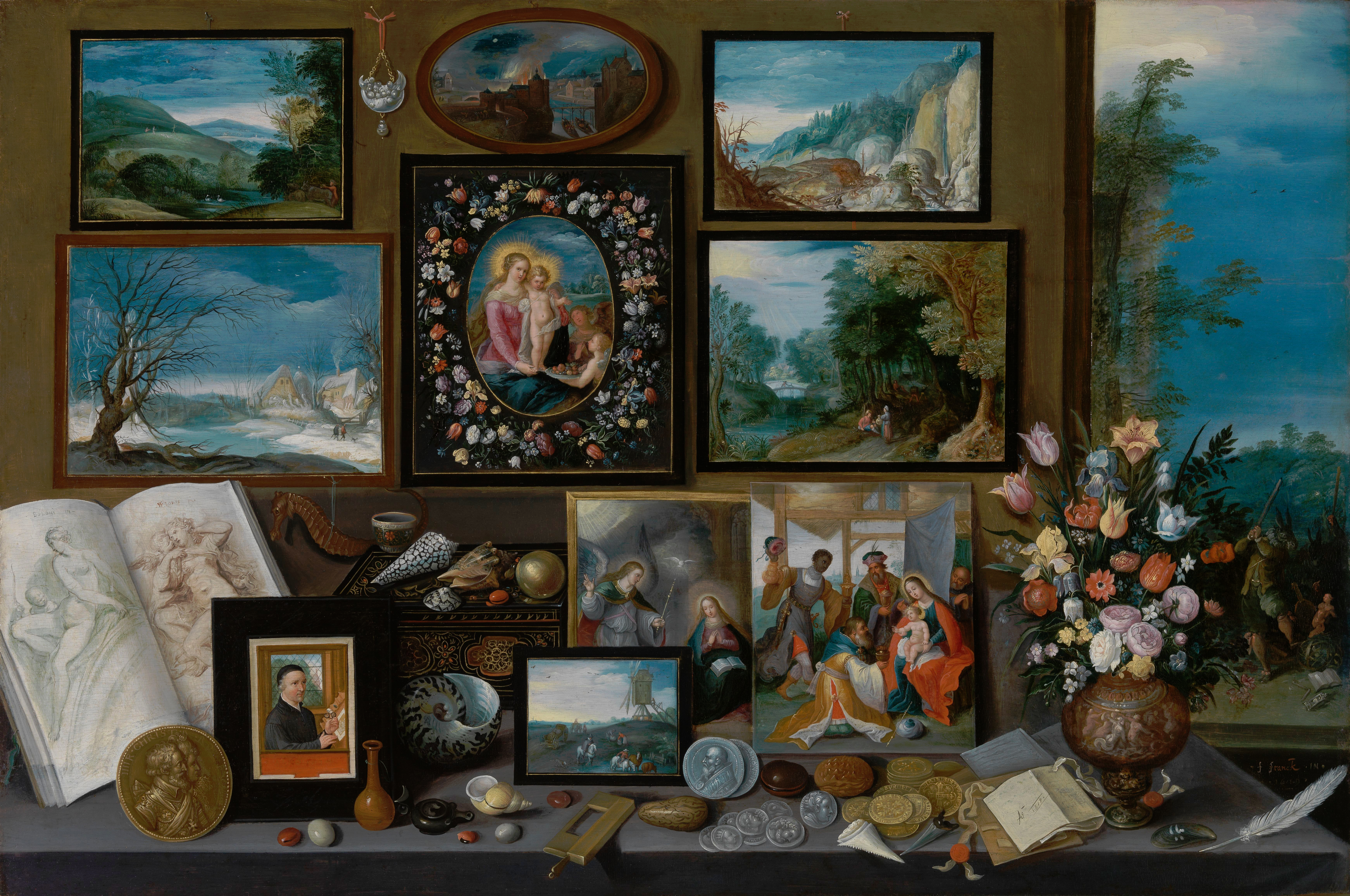
Frans Francken the Younger, The cabinet of a collector with paintings, shells, coins, fossils and flowers, 1619

Two of the most famously described seventeenth-century cabinets were those of Ole Worm, known as Olaus Wormius (1588–1654) (illustration, above right), and Athanasius Kircher (1602–1680). These seventeenth-century cabinets were filled with preserved animals, horns, tusks, skeletons, minerals, as well as other interesting man-made objects: sculptures wondrously old, wondrously fine or wondrously small; clockwork automata; ethnographic specimens from exotic locations. Often they would contain a mix of fact and fiction, including apparently mythical creatures. Worm's collection contained, for example, what he thought was a Scythian Lamb, a woolly fern thought to be a plant/sheep fabulous creature. However he was also responsible for identifying the narwhal's tusk as coming from a whale rather than a unicorn, as most owners of these believed. The specimens displayed were often collected during exploring expeditions and trading voyages.

Cabinets of curiosities would often serve scientific advancement when images of their contents were published. The catalog of Worm's collection, published as the Museum Wormianum (1655), used the collection of artifacts as a starting point for Worm's speculations on philosophy, science, natural history, and more.

Cabinets of curiosities were limited to those who could afford to create and maintain them. Many monarchs, in particular, developed large collections. A rather under-used example, stronger in art than other areas, was the Studiolo of Francesco I, the first Medici Grand-Duke of Tuscany. Frederick III of Denmark, who added Worm's collection to his own after Worm's death, was another such monarch. A third example is the Kunstkamera founded by Peter the Great in Saint Petersburg in 1714. Many items were bought in Amsterdam from Albertus Seba and Frederik Ruysch. The fabulous Habsburg Imperial collection included important Aztec artifacts, including the feather head-dress or crown of Montezuma now in the Museum of Ethnology, Vienna.

Similar collections on a smaller scale were the complex Kunstschränke produced in the early seventeenth century by the Augsburg merchant, diplomat and collector Philipp Hainhofer. These were cabinets in the sense of pieces of furniture, made from all imaginable exotic and expensive materials and filled with contents and ornamental details intended to reflect the entire cosmos on a miniature scale. The best preserved example is the one given by the city of Augsburg to King Gustavus Adolphus of Sweden in 1632, which is kept in the Museum Gustavianum in Uppsala. The curio cabinet, as a modern single piece of furniture, is a version of the grander historical examples.

The juxtaposition of such disparate objects, according to Horst Bredekamp's analysis (Bredekamp 1995), encouraged comparisons, finding analogies and parallels and favoured the cultural change from a world viewed as static to a dynamic view of endlessly transforming natural history and a historical perspective that led in the seventeenth century to the germs of a scientific view of reality.

=== 18th century and after ===
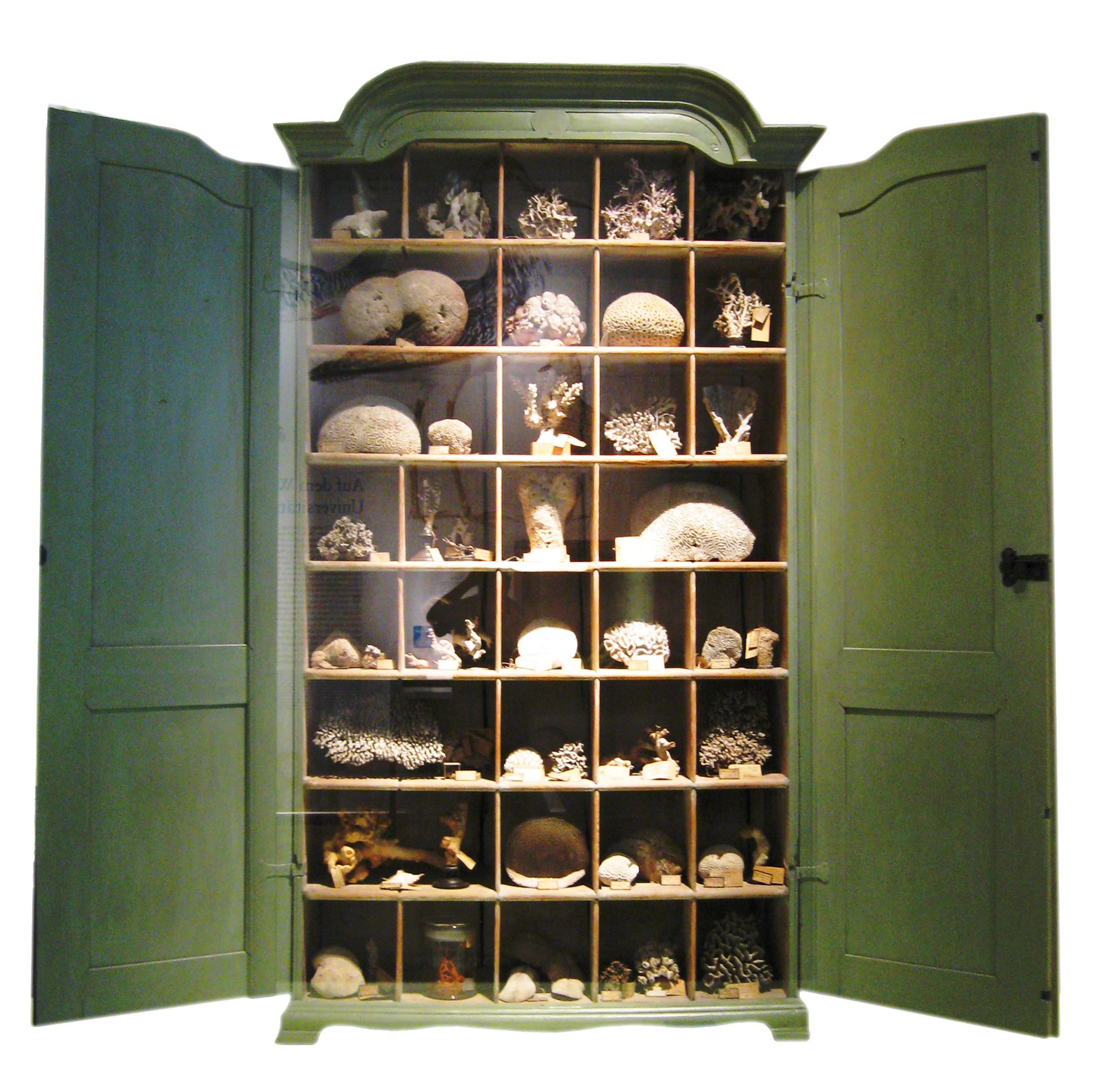
An early eighteenth-century German Schrank with a traditional display of corals (Naturkundenmuseum, Berlin)

In seventeenth-century parlance, both French and English, a cabinet came to signify a collection of works of art, which might still also include an assembly of objects of virtù or curiosities, such as a virtuoso would find intellectually stimulating. In 1714, Michael Bernhard Valentini published an early museological work, Museum Museorum, an account of the cabinets known to him with catalogues of their contents.

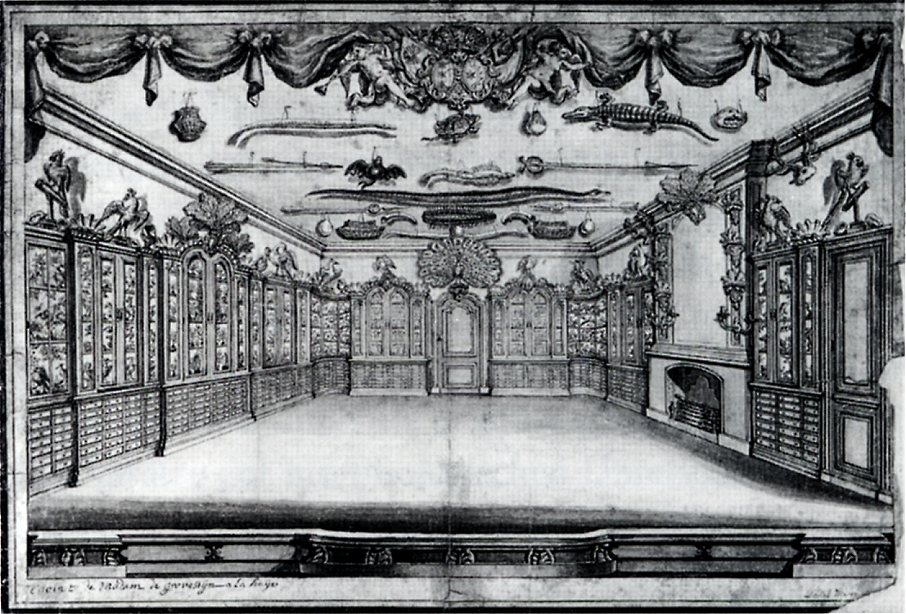
A Dutch cabinet, 1756

In the second half of the eighteenth century, Belsazar Hacquet (c. 1735 – 1815) operated in Ljubljana, then the capital of Carniola, a natural history cabinet (German: Naturalienkabinet) that was appreciated throughout Europe and was visited by the highest nobility, including the Holy Roman Emperor, Joseph II, the Russian grand duke Paul and Pope Pius VI, as well as by famous naturalists, such as Francesco Griselini and Franz Benedikt Hermann. It included a number of minerals, including specimens of mercury from the Idrija mine, a herbarium vivum with over 4,000 specimens of Carniolan and foreign plants, a smaller number of animal specimens, a natural history and medical library, and an anatomical theatre.

A late example of the juxtaposition of natural materials with richly worked artifice is provided by the "Green Vaults" formed by Augustus the Strong in Dresden to display his chamber of wonders. The "Enlightenment Gallery" in the British Museum, installed in the former "Kings Library" room in 2003 to celebrate the 250th anniversary of the museum, aims to recreate the abundance and diversity that still characterized museums in the mid-eighteenth century, mixing shells, rock samples and botanical specimens with a great variety of artworks and other man-made objects from all over the world.

Some strands of the early universal collections, the bizarre or freakish biological specimens, whether genuine or fake, and the more exotic historical objects, could find a home in commercial freak shows and sideshows.

=== England ===
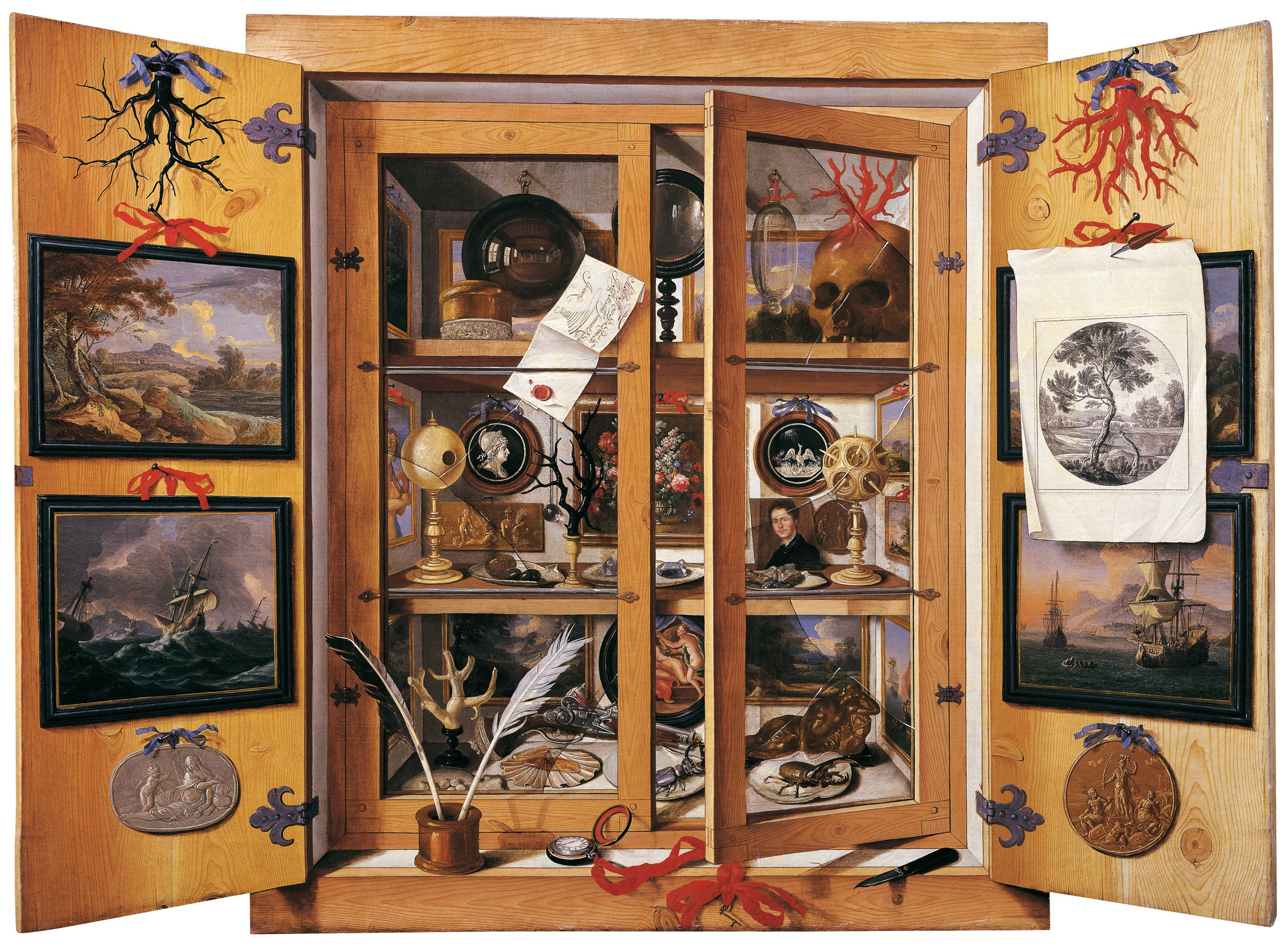
Cabinet of Curiosities, 1690s, Domenico Remps

In 1671, when visiting Thomas Browne (1605–1682), the courtier John Evelyn remarked,

His whole house and garden is a paradise and Cabinet of rarities and that of the best collection, amongst Medails, books, Plants, natural things.

Late in his life Browne parodied the rising trend of collecting curiosities in his tract Musaeum Clausum, an inventory of dubious, rumoured and non-existent books, pictures and objects.

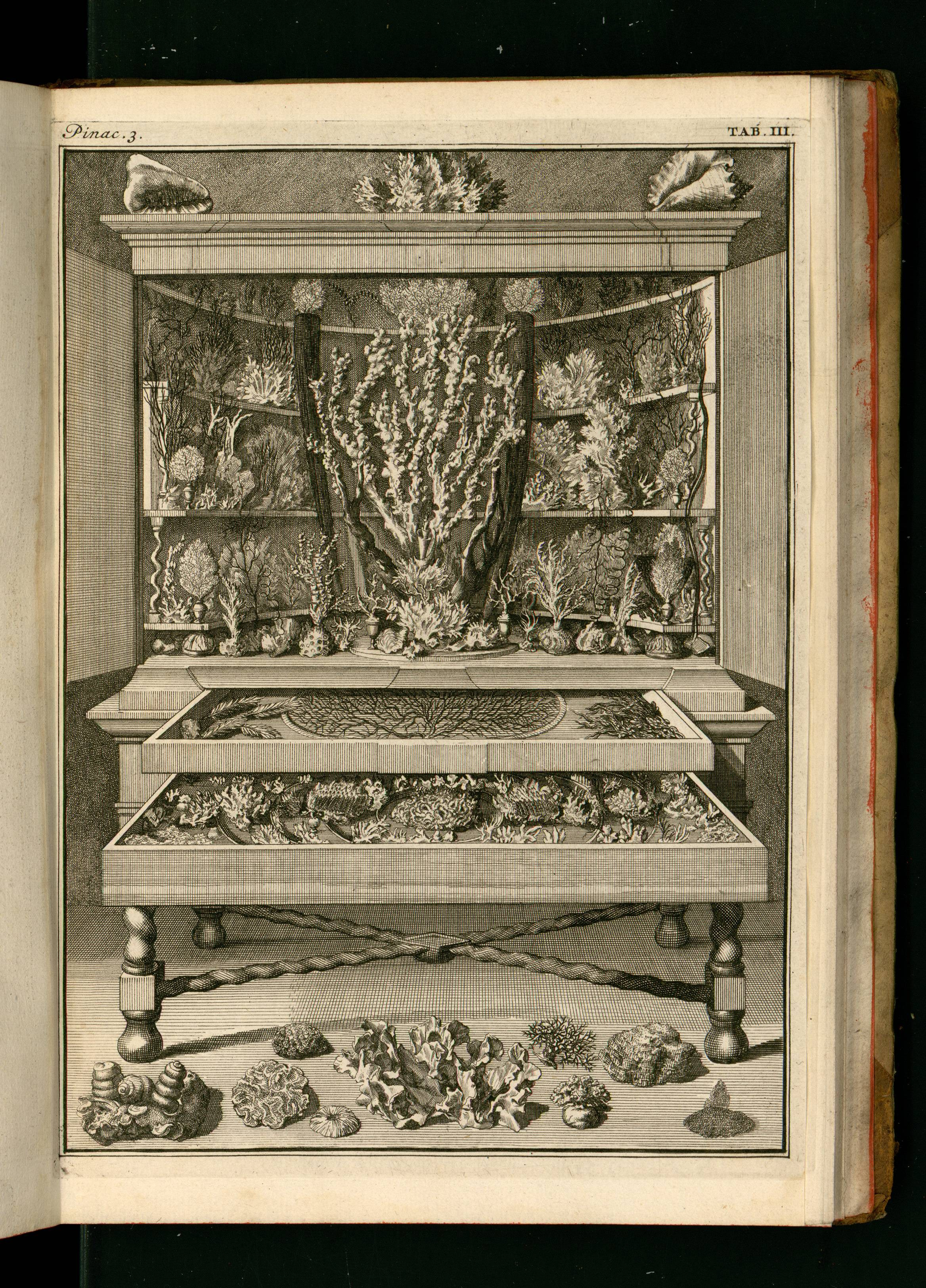
Levinus Vincent, 1715, plate from Wondertooneel der natuur, the lavish published catalogue of this Dutch merchant's collection

Sir Hans Sloane (1660–1753) an English physician, member of the Royal Society and the Royal College of Physicians, and the founder of the British Museum in London, began sporadically collecting plants in England and France while studying medicine. In 1687, the Duke of Albemarle offered Sloane a position as personal physician to the West Indies fleet at Jamaica. He accepted and spent fifteen months collecting and cataloguing the native plants, animals, and artificial curiosities (e.g. cultural artifacts of native and enslaved African populations) of Jamaica. This became the basis for his two volume work, Natural History of Jamaica, published in 1707 and 1725. Sloane returned to England in 1689 with over eight hundred specimens of plants, which were live or mounted on heavy paper in an eight-volume herbarium. He also attempted to bring back live animals (e.g., snakes, an alligator, and an iguana) but they all died before reaching England.

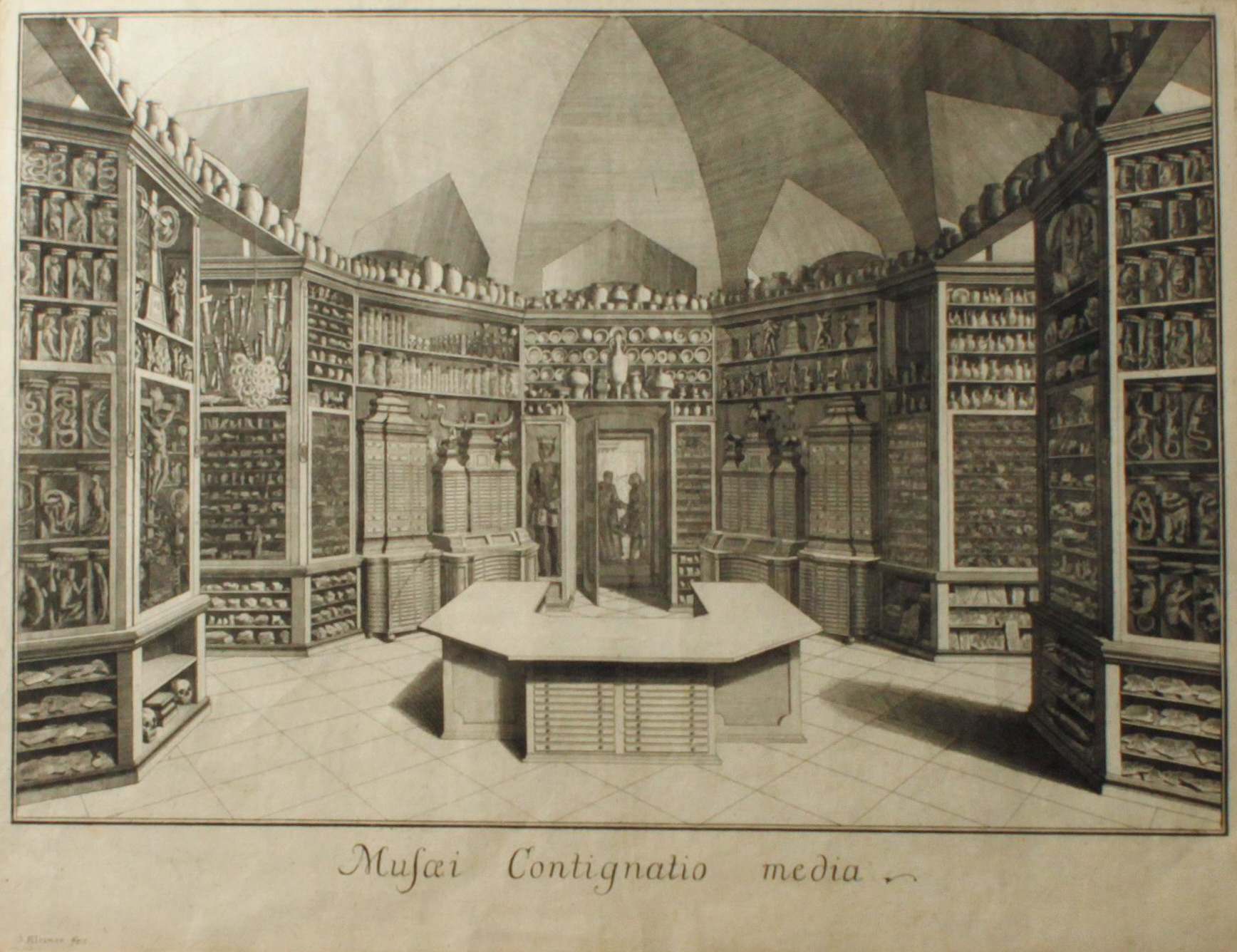
German cabinet, 1745

Sloane meticulously cataloged and created extensive records for most of the specimens and objects in his collection. He also began to acquire other collections by gift or purchase. Herman Boerhaave gave him four volumes of plants from Boerhaave's gardens at Leiden. William Charleton, in a bequest in 1702, gave Sloane numerous books of birds, fish, flowers, and shells and his miscellaneous museum consisting of curiosities, miniatures, insects, medals, animals, minerals, precious stones and curiosities in amber. Sloane purchased Leonard Plukenet's collection in 1710. It consisted of twenty-three volumes with over 8,000 plants from Africa, India, Japan and China. Mary Somerset, Duchess of Beaufort (1630–1715), left him a twelve-volume herbarium from her gardens at Chelsea and Badminton upon her death in 1714. Reverend Adam Buddle gave Sloane thirteen volumes of British plants. In 1716, Sloane purchased Engelbert Kaempfer's volume of Japanese plants and James Petiver's virtual museum of approximately one hundred volumes of plants from Europe, North America, Africa, the Near East, India, and the Orient. Mark Catesby gave him plants from North America and the West Indies from an expedition funded by Sloane. Philip Miller gave him twelve volumes of plants grown from the Chelsea Physic Garden.

Sloane acquired approximately three hundred and fifty artificial curiosities from North American Indians, Inuit, South America, Lapland, Siberia, East Indies, and the West Indies, including nine items from Jamaica. "These ethnological artifacts were important because they established a field of collection for the British Museum that was to increase greatly with the explorations of Captain James Cook in Oceania and Australia and the rapid expansion of the British Empire." Upon his death in 1753, Sloane bequeathed his sizable collection of 337 volumes to England for £20,000. In 1759, George II's royal library was added to Sloane's collection to form the foundation of the British Museum.

John Tradescant the Elder (circa 1570s–1638) was a gardener, naturalist, and botanist in the employ of the Duke of Buckingham. He collected plants, bulbs, flowers, vines, berries, and fruit trees from Russia, the Levant, Algiers, France, Bermuda, the Caribbean, and the East Indies. His son, John Tradescant the Younger (1608–1662) traveled to Virginia in 1637 and collected flowers, plants, shells, an Indian deerskin mantle believed to have belonged to Powhatan, father of Pocahontas. Father and son, in addition to botanical specimens, collected zoological (e.g., the dodo from Mauritius, the upper jaw of a walrus, and armadillos), artificial curiosities (e.g., wampum belts, portraits, lathe turned ivory, weapons, costumes, Oriental footwear and carved alabaster panels) and rarities (e.g., a mermaid's hand, a dragon's egg, two feathers of a phoenix's tail, a piece of the True Cross, and a vial of blood that rained in the Isle of Wight). By the 1630s, the Tradescants displayed their eclectic collection at their residence in South Lambeth. Tradescant's Ark, as it came to be known, was the earliest major cabinet of curiosity in England and open to the public for a small entrance fee.

Elias Ashmole (1617–1692) was a lawyer, chemist, antiquarian, Freemason, and a member of the Royal Society with a keen interest in astrology, alchemy, and botany. Ashmole was also a neighbor of the Tradescants in Lambeth. He financed the publication of Musaeum Tradescantianum, a catalogue of the Ark collection in 1656. Ashmole, a collector in his own right, acquired the Tradescant Ark in 1659 and added it to his collection of astrological, medical, and historical manuscripts. In 1675, he donated his library and collection and the Tradescant collection to the University of Oxford, provided that a suitable building be provided to house the collection. Ashmole's donation formed the foundation of the Ashmolean Museum at Oxford.

Places of exhibitions of and places of new societies that promoted natural knowledge also seemed to culture the idea of perfect civility. Some scholars propose that this was "a reaction against the dogmatism and enthusiasm of the English Civil War and Interregum [sic]." This move to politeness put bars on how one should behave and interact socially, which enabled the distinguishing of the polite from the supposed common or more vulgar members of society. Exhibitions of curiosities (as they were typically odd and foreign marvels) attracted a wide, more general audience, which "[rendered] them more suitable subjects of polite discourse at the Society."

A subject was considered less suitable for polite discourse if the curiosity being displayed was accompanied by too much other material evidence, as it allowed for less conjecture and exploration of ideas regarding the displayed curiosity. Because of this, many displays simply included a concise description of the phenomena and avoided any mention of explanation for the phenomena. Quentin Skinner describes the early Royal Society as "something much more like a gentleman's club," an idea supported by John Evelyn, who depicts the Royal Society as "an Assembly of many honorable Gentlemen, who meete inoffensively together under his Majesty's Royal Cognizance; and to entertaine themselves ingenously, whilst their other domestique avocations or publique business deprives them of being always in the company of learned men and that they cannot dwell forever in the Universities."

Cabinets of Curiosities can now be found at Snowshill Manor and Wallington Hall, and the Ashmolean Museum has a display of items from its disparate Ashmole and Tradescant founding collections.

=== United States ===
Thomas Dent Mutter (1811–1859) was an early American pioneer of reconstructive plastic surgery. His specialty was repairing congenital anomalies, cleft lip and palates, and club foot. He also collected medical oddities, tumors, anatomical and pathological specimens, wet and dry preparations, wax models, plaster casts, and illustrations of medical deformities. This collection began as a teaching tool for young physicians. Just prior to Mütter's death in 1859, he donated 1,344 items to the American College of Physicians in Philadelphia, along with a $30,000 endowment for the maintenance and expansion of his museum. Mütter's collection was added to ninety-two pathological specimens collected by Doctor Isaac Parrish between 1849 and 1852. The Mütter Museum began to collect antique medical equipment in 1871, including Benjamin Rush's medical chest and Florence Nightingale's sewing kit. In 1874 the museum acquired one hundred human skulls from Austrian anatomist and phrenologist, Joseph Hyrtl (1810–1894); a nineteenth-century corpse, dubbed the "soap lady"; the conjoined liver and death cast of Chang and Eng Bunker, the Siamese twins; and in 1893, Grover Cleveland's jaw tumor. The Mütter Museum is an excellent example of a nineteenth-century grotesque cabinet of medical curiosities.

P. T. Barnum established Barnum's American Museum on five floors in New York, "perpetuating into the 1860s the Wunderkammer tradition of curiosities for gullible, often slow-moving throngs—Barnum's famously sly but effective method of crowd control was to post a sign, 'THIS WAY TO THE EGRESS!' at the exit door".

In 1908, New York businessmen formed the Hobby Club, a dining club limited to 50 men, in order to showcase their "cabinets of wonder" and their selected collections. These included literary specimens and incunabula; antiquities such as ancient armour; precious stones and geological items of interest. Annual formal dinners would be used to open the various collections up to inspection for the other members of the club.

== Declining influence ==
By the early decades of the eighteenth century, curiosities and wondrous specimens had begun to lose their influence among European natural philosophers. As Enlightenment thinkers placed growing emphasis on patterns and systems within nature, anomalies and rarities came to be regarded as potentially misleading objects of study. Curiosities, previously interpreted as divine messages and expressions of nature's variety, were increasingly seen as vulgar exceptions to nature's overall uniformity.

== Notable collections started in this way ==
- Ashmolean Museum Oxford – Ashmole and Tradescant collections
- Boerhaave Museum in Leiden
- British Museum in London – Sir Hans Sloane's and other collections
- Chamber of Art and Curiosities, Ambras Castle in Austria, remains largely intact
- Deyrolle in Paris
- Fondation Calvet, Avignon
- Grünes Gewölbe in Dresden
- Kunstkamera in Saint Petersburg, Russia
- Pitt Rivers Museum (Oxford, England) – former Ashmolean dodo
- Teylers Museum in Haarlem
- World Museum in Liverpool – 13th Earl of Derby's collection

== In contemporary culture ==
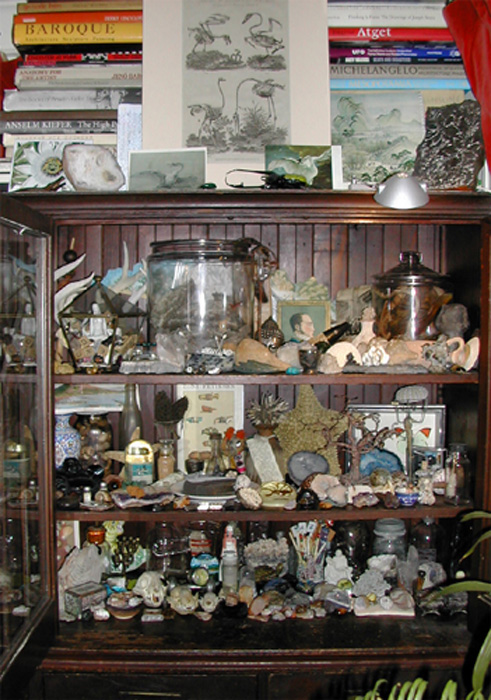
Modern interpretation of a Wunderkammer

The Houston Museum of Natural Science houses a hands-on Cabinet of Curiosities, complete with taxidermied crocodile embedded in the ceiling a la Ferrante Imperato's Dell'Historia Naturale. In Los Angeles, the modern-day Museum of Jurassic Technology anachronistically seeks to recreate the sense of wonder that the old cabinets of curiosity once aroused.

In Spring Green, Wisconsin, the house and museum of Alex Jordan, known as House on the Rock, can also be interpreted as a modern day curiosity cabinet, especially in the collection and display of automatons. In Bristol, Rhode Island, Musée Patamécanique is presented as a hybrid between an automaton theater and a cabinet of curiosities and contains works representing the field of Patamechanics, an artistic practice and area of study chiefly inspired by Pataphysics.

The idea of a cabinet of curiosities has also appeared in recent publications and performances. For example, Cabinet magazine is a quarterly magazine that juxtaposes apparently unrelated cultural artifacts and phenomena to show their interconnectedness in ways that encourage curiosity about the world. The Italian cultural association Wunderkamern uses the theme of historical cabinets of curiosities to explore how "amazement" is manifested within today's artistic discourse. In May 2008, the University of Leeds Fine Art BA programme hosted a show called "Wunder Kammer", the culmination of research and practice from students, which allowed viewers to encounter work from across all disciplines, ranging from intimate installation to thought-provoking video and highly skilled drawing, punctuated by live performances.

The concept has been reinterpreted at The Viktor Wynd Museum of Curiosities, Fine Art & Natural History. In July 2021 a new Cabinet of Curiosities room was opened at The Whitaker Museum & Art Gallery in Rawtenstall, Lancashire, curated by artist Bob Frith, founder of Horse and Bamboo Theatre.

Several internet bloggers describe their sites as "wunderkammern" either because they are primarily links to interesting things, or inspire wonder similarly to the original wunderkammern (see External Links, below). Researcher Robert Gehl describes such internet video sites as YouTube as modern-day wunderkammern, although in danger of being refined into capitalist institutions "just as professionalized curators refined Wunderkammers into the modern museum in the 18th century."

== See also ==
- Antiquarian
- Holophusikon
- Found objects
- Guillermo del Toro's Cabinet of Curiosities
- Imaginarium
- Maximalism
- Medical oddities
- Museum
