= Michael Bernhard Valentini =

German doctor and collector

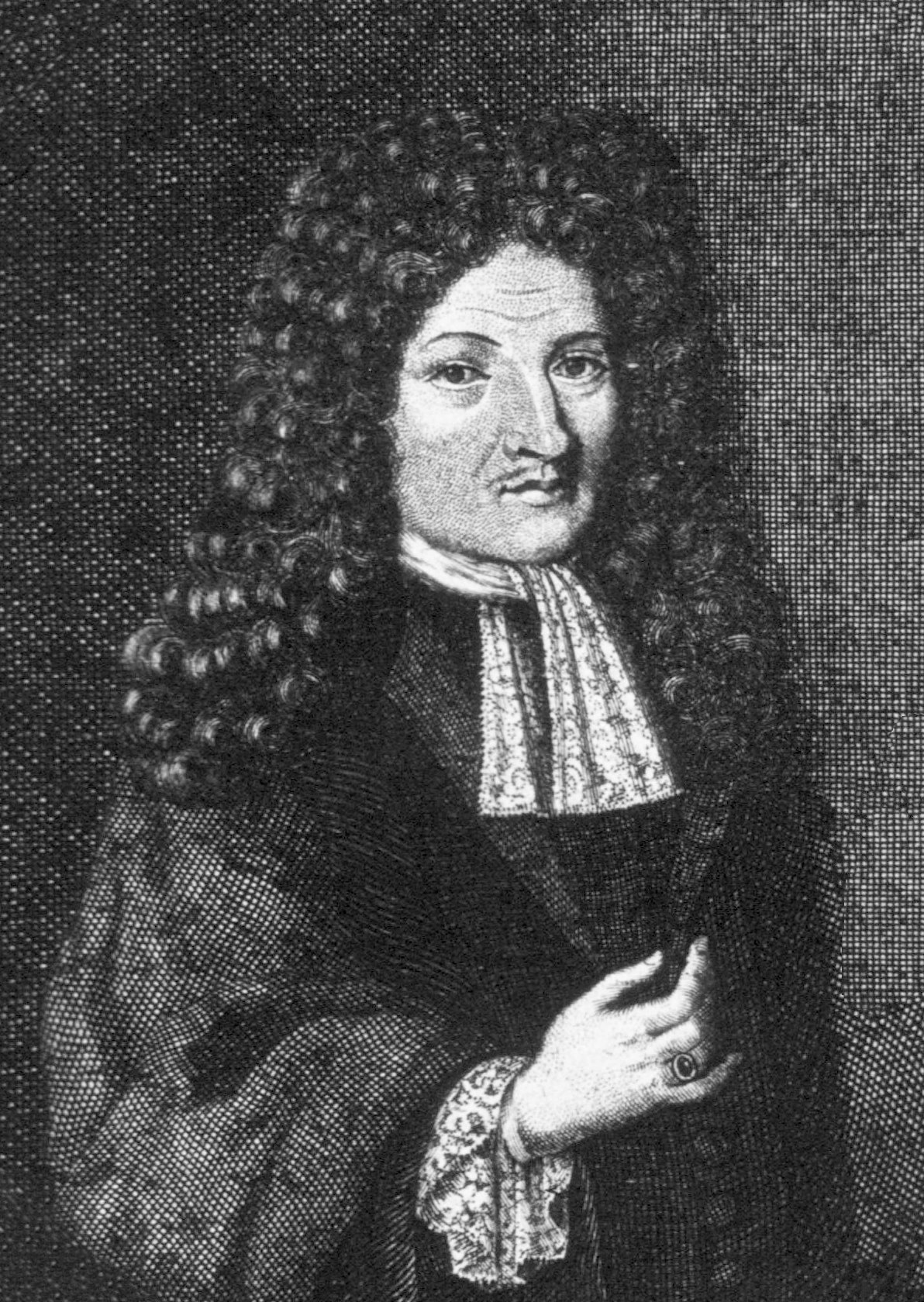
Michael Bernhard Valentini

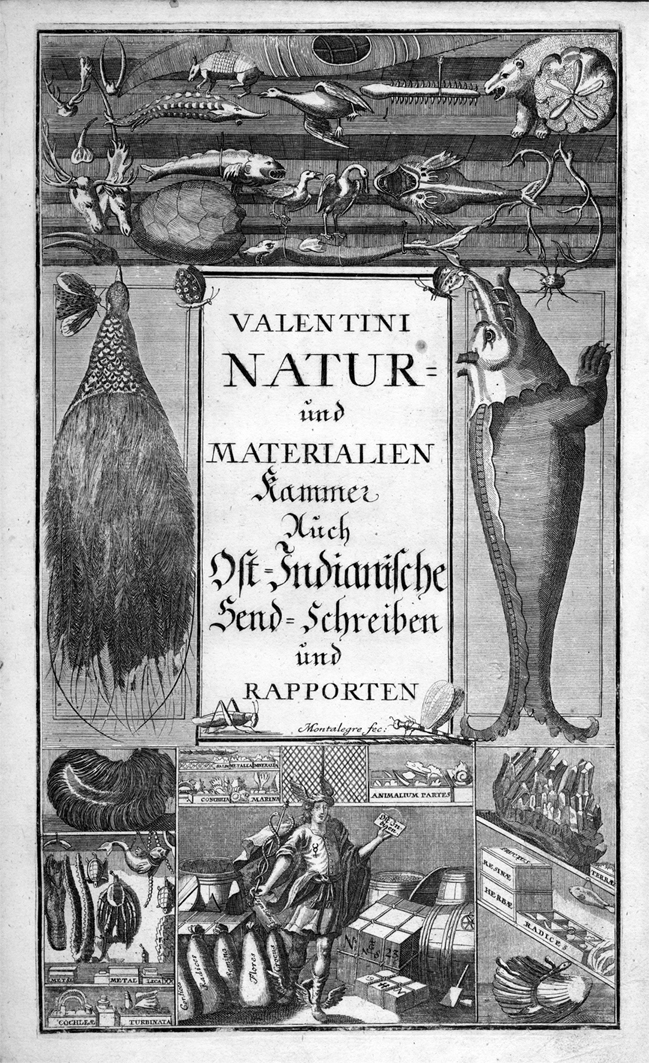
Front page of Museum Museorum (2nd ed., 1714) by Valentini

Michael Bernhard Valentini (26 November 1657 – 18 March 1729) was a medical doctor and a collector from the Holy Roman Empire.

After obtaining his doctorate in 1686 in Giessen he became Professor of Medicine in that city and personal physician to the Margrave of Assia. He had an important Cabinet of curiosities and was the author of Museorum Museum, the first study of collections in Europe. In 1720 he published a work on the comparative anatomy of vertebrates. He was elected a Member of the Royal Society on 10 November 1715 and was also a Member of the Deutsche Akademie der Naturforscher (Leopoldina) and the Prussian Academy of Sciences in Berlin.

== Partial list of publications ==
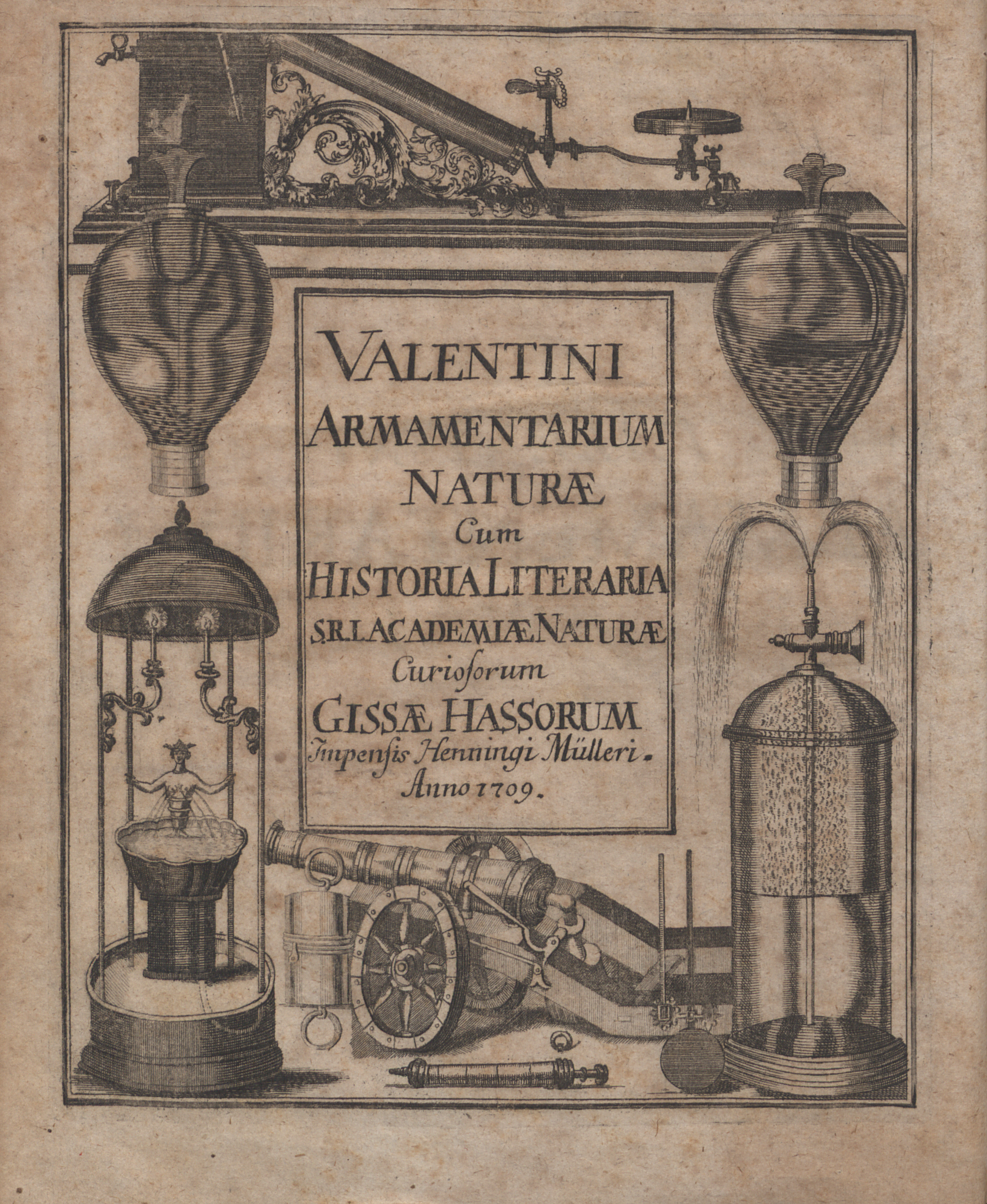
Armamentarium naturae systematicum, 1709

- 1699 : De lapide porcino (in Latin). Giessen: Henning Müller.
- 1702 : De filtro lapide (in Latin). Giessen: Henning Müller.
- 1709 : Armamentarium naturae systematicum (in Latin). Giessen: Henning Müller.
- 1714 : Museum Museorum full title Museum Museorum, oder vollständige Schau-Bühne aller Materialien und Specereyen, nebst deren natürlichen Beschreibung... Aus andern Material-Kunst- und Naturalien-Kammern, Oost- und West-Indischen Reiss-Beschreibungen Frankfurt, heirs of Johann David Zunner and Johann Adam Jungen. Volume 1 deals with descriptions of plants, animals, minerals and metals and their commercial and medical uses. Volume 2 covers rocks and minerals, fossils, tropical plants, shells, unicorns and monstrosities and has a section on coins. A separate appendix, Ost-Indianische Send-Schreiben, is a compilation from Georg Eberhard Rumphius, Engelbert Kaempfer, Willem ten Rhijne, Andreas Cleyer and other naturalists on the rarities, mostly botanical, of the East Indies. Volume 3 is devoted to experiments in physics and natural science.
- 1719 : Viridarium reformatum, seu regnum vegetabilis Das ist eingerichtet und-Neu-buch vollständiges Kräuter, Worinnen alfo noch nicht geschehen Weise, als Kräutern Vegetabilien CRF, Sträuchen, Bäumen, Bluhmen Erd-und anderer Art Gewachsen, Krafft und beschreiben werden Würckung dergestalter, dass man dieses Werck statt einer Botanischen Bibliotheca haben, jedes zu seiner rechten Haupt Kraut-Art bringen, dessen Nutzen auch in der deutlich Artzney umständlich und finden ... (Anton Heinscheidt, Frankfurt am Main).
- 1719 : Viridarium reformatum (in Latin). Frankfurt am Main: Anton Heinscheidt.

-These two volumes contain many illustrated plates from various botanical works for the Florilegium novum and Florilegium and renovatum auctum of Johannes Theodorus de Bry (1561–1623) and others.

- 1720 : Amphitheatrum zootomicum (Frankfurt am Main).
- 1742 : Amphitheatrum zootomicum (in Latin) (2 ed.). Frankfurt am Main: Johann David Zunner.

== Online sources ==
Museum museorum (digitized by Lund University Library)
