= Governor of Hofburg Palace =

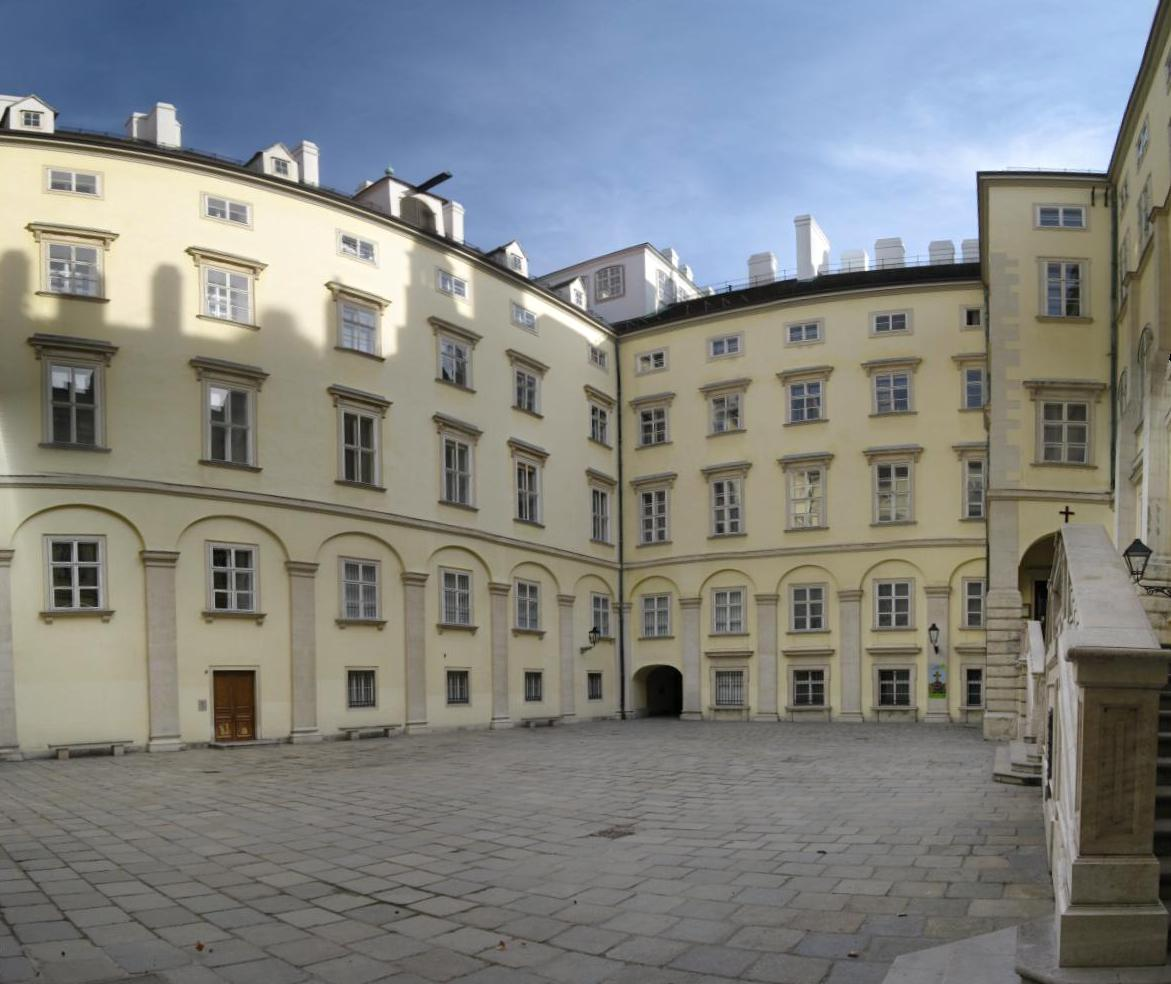
The offices of the governor of the Hofburg are located in the Swiss Wing (Schweizertrakt)

The Governor of Hofburg Palace is in charge of the Hofburg palace in Vienna. The office is under auspices of the Burghauptmannschaft.

The office exists since the Middle Ages and for most of the period and into the Baroque era the title was Burggrave. Starting in 1750 under the reign of Empress Maria Theresa the office became known as Burginspektor. It was changed again in 1850 under the reign of Emperor Franz Joseph I to Burghauptmann, a title which also appeared however in the Middle Ages.

Originally the office was entrusted to guard the castle and defend it in case of attack. The holder of the office and the administration was located in the castle as well. Apart from the administration and logistics of the palace, it also included the movable objects such as furniture.

== List of governors ==
- Burggrave Michael von Maidenau around 1434
- Burghauptmann Niklas Barczal von Döbre 1443-1447
- Burghauptmann Graf Johann von Schaunberg 1447-?
- Burggrave Cristoff von Hohenveld 1492-1496
- Vicedominus-Burggrave Siegmund Schnaidpeck 1497-1501
- Vicedominus-Burggrave Hans Mader 1501-1503
- Vicedominus-Burggrave Lorenz Saurer 1503-1525
- Einnehmergeneral and Vicedominus Georg Khiembseer 1525-1526
- Stadthauptmann of Vienna Hans von Greysenegg 1526-1530
- Stadthauptmann Hanns Apfaltrer 1530-1538
- Burgvogt Joachim von Thalheim 1538-1547 together with Administrator of Burggrave Christo Aichstetter 1541-1552
- Burggrave Leopold Heyperger 1547-1560
- Burggrave Veit Schärdinger 1560-1572
- Burggrave Richard Perger 1572-1572
- Burggrave Hanns Radlhofer 1573-1582
- Burggrave Jacob von Haag 1582-1592
- Provisional Burggrave Hans Wilhelm Rechperger 1592-1594
- Burggrave Hans Painsodt 1594-1598
- Burg-Countess Marie Painsodt 1598-1601
- Burggrave Lucas Eisenhardt 1601-1616 together with Administrator of Burggrave Hanns Kreussig 1614-1617
- Burggrave Erasmus de Sayue 1617-1632
- Burggrave Oswald von Hüttendorf 1632-1642
- Burggrave Andreas de Harena 1643-1661
- Burggrave Johann Ostermeyer 1661-1678
- Burggrave Peter Parent de Clerfort 1679-1693
- Administrator of Burggrave Conrad Engel 1691-1694
- Burggrave Siegmund Fürnpfeil von Pfeilheim 1694-1699
- Burggrave Conrad Engel von Engelburg 1699-1709
- Burggrave Nicolas Collard 1709-1725
- Burggrave Johann Anton von Schiessl 1725-1756
- Burginspektor Andreas Pögle 1750-1767
- Burggrave Anton von Salazar 1756-1792
- Burginspektor Andreas Pögle 1750-1767
- Burginspektor Ignaz Brändl 1767-1795
- Burginspektor Josef Fauken 1795-1808
- Burginspektor Peter Roth 1808-1820
- Burginspektor Johann Seri 1820-1835
- Burginspektor Ludwig Wagner 1835-1850
- Burghauptmann Ludwig Montoyer 1850-1870
- Burghauptmann Ferdinand Kirschner 1870-1895
- Burghauptmann Heinrich Lisseck 1895-1902
- Burghauptmann Anton Niklas 1902-1909
- Burghauptmann Anton Hauffe 1909-1915
- Burghauptmann Rudolf Mammer 1916-1922
- Burgbauarchitekt Ludwig Baumann 1922-1924
- Burghauptmann Emanuel Karajan 1924-1933
- Burghauptmann Rudolf Koppensteiner 1934
- Alois Buresch 1935
- Karl Walbinger 1936-1944
- Rudolf Koppensteiner 1941-1945
- Burghauptmann Paul Neumann 1945-1969
- Burghauptmann Otto Sehorz 1969-1973
- Burghauptmann Karl Bayer 1973-1986
- Burghauptmann Richard Kastner 1987-1993
- Burghauptmann Hans Müller 1994-1995
- Burghauptmann Wolfgang Beer 1995-2010
- Burghauptmann Reinhold Sahl 2010-

== See also ==
- Constables and Governors of Windsor Castle
