= Ferrante Imperato =

Italian humanist

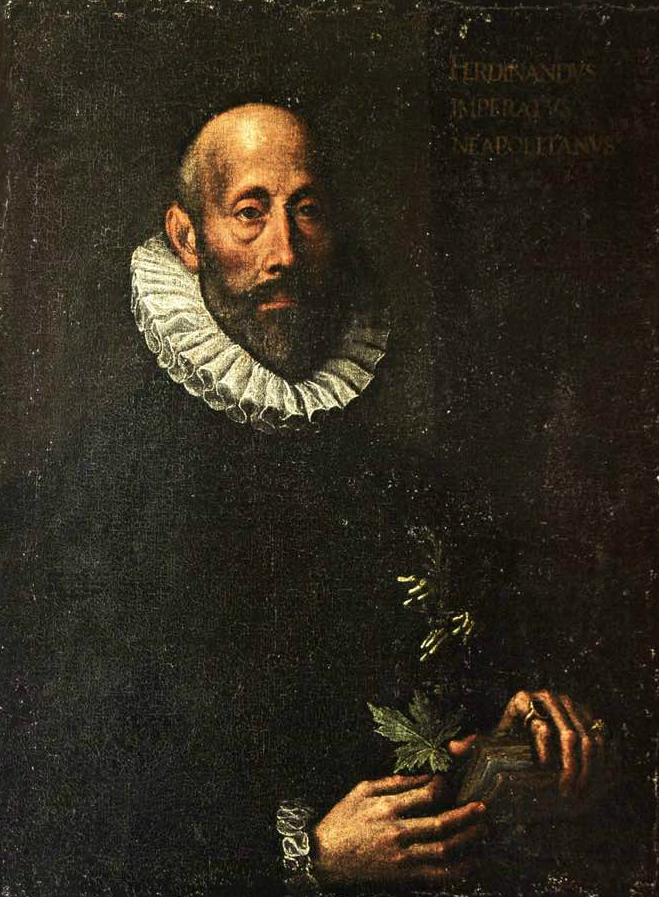
Portrait of Ferrante Imperato

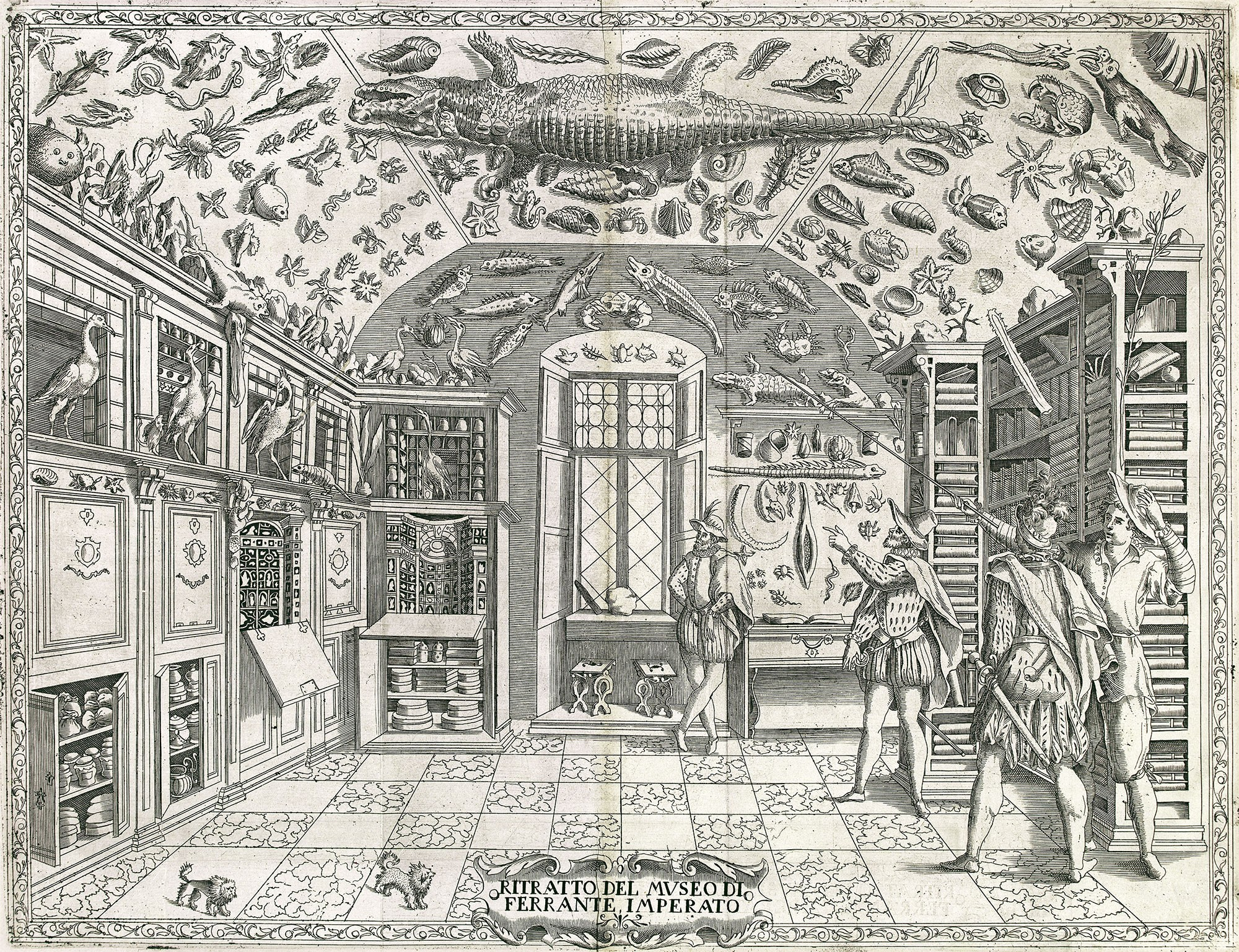
A fold-out frontispiece illustration of Imperato's collection (from Dell'Historia Naturale). Note a crocodile suspended above the window.

Ferrante Imperato (1525? – 1615?) was an apothecary of Naples who published Dell'Historia Naturale in 28 volumes (1599). His celebrated cabinet of curiosities was displayed at Palazzo Gravina in Naples. The grass genus Imperata is named after him.

== Life ==
Ferrante Imperato, who ranged southern Italy making geological observations, took as his motto In dies auctior. He was in correspondence with a network of scholars in Italy. He was among the first correctly to identify the processes through which fossils were formed, subjecting them to empirical tests. His pupil, schooled in the collection, was the jurist Fabio Colonna (1567–1640) who carried further his work on fossils. Ferrante had a small garden and corresponded with botanists, but historians of botany discount his interest in plants as "curiosa".

== Work ==
The full title of Imperato's magnum opus is the following: Dell'historia naturale di Ferrante Imperato napolitano Libri XXVIII. Nella quale ordinatamente si tratta della diversa condition di miniere, e pietre. Con alcune historie di piante et animali; sin hora non date in luce. The book was so sought after that a second edition was issued in Venice, 1672, edited by Giovanni Maria Ferro, who added new material and new illustrations to the concluding chapter.

Dell'historia naturale... featured a fold-out frontispiece illustration of his cabinet of curiosities. It was the first pictorial representation of a Renaissance humanist's displayed natural history research collection.

The catalogue is presented in twenty-eight books, which include nine books devoted to alchemy, a wholly reputable science at the time, which towards the end of the following century would give birth to chemistry. Other books are devoted to mining, animals and plant specimens.

Title page of the 1672 edition of Historia naturale

== Collections ==
The Imperato collection, which the published catalogue made as famous in the 17th century as that of that other famous apothecary and virtuoso, Francesco Calceolari of Verona, ranged widely; it embraced a herbarium, shells, birds, sea creatures, in addition to the fossils, clays, minerals and metallic ores, marble and gem species. It was maintained by Ferrante's son Francesco, who assisted him in writing up his observations, and who may be seen in the engraving pointing out details of the specimens to two visitors as Ferrante looks on.

== Commentary on Imperato ==
Charles Lyell wrote the following in Principles of Geology, vol. 1 (1830), pp. 26–27.

Cesalpino, a celebrated botanist, conceived that fossil shells had been left on the land by the retiring sea, and had concreted into stone during the consolidation the soil; and in the following year (1597), Simeone Majoli went still farther, and, coinciding for the most part with the views of Cesalpino, suggested that the shells and submarine matter of the Veronese, and other districts, might have been cast up, upon the land, by volcanic explosions, like those which gave rise, in 1588, to Monte Nuovo, near Puzzuoli. This hint was the first imperfect attempt to connect the position fossil shells with the agency of volcanoes, a system more fully developed by Hooke, Lazzaro Moro, Hutton, and other writers.

Two years afterwards, Imperati advocated the animal origin of fossilized shells, yet admitted that stones could vegetate by force of "an internal principle;" and, as evidence of this, he referred to the teeth of fish, and spines of echini found petrified.
