= Lower Austria Centre (National Council electoral district) =

Parliamentary electoral district in Austria

- Niederösterreich Mitte
- Electoral District for the National Council
- Location of Lower Austria Centre within Austria
- District: List: Lilienfeld; St. Pölten City; St. Pölten; Tulln
- State: Lower Austria
- Population: 328,022 (2024)
- Electorate: 240,310 (2019)
- Area: 3,062 km^{2} (2023)

Current Electoral District
- Created: 1994
- Seats: List: 7 (2017–present); 5 (1994–2017)
- Members: List: Christian Hafenecker (FPÖ); Johann Höfinger (ÖVP); Robert Laimer (SPÖ); Friedrich Ofenauer (ÖVP)

Lower Austria Centre (German: Niederösterreich Mitte), also known as Electoral District 3D (German: Wahlkreis 3D), is one of the 39 multi-member regional electoral districts of the National Council, the lower house of the Austrian Parliament, the national legislature of Austria. The electoral district was created in 1992 when electoral regulations were amended to add regional electoral districts to the existing state-wide electoral districts and came into being at the following legislative election in 1994. It consists of the city of St. Pölten and the districts of Lilienfeld, St. Pölten and Tulln in the state of Lower Austria. The electoral district currently elects seven of the 183 members of the National Council using the open party-list proportional representation electoral system. At the 2019 legislative election the constituency had 240,310 registered electors.

== History ==
Lower Austria Centre was one 43 regional electoral districts (regionalwahlkreise) established by the "National Council Electoral Regulations 1992" (Nationalrats-Wahlordnung 1992) passed by the National Council in 1992. It consisted of the city of St. Pölten and the districts of Lilienfeld, St. Pölten and Tulln in the state of Lower Austria. The district was initially allocated five seats in May 1993. The Greater Vienna District, which was part of the Greater Vienna regional electoral district, was dissolved in January 2017 and six of its municipalities to the west of Vienna - Gablitz, Mauerbach, Pressbaum, Purkersdorf, Tullnerbach and Wolfsgraben - were transferred to St. Pölten District. As a result, the number of seats allocated to Lower Austria Centre was increased to seven in February 2017.

== Electoral system ==
Lower Austria Centre currently elects seven of the 183 members of the National Council using the open party-list proportional representation electoral system. The allocation of seats is carried out in three stages. In the first stage, seats are allocated to parties (lists) at the regional level using a state-wide Hare quota (wahlzahl) (valid votes in the state divided by the number of seats in the state). In the second stage, seats are allocated to parties at the state/provincial level using the state-wide Hare quota (any seats won by the party at the regional stage are subtracted from the party's state seats). In the third and final stage, seats are allocated to parties at the federal/national level using the D'Hondt method (any seats won by the party at the regional and state stages are subtracted from the party's federal seats). Only parties that reach the 4% national threshold, or have won a seat at the regional stage, compete for seats at the state and federal stages.

Electors may cast one preferential vote for individual candidates at the regional, state and federal levels. Split-ticket voting (panachage), or voting for more than one candidate at each level, is not permitted and will result in the ballot paper being invalidated. At the regional level, candidates must receive preferential votes amounting to at least 14% of the valid votes cast for their party to over-ride the order of the party list (10% and 7% respectively for the state and federal levels). Prior to April 2013 electors could not cast preferential votes at the federal level and the thresholds candidates needed to over-ride the party list order were higher at the regional level (half the Hare quota or 1/6 of the party votes) and state level (Hare quota).

== Election results ==
=== Summary ===
Election	Communists KPÖ+ / KPÖ			Social Democrats SPÖ			Greens GRÜNE			NEOS NEOS / LiF			People's ÖVP			Freedom FPÖ		
Election	Votes	%	Seats	Votes	%	Seats	Votes	%	Seats	Votes	%	Seats	Votes	%	Seats	Votes	%	Seats
2019	1,094	0.57%	0	38,740	20.16%	1	25,691	13.37%	0	16,476	8.57%	0	76,469	39.80%	2	28,950	15.07%	1
2017	1,208	0.60%	0	51,872	25.86%	1	6,842	3.41%	0	10,982	5.48%	0	67,690	33.75%	2	48,569	24.22%	1
2013	1,331	0.86%	0	45,110	29.30%	1	15,757	10.23%	0	6,550	4.25%	0	44,673	29.02%	1	28,142	18.28%	1
2008	1,104	0.70%	0	49,329	31.43%	1	12,807	8.16%	0	2,713	1.73%	0	48,646	31.00%	1	28,353	18.07%	0
2006	1,246	0.82%	0	57,084	37.53%	2	13,864	9.12%	0				56,787	37.34%	2	15,048	9.89%	0
2002	822	0.54%	0	59,005	38.49%	2	11,191	7.30%	0	1,344	0.88%	0	70,409	45.93%	2	10,542	6.88%	0
1999	736	0.51%	0	51,397	35.48%	1	8,707	6.01%	0	3,932	2.71%	0	45,206	31.21%	1	32,291	22.29%	1
1995	546	0.37%	0	57,590	39.46%	2	5,755	3.94%	0	7,190	4.93%	0	47,589	32.61%	1	25,224	17.28%	0
1994	518	0.37%	0	51,244	36.41%	1	8,585	6.10%	0	7,638	5.43%	0	44,385	31.53%	1	26,226	18.63%	0

=== Detailed ===
==== 2010s ====
===== 2019 =====
Results of the 2019 legislative election held on 29 September 2019:

Party		Votes per district					Total votes	%	Seats
Party		Lilien- feld	St. Pölten City	St. Pölten	Tulln	Voting card	Total votes	%	Seats
Austrian People's Party	ÖVP	6,874	9,216	33,660	26,465	254	76,469	39.80%	2
Social Democratic Party of Austria	SPÖ	4,157	8,755	15,301	10,405	122	38,740	20.16%	1
Freedom Party of Austria	FPÖ	2,529	4,451	12,642	9,227	101	28,950	15.07%	1
The Greens	GRÜNE	1,382	4,009	11,059	8,991	250	25,691	13.37%	0
NEOS – The New Austria and Liberal Forum	NEOS	853	2,176	6,877	6,404	166	16,476	8.57%	0
JETZT	JETZT	243	636	1,567	1,267	34	3,747	1.95%	0
KPÖ Plus	KPÖ+	94	226	436	332	6	1,094	0.57%	0
Der Wandel	WANDL	73	181	402	325	9	990	0.52%	0
Valid Votes		16,205	29,650	81,944	63,416	942	192,157	100.00%	4
Rejected Votes		274	426	1,257	795	7	2,759	1.42%	
Total Polled		16,479	30,076	83,201	64,211	949	194,916	81.11%	
Registered Electors		20,144	39,559	101,697	78,910		240,310		
Turnout		81.81%	76.03%	81.81%	81.37%		81.11%		

The following candidates were elected:

- Party mandates - Christian Hafenecker (FPÖ), 1,681 votes; Johann Höfinger (ÖVP), 5,843 votes; Robert Laimer (SPÖ), 2,383 votes; and Friedrich Ofenauer (ÖVP), 1,911 votes. (Note: ÖVP: 2nd placed candidate Michaela Steinacker was elected in Lower Austria.)

===== 2017 =====
Results of the 2017 legislative election held on 15 October 2017:

Party		Votes per district					Total votes	%	Seats
Party		Lilien- feld	St. Pölten City	St. Pölten	Tulln	Voting card	Total votes	%	Seats
Austrian People's Party	ÖVP	5,926	8,188	29,408	23,845	323	67,690	33.75%	2
Social Democratic Party of Austria	SPÖ	4,892	11,037	21,196	14,446	301	51,872	25.86%	1
Freedom Party of Austria	FPÖ	4,414	7,409	21,154	15,421	171	48,569	24.22%	1
NEOS – The New Austria and Liberal Forum	NEOS	587	1,393	4,716	4,161	125	10,982	5.48%	0
Peter Pilz List	PILZ	580	1,434	4,220	3,651	108	9,993	4.98%	0
The Greens	GRÜNE	370	1,005	2,857	2,522	88	6,842	3.41%	0
My Vote Counts!	GILT	240	404	1,310	771	19	2,744	1.37%	0
Communist Party of Austria	KPÖ	87	248	501	359	13	1,208	0.60%	0
The Whites	WEIßE	38	75	179	119	2	413	0.21%	0
Free List Austria	FLÖ	17	39	104	78	3	241	0.12%	0
Valid Votes		17,151	31,232	85,645	65,373	1,153	200,554	100.00%	4
Rejected Votes		256	338	976	694	8	2,272	1.12%	
Total Polled		17,407	31,570	86,621	66,067	1,161	202,826	84.89%	
Registered Electors		20,336	39,303	101,340	77,957		238,936		
Turnout		85.60%	80.32%	85.48%	84.75%		84.89%		

The following candidates were elected:

- Party mandates - Christian Hafenecker (FPÖ), 2,643 votes; Johann Höfinger (ÖVP), 7,867 votes; Robert Laimer (SPÖ), 2,123 votes; and Friedrich Ofenauer (ÖVP), 2,805 votes.

===== 2013 =====
Results of the 2013 legislative election held on 29 September 2013:

Party		Votes per district					Total votes	%	Seats
Party		Lilien- feld	St. Pölten City	St. Pölten	Tulln	Voting card	Total votes	%	Seats
Social Democratic Party of Austria	SPÖ	5,721	11,090	16,971	11,226	102	45,110	29.30%	1
Austrian People's Party	ÖVP	5,131	5,895	19,477	14,050	120	44,673	29.02%	1
Freedom Party of Austria	FPÖ	2,912	5,292	11,484	8,390	64	28,142	18.28%	1
The Greens	GRÜNE	1,199	3,382	6,277	4,791	108	15,757	10.23%	0
Team Stronach	FRANK	823	1,254	2,956	2,108	26	7,167	4.65%	0
NEOS – The New Austria	NEOS	390	1,295	2,670	2,149	46	6,550	4.25%	0
Alliance for the Future of Austria	BZÖ	429	751	1,603	1,275	25	4,083	2.65%	0
Communist Party of Austria	KPÖ	163	319	515	330	4	1,331	0.86%	0
Pirate Party of Austria	PIRAT	96	249	475	320	11	1,151	0.75%	0
Valid Votes		16,864	29,527	62,428	44,639	506	153,964	100.00%	3
Rejected Votes		457	550	1,485	1,018	8	3,518	2.23%	
Total Polled		17,321	30,077	63,913	45,657	514	157,482	81.22%	
Registered Electors		20,876	39,248	77,553	56,214		193,891		
Turnout		82.97%	76.63%	82.41%	81.22%		81.22%		

The following candidates were elected:

- Personal mandates - Johann Höfinger (ÖVP), 9,870 votes.
- Party mandates - Christian Hafenecker (FPÖ), 2,038 votes; and Anton Heinzl (SPÖ), 2,633 votes.

==== 2000s ====
===== 2008 =====
Results of the 2008 legislative election held on 28 September 2008:

Party		Votes per district					Total votes	%	Seats
Party		Lilien- feld	St. Pölten City	St. Pölten	Tulln	Voting card	Total votes	%	Seats
Social Democratic Party of Austria	SPÖ	6,321	12,128	18,353	12,147	380	49,329	31.43%	1
Austrian People's Party	ÖVP	5,497	6,568	20,496	15,682	403	48,646	31.00%	1
Freedom Party of Austria	FPÖ	2,942	5,683	11,466	8,034	228	28,353	18.07%	0
The Greens	GRÜNE	1,008	2,808	5,027	3,744	220	12,807	8.16%	0
Alliance for the Future of Austria	BZÖ	1,146	1,748	4,281	2,693	102	9,970	6.35%	0
Liberal Forum	LiF	182	609	1,014	864	44	2,713	1.73%	0
Fritz Dinkhauser List – Citizens' Forum Tyrol	FRITZ	190	332	777	491	14	1,804	1.15%	0
Independent Citizens' Initiative Save Austria	RETTÖ	206	251	586	371	13	1,427	0.91%	0
Communist Party of Austria	KPÖ	183	249	387	277	8	1,104	0.70%	0
The Christians	DC	101	113	356	206	9	785	0.50%	0
Valid Votes		17,776	30,489	62,743	44,509	1,421	156,938	100.00%	2
Rejected Votes		483	611	1,624	1,103	32	3,853	2.40%	
Total Polled		18,259	31,100	64,367	45,612	1,453	160,791	84.58%	
Registered Electors		21,196	39,274	75,879	53,749		190,098		
Turnout		86.14%	79.19%	84.83%	84.86%		84.58%		

The following candidates were elected:

- Party mandates - Anton Heinzl (SPÖ), 3,077 votes; and Johann Höfinger (ÖVP), 5,861 votes.

===== 2006 =====
Results of the 2006 legislative election held on 1 October 2006:

Party		Votes per district					Total votes	%	Seats
Party		Lilien- feld	St. Pölten City	St. Pölten	Tulln	Voting card	Total votes	%	Seats
Social Democratic Party of Austria	SPÖ	7,324	14,208	20,428	13,338	1,786	57,084	37.53%	2
Austrian People's Party	ÖVP	6,231	7,526	23,237	17,484	2,309	56,787	37.34%	2
Freedom Party of Austria	FPÖ	1,387	3,089	6,116	4,036	420	15,048	9.89%	0
The Greens	GRÜNE	1,033	2,974	5,190	3,688	979	13,864	9.12%	0
Hans-Peter Martin's List	MATIN	524	813	1,920	1,313	160	4,730	3.11%	0
Alliance for the Future of Austria	BZÖ	367	656	1,297	911	100	3,331	2.19%	0
Communist Party of Austria	KPÖ	170	280	449	302	45	1,246	0.82%	0
Valid Votes		17,036	29,546	58,637	41,072	5,799	152,090	100.00%	4
Rejected Votes		407	499	1,416	964	66	3,352	2.16%	
Total Polled		17,443	30,045	60,053	42,036	5,865	155,442	85.50%	
Registered Electors		20,526	38,165	72,513	50,601		181,805		
Turnout		84.98%	78.72%	82.82%	83.07%		85.50%		

The following candidates were elected:

- Party mandates - Alfred Brader (ÖVP), 4,567 votes; Anton Heinzl (SPÖ), 2,887 votes; Johann Höfinger (ÖVP), 6,973 votes; and Beate Schasching (SPÖ), 963 votes.

Substitutions:

- Alfred Brader (ÖVP) resigned on 31 December 2006 and was replaced by Peter Eisenschenk (ÖVP) on 2 January 2007.
- Beate Schasching (SPÖ) resigned on 9 July 2008 and was replaced by Johann Hell (SPÖ) on 10 July 2008.

===== 2002 =====
Results of the 2002 legislative election held on 24 November 2002:

Party		Votes per district					Total votes	%	Seats
Party		Lilien- feld	St. Pölten City	St. Pölten	Tulln	Voting card	Total votes	%	Seats
Austrian People's Party	ÖVP	7,632	10,035	29,008	21,573	2,161	70,409	45.93%	2
Social Democratic Party of Austria	SPÖ	7,756	15,584	20,992	13,276	1,397	59,005	38.49%	2
The Greens	GRÜNE	872	2,792	4,163	2,876	488	11,191	7.30%	0
Freedom Party of Austria	FPÖ	1,163	1,811	4,290	3,039	239	10,542	6.88%	0
Liberal Forum	LiF	126	343	467	360	48	1,344	0.88%	0
Communist Party of Austria	KPÖ	149	181	270	210	12	822	0.54%	0
Valid Votes		17,698	30,746	59,190	41,334	4,345	153,313	100.00%	4
Rejected Votes		310	433	1,115	712	40	2,610	1.67%	
Total Polled		18,008	31,179	60,305	42,046	4,385	155,923	89.36%	
Registered Electors		20,277	36,937	69,257	48,008		174,479		
Turnout		88.81%	84.41%	87.07%	87.58%		89.36%		

The following candidates were elected:

- Party mandates - Alfred Brader (ÖVP), 2,577 votes; Anton Heinzl (SPÖ), 4,225 votes; Johann Kurzbauer (ÖVP), 4,777 votes; and Beate Schasching (SPÖ), 1,300 votes.

==== 1990s ====
===== 1999 =====
Results of the 1999 legislative election held on 3 October 1999:

Party		Votes per district					Total votes	%	Seats
Party		Lilien- feld	St. Pölten City	St. Pölten	Tulln	Voting card	Total votes	%	Seats
Social Democratic Party of Austria	SPÖ	6,768	13,275	18,068	11,634	1,652	51,397	35.48%	1
Austrian People's Party	ÖVP	5,052	6,211	18,982	13,409	1,552	45,206	31.21%	1
Freedom Party of Austria	FPÖ	3,732	5,849	12,578	9,190	942	32,291	22.29%	1
The Greens	GRÜNE	744	2,065	3,263	2,106	529	8,707	6.01%	0
Liberal Forum	LiF	339	913	1,315	1,075	290	3,932	2.71%	0
The Independents	DU	153	402	636	515	66	1,772	1.22%	0
No to NATO and EU – Neutral Austria Citizens' Initiative	NEIN	98	151	349	185	22	805	0.56%	0
Communist Party of Austria	KPÖ	128	182	211	201	14	736	0.51%	0
Valid Votes		17,014	29,048	55,402	38,315	5,067	144,846	100.00%	3
Rejected Votes		385	590	1,223	806	53	3,057	2.07%	
Total Polled		17,399	29,638	56,625	39,121	5,120	147,903	86.45%	
Registered Electors		20,365	36,884	67,585	46,251		171,085		
Turnout		85.44%	80.35%	83.78%	84.58%		86.45%		

The following candidates were elected:

- Party mandates - Anton Heinzl (SPÖ), 2,001 votes; Johann Kurzbauer (ÖVP), 3,970 votes; and Wilhelm Weinmeier (FPÖ), 1,040 votes.

===== 1995 =====
Results of the 1995 legislative election held on 17 December 1995:

Party		Votes per district					Total votes	%	Seats
Party		Lilien- feld	St. Pölten City	St. Pölten	Tulln	Voting card	Total votes	%	Seats
Social Democratic Party of Austria	SPÖ	7,815	15,486	20,187	13,038	1,064	57,590	39.46%	2
Austrian People's Party	ÖVP	5,277	6,812	20,047	14,400	1,053	47,589	32.61%	1
Freedom Party of Austria	FPÖ	3,036	4,663	10,128	6,842	555	25,224	17.28%	0
Liberal Forum	LiF	583	1,775	2,505	1,998	329	7,190	4.93%	0
The Greens	GRÜNE	516	1,408	2,193	1,346	292	5,755	3.94%	0
No – Civic Action Group; Against the Sale of Austria	NEIN	314	371	848	472	43	2,048	1.40%	0
Communist Party of Austria	KPÖ	114	148	143	130	11	546	0.37%	0
Valid Votes		17,655	30,663	56,051	38,226	3,347	145,942	100.00%	3
Rejected Votes		527	778	1,512	932	32	3,781	2.53%	
Total Polled		18,182	31,441	57,563	39,158	3,379	149,723	89.36%	
Registered Electors		20,499	36,877	65,627	44,548		167,551		
Turnout		88.70%	85.26%	87.71%	87.90%		89.36%		

The following candidates were elected:

- Party mandates - Johann Kurzbauer (ÖVP), 2,526 votes; Heidemaria Onodi (SPÖ), 1,616 votes; and Robert Sigl (SPÖ), 2,625 votes.

Substitutions:

- Heidemaria Onodi (SPÖ) resigned on 31 March 1998 and was replaced by Anton Heinzl (SPÖ) on 7 April 1998.

===== 1994 =====
Results of the 1994 legislative election held on 9 October 1994:

Party		Votes per district					Total votes	%	Seats
Party		Lilien- feld	St. Pölten City	St. Pölten	Tulln	Voting card	Total votes	%	Seats
Social Democratic Party of Austria	SPÖ	7,063	13,893	17,802	11,223	1,263	51,244	36.41%	1
Austrian People's Party	ÖVP	5,080	6,230	18,709	13,086	1,280	44,385	31.53%	1
Freedom Party of Austria	FPÖ	3,103	4,895	10,321	7,216	691	26,226	18.63%	0
The Greens	GRÜNE	841	2,125	3,064	2,128	427	8,585	6.10%	0
Liberal Forum	LiF	657	1,783	2,604	2,275	319	7,638	5.43%	0
No – Civic Action Group; Against the Sale of Austria	NEIN	323	377	792	383	30	1,905	1.35%	0
Communist Party of Austria	KPÖ	116	150	125	110	17	518	0.37%	0
United Greens Austria – List Adi Pinter	VGÖ	20	29	44	38	6	137	0.10%	0
Citizen Greens Austria – Free Democrats	BGÖ	15	29	40	34	2	120	0.09%	0
Valid Votes		17,218	29,511	53,501	36,493	4,035	140,758	100.00%	2
Rejected Votes		503	751	1,545	958	48	3,805	2.63%	
Total Polled		17,721	30,262	55,046	37,451	4,083	144,563	86.49%	
Registered Electors		20,544	37,199	65,366	44,042		167,151		
Turnout		86.26%	81.35%	84.21%	85.03%		86.49%		

The following candidates were elected:

- Party mandates - Johann Kurzbauer (ÖVP), 4,363 votes; and Robert Sigl (SPÖ), 3,616 votes.
