= Ónodi =

Ónodi [ˈoːnodi], Ónody or Onodi is a Hungarian surname. It may refer to:

== Ónodi ==
- Adolf Ónodi (1857–1919), Hungarian otorhinolaryngologist and surgeon
- Eszter Ónodi (born 1973), Hungarian film and theater actress
- Gábor Ónodi (born 1979), Hungarian actor
- Henrietta Ónodi (born 1974), Hungarian artistic gymnast
- Ónodi Sándor born 1985, Hungarian Double Bass player and violin maker.

== Ónody ==
- Andor Ónody (1920–1986), Hungarian footballer
- József Ónody (1882–1957), Hungarian freestyle swimmer

== Onodi ==
- Heidemaria Onodi (born 1957), Austrian politician
