= Königstetten =

- Municipality
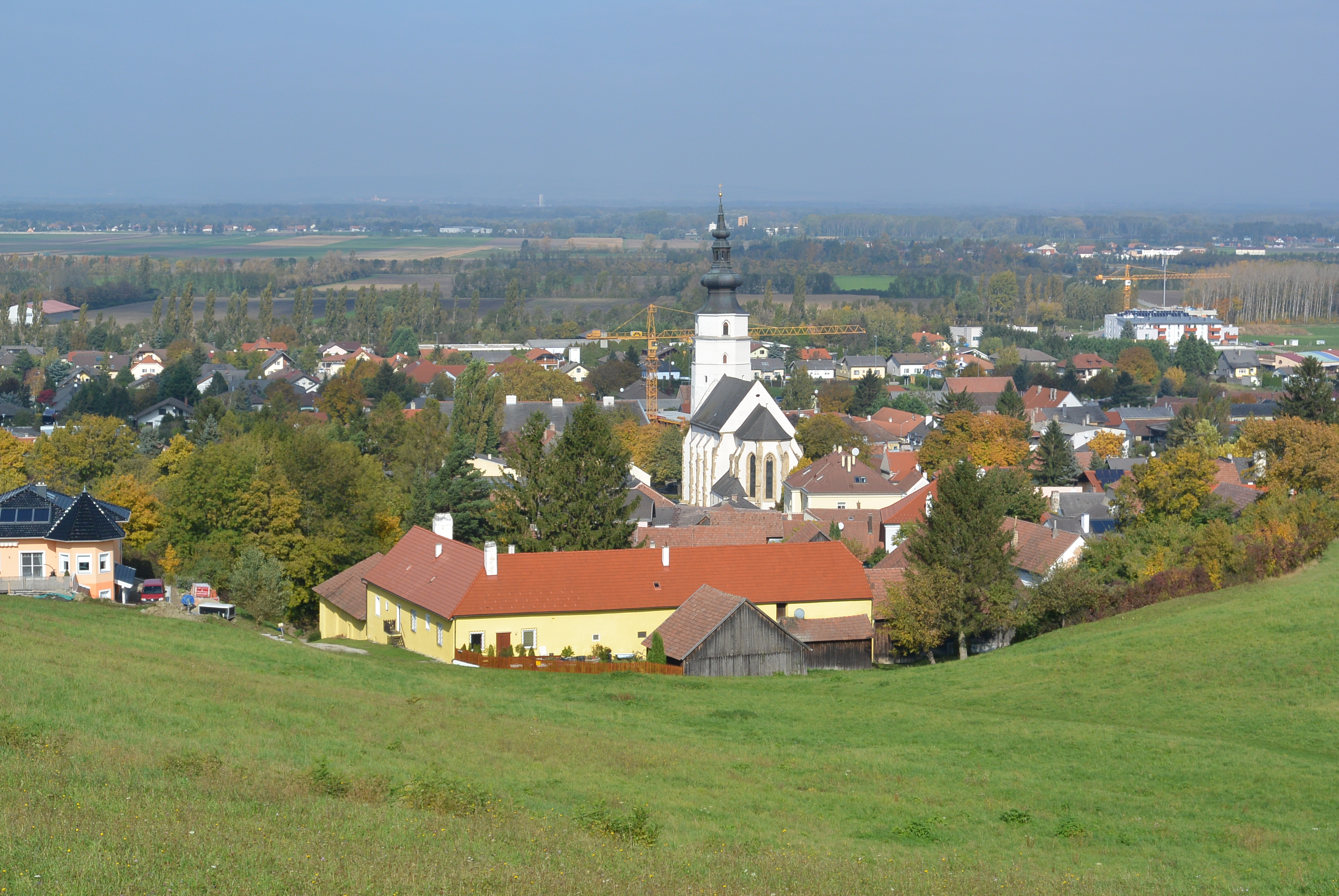
- View of Königstetten

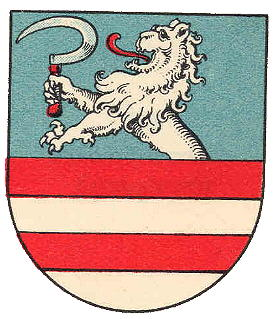
- Coat of arms

- Location within Austria
- Coordinates: 48°17′00″N 16°07′00″E
- Country: Austria
- State: Lower Austria
- District: Tulln

Government
  - Mayor: Roland Nagl (ÖVP)

Area
  - Total: 13.1 km^{2} (5.1 sq mi)
- Elevation: 181 m (594 ft)

Population (2018-01-01)
  - Total: 2,406
  - Density: 184/km^{2} (476/sq mi)
- Time zone: UTC+1 (CET)
  - Summer (DST): UTC+2 (CEST)
- Postal code: 3433
- Area code: 02273
- Vehicle registration: TU
- Website: www.koenigstetten.gv.at

Königstetten is a municipality in the district of Tulln in the Austrian state of Lower Austria.

== Population ==
Historical population
Year	Pop.	±%
1971	1,202	—
1981	1,308	+8.8%
1991	1,635	+25.0%
2001	1,888	+15.5%
