= Sieghartskirchen =

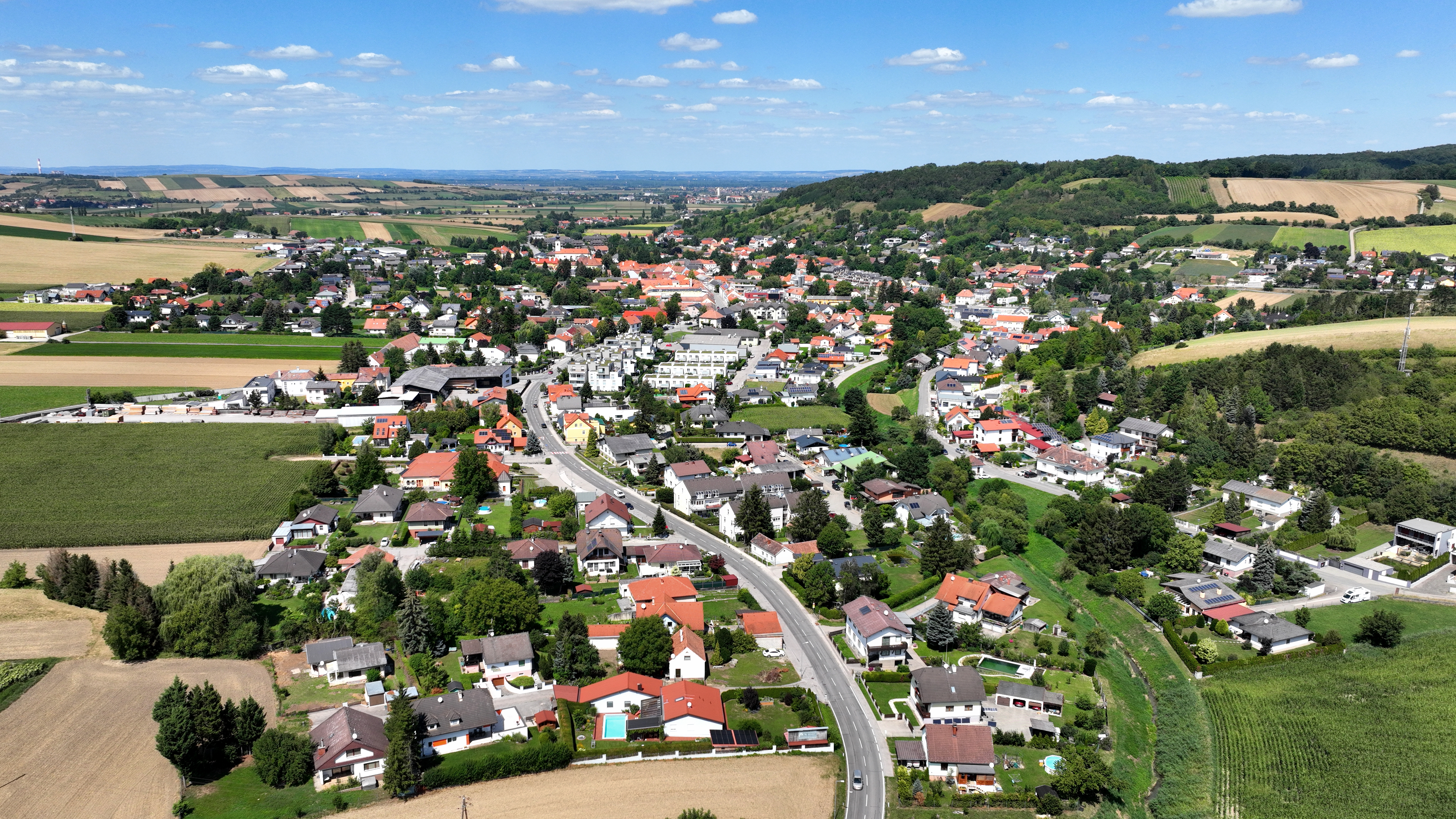
- South view of Sieghartskirchen

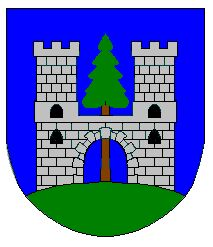
- Coat of arms

- Location within Austria
- Coordinates: 48°15′14″N 16°00′45″E
- Country: Austria
- State: Lower Austria
- District: Tulln

Government
  - Mayor: Josefa Geiger (ÖVP)

Area
  - Total: 61.68 km^{2} (23.81 sq mi)
- Elevation: 205 m (673 ft)

Population (2018-01-01)
  - Total: 7,528
  - Density: 122.0/km^{2} (316.1/sq mi)
- Time zone: UTC+1 (CET)
  - Summer (DST): UTC+2 (CEST)
- Postal code: 3443
- Area code: 02274
- Vehicle registration: TU
- Website: www.sieghartskirchen.gv.at

Sieghartskirchen is a municipality in the district of Tulln in the Austrian state of Lower Austria.

== Population ==
Historical population
Year	Pop.	±%
1869	4,353	—
1961	4,007	−7.9%
1991	5,812	+45.0%
2001	6,674	+14.8%
2010	7,011	+5.0%
