= Zeiselmauer-Wolfpassing =

- Municipality
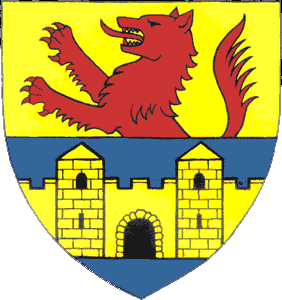
- Coat of arms

- Location within Austria
- Coordinates: 48°19′10″N 16°10′30″E
- Country: Austria
- State: Lower Austria
- District: Tulln

Government
  - Mayor: Eduard Roch (ÖVP)

Area
  - Total: 12.69 km^{2} (4.90 sq mi)
- Elevation: 175 m (574 ft)

Population (2018-01-01)
  - Total: 2,302
  - Density: 181.4/km^{2} (469.8/sq mi)
- Time zone: UTC+1 (CET)
  - Summer (DST): UTC+2 (CEST)
- Postal code: 3424
- Area code: 02242
- Vehicle registration: TU
- Website: Community of Zeiselmauer-Wolfpassing

Zeiselmauer-Wolfpassing is a community located in the district of Tulln in the Austrian federal state of Lower Austria.

== Geography ==
Zeiselmauer-Wolfpassing is located in the Tulln Basin which is a basin surrounding the city of Tulln. The municipality consists of the two "cadastral" communities Zeiselmauer and Wolfpassing which make up an area of about 12.7 square kilometres in total. The river Danube separates the territory into two parts; slightly more than 50 percent of the entire area is forested.

=== Population Development ===
This is an overview of the population development in the last century:

Historical population
Year	Pop.	±%
1900	646	—
1951	1,503	+132.7%
1971	1,397	−7.1%
1981	1,470	+5.2%
1991	1,733	+17.9%
2001	1,966	+13.4%
2013	2,236	+13.7%

== History ==
Zeiselmauer, Castra (Cannabiaca) was a part from limes Norici of the Roman province Noricum.

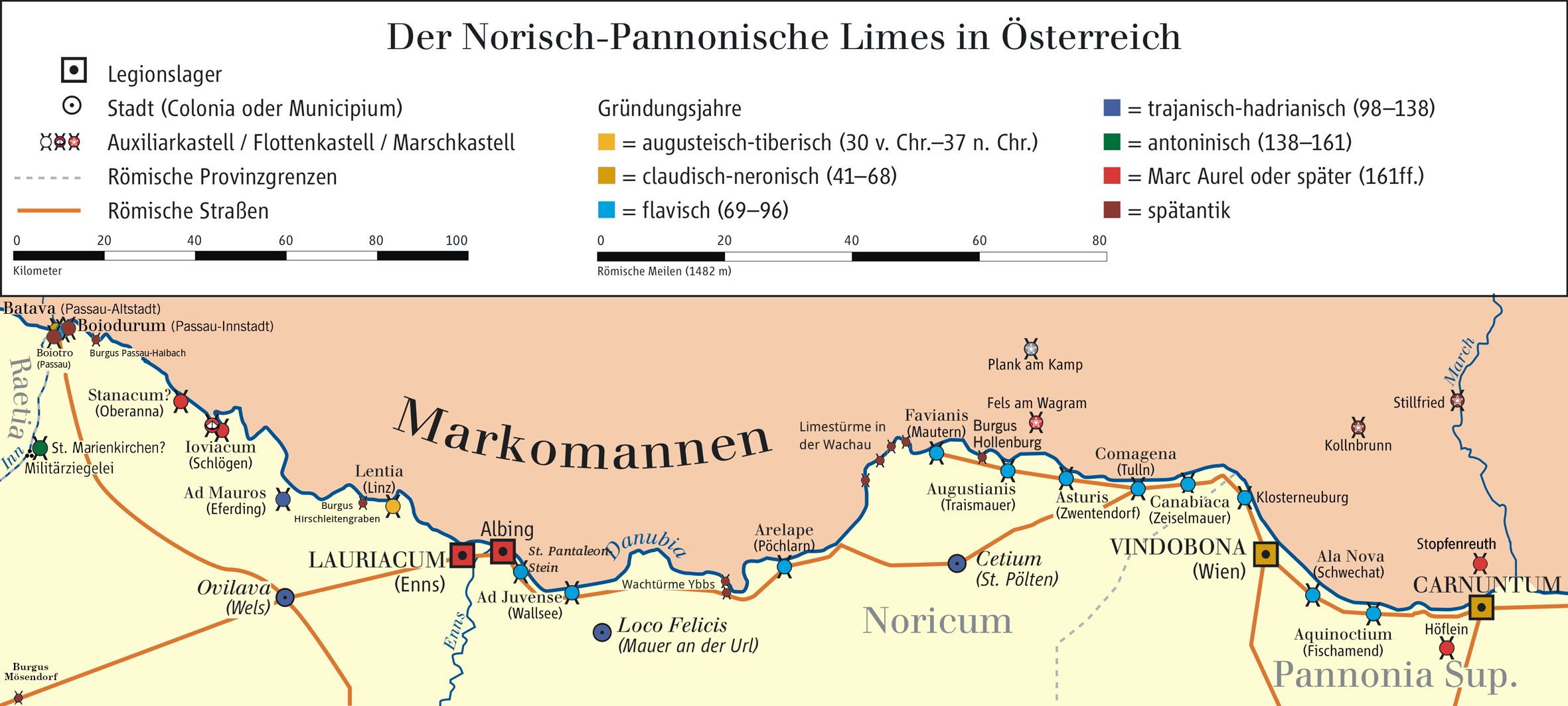
Limes Norici

=== Coat of Arms ===
The official coat of arms of Zeiselmauer-Wolfpassing depicts the history of the village. Roman fort walls show the long provable history and furthermore the cultural imprint of the Romans on this area, whereas the red wolf is a symbol of the 1,000-year-long period of Zeiselmauer belonging to the Roman Catholic Diocese of Passau as it is also visible on their official emblem.

== Politics ==
Following an unscheduled election in April 2013 the current community council is composed of four fractions holding 19 seats in total: The Social Democrats (SPÖ) hold eight seats, the Austrian People's Party (ÖVP) hold six seats, a local party called "Liste Aktiv" holds four seats and the last seat is occupied by the Greens (Grüne).

The mayor currently in service is Eduard Roch (ÖVP) whose fraction is forming a coalition with the party "Liste Aktiv" led by Michael Weber.

== Economy, Traffic, Infrastructure ==
In 1999 20 farms were located in the village, whereas in 2001 72 non-agricultural businesses were listed in Zeiselmauer-Wolfpassing. In the same year, the labour force participation made up slightly more than 48 per cent.

Two traffic arteries transect the village of Zeiselmauer from West to East, these are Bundesstraße 14 and railway line S40 which is part of the Vienna S-Bahn-system connecting Vienna (Franz-Josefs-Bahnhof) with the towns of Tulln and St. Pölten in the West. Landesstraße L118 in Wolfpassing is known for traffic jams during rush hours because of a narrow single-lane section regulated by traffic lights.

== Sights ==
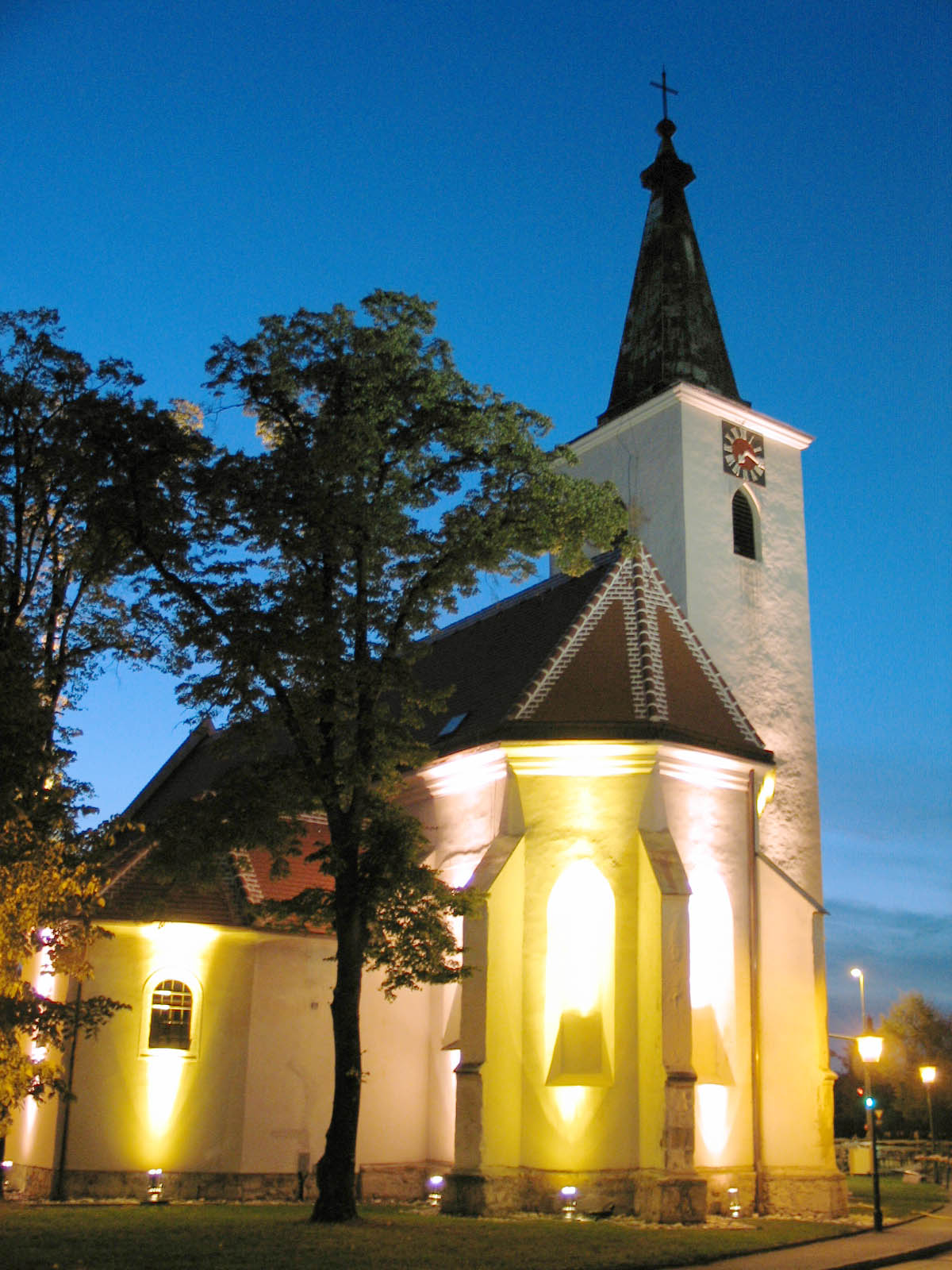
Church in Zeiselmauer

- Roman fort "Cannabiaca", which is about 2,000 years old
- Roman Catholic Church of Zeiselmauer
- some other listed historic buildings
