= Johann Höfinger =

Austrian politician (born 1969)

Member of the National Council
- Incumbent
- Assumed office 30 October 2006
- Constituency: Lower Austria Centre

Member of the Federal Council
- In office 24 April 2003 – 29 October 2006

Personal details
- Born: 18 July 1969 (age 56)
- Party: People's Party

Johann Höfinger (born 18 July 1969) is an Austrian politician of the People's Party serving as a member of the National Council since 2006. From 2003 to 2006, he was a member of the Federal Council.
