= Tulbing =

- Municipality
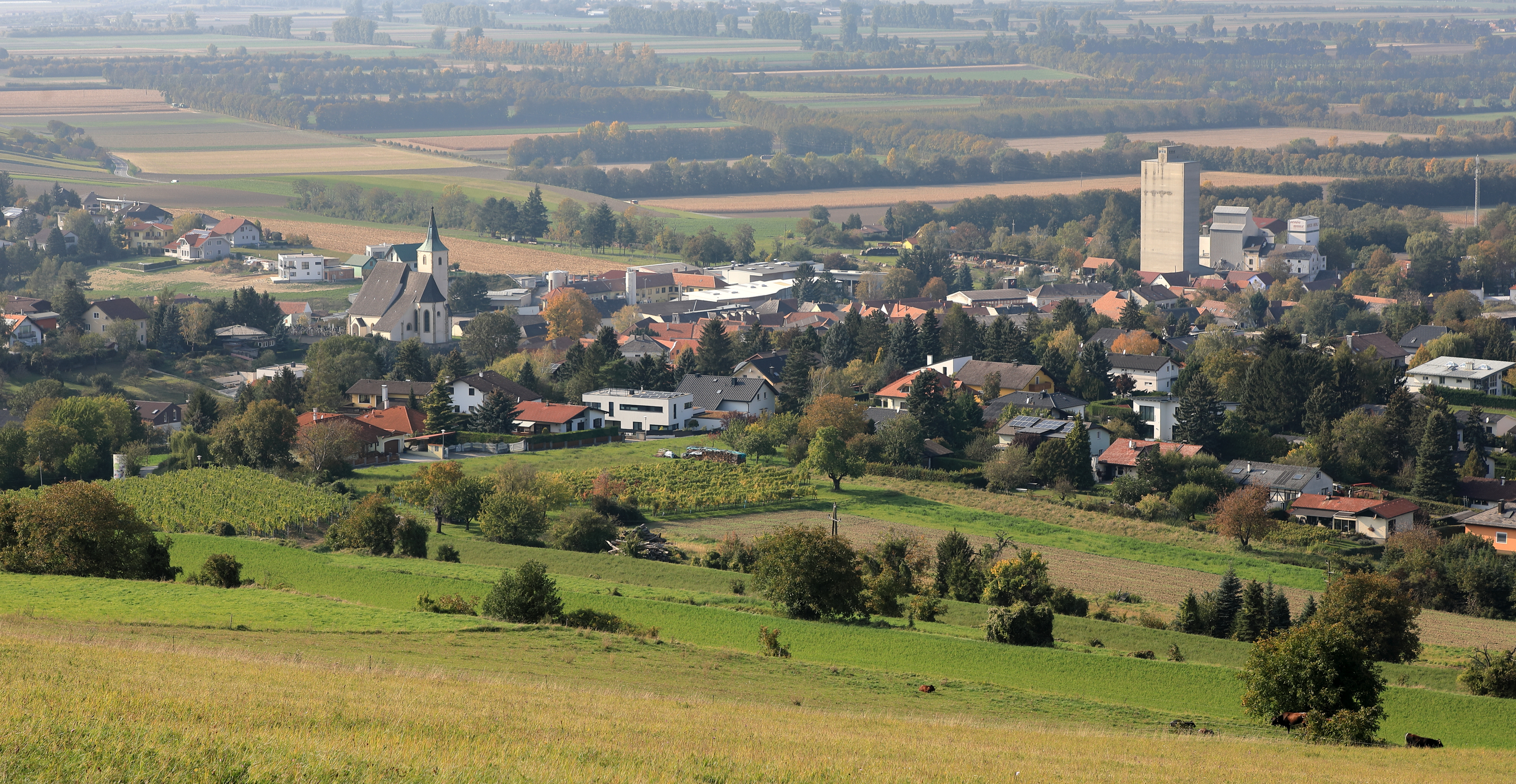

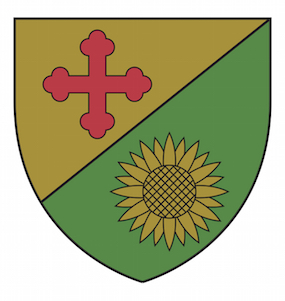
- Coat of arms

- Location within Austria
- Coordinates: 48°17′15″N 16°07′00″E
- Country: Austria
- State: Lower Austria
- District: Tulln

Government
  - Mayor: Anna Haider (ÖVP)

Area
  - Total: 18.4 km^{2} (7.1 sq mi)
- Elevation: 206 m (676 ft)

Population (2018-01-01)
  - Total: 2,971
  - Density: 161/km^{2} (418/sq mi)
- Time zone: UTC+1 (CET)
  - Summer (DST): UTC+2 (CEST)
- Postal code: 3434
- Area code: 02273
- Vehicle registration: TU
- Website: www.tulbing.at

Tulbing is a municipality in the district of Tulln in the Austrian state of Lower Austria. Tulbing is known for its rural landscape.

== Population ==
Historical population
Year	Pop.	±%
1971	1,433	—
1981	1,755	+22.5%
1991	2,250	+28.2%
2001	2,534	+12.6%
