= Würmla =

- Municipality
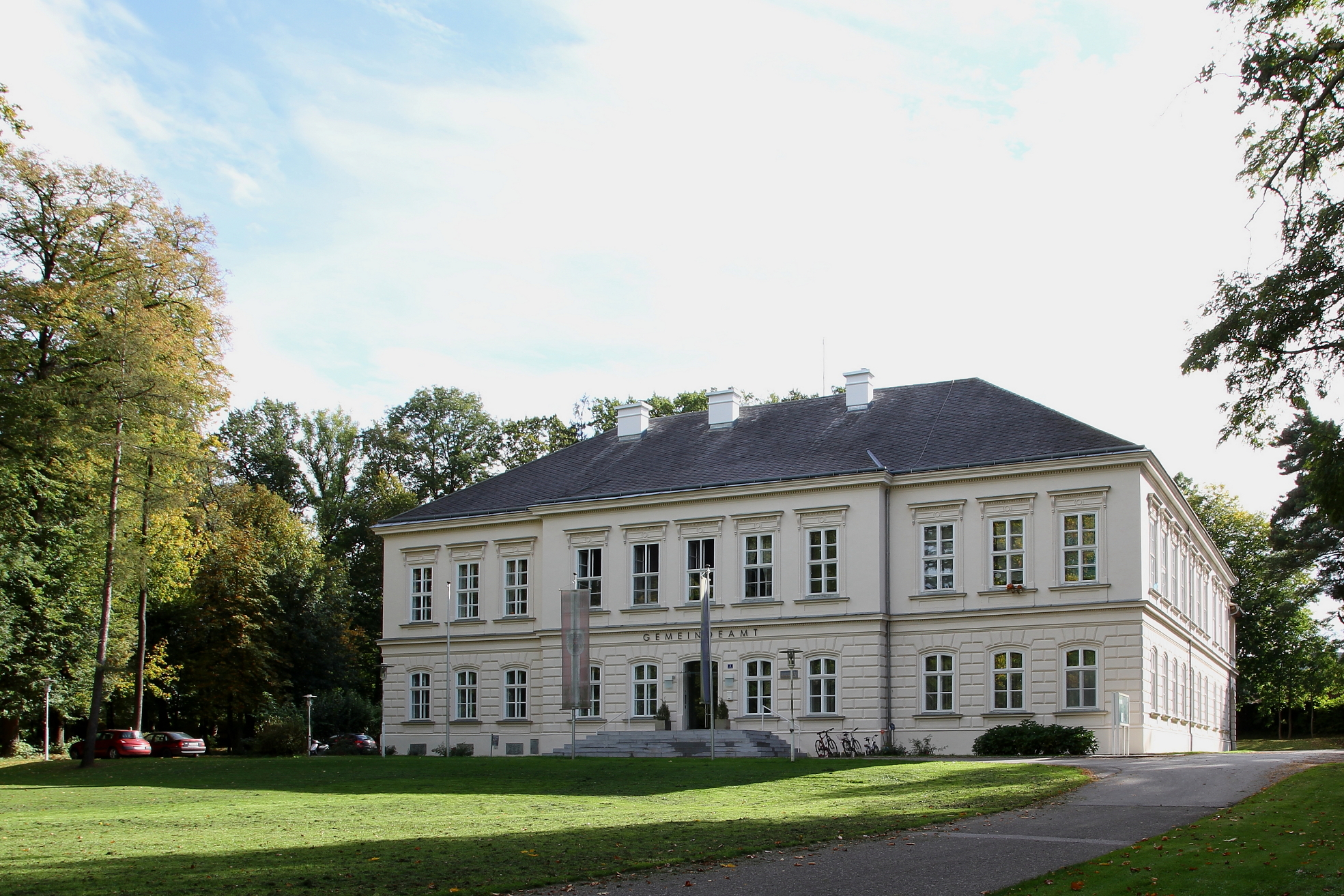
- Würmla Castle

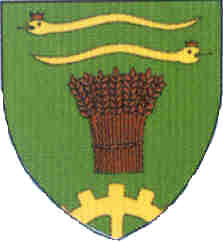
- Coat of arms

- Location within Austria
- Coordinates: 48°15′19″N 15°51′37″E
- Country: Austria
- State: Lower Austria
- District: Tulln

Government
  - Mayor: Johannes Diemt (ÖVP)

Area
  - Total: 20.4 km^{2} (7.9 sq mi)
- Elevation: 228 m (748 ft)

Population (2018-01-01)
  - Total: 1,429
  - Density: 70.0/km^{2} (181/sq mi)
- Time zone: UTC+1 (CET)
  - Summer (DST): UTC+2 (CEST)
- Postal code: 3042
- Area code: 02275
- Vehicle registration: TU
- Website: www.wuermla.at

Würmla is a municipality in the district of Tulln in the Austrian state of Lower Austria.

== Population ==
Historical population
| Year | Pop. | ±% |
|---|---|---|
| 1971 | 1,016 | — |
| 1981 | 1,056 | +3.9% |
| 1991 | 1,164 | +10.2% |
| 2001 | 1,258 | +8.1% |
