= Grafenwörth =

- Municipality
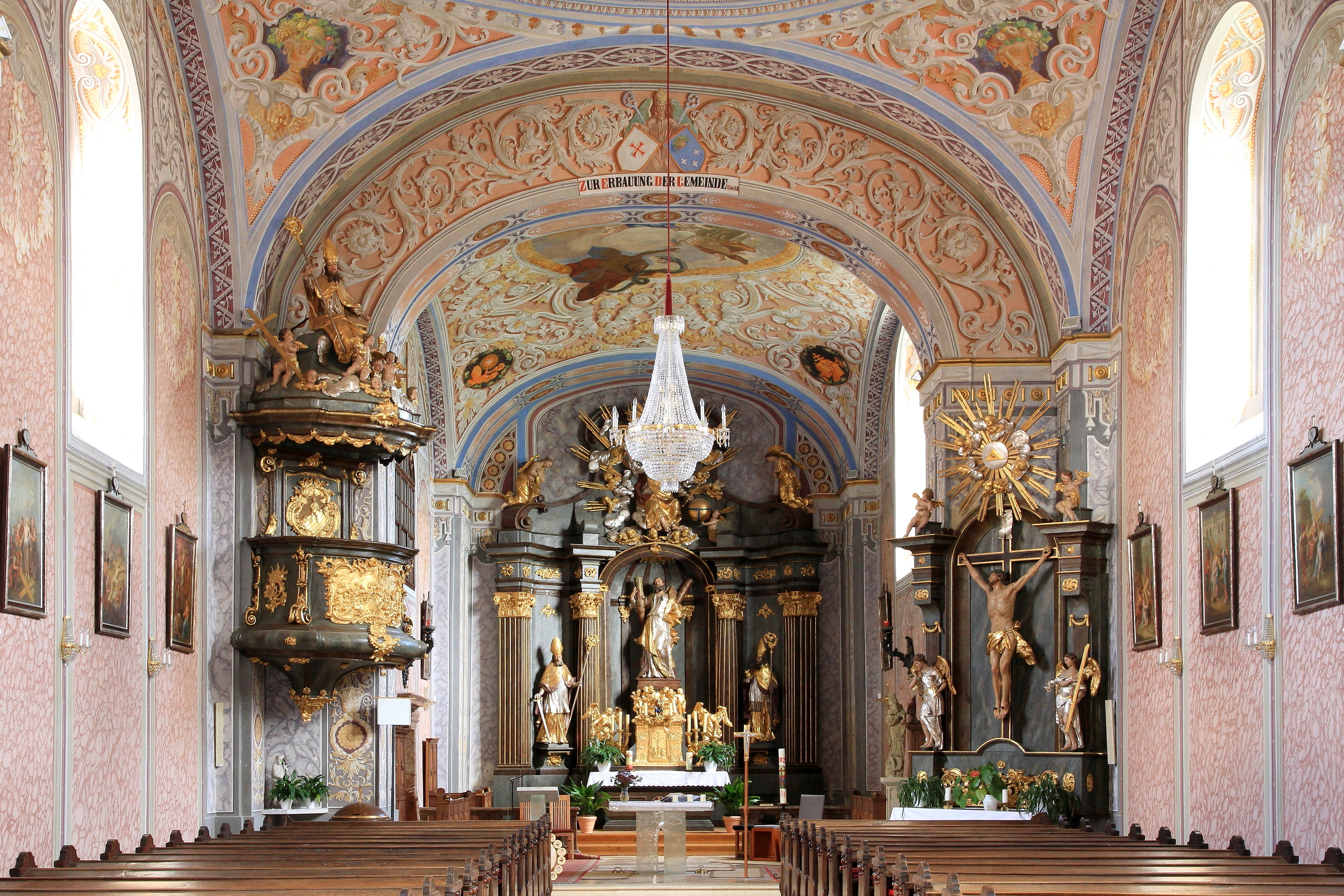

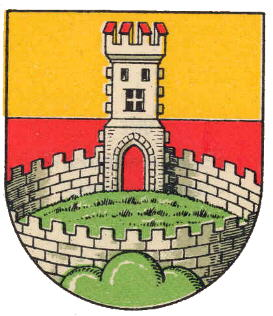
- Coat of arms

- Location within Austria
- Coordinates: 48°24′24″N 15°46′43″E
- Country: Austria
- State: Lower Austria
- District: Tulln

Government
  - Mayor: Alfred Riedl (ÖVP)

Area
  - Total: 46.44 km^{2} (17.93 sq mi)
- Elevation: 190 m (620 ft)

Population (2018-01-01)
  - Total: 3,132
  - Density: 67.44/km^{2} (174.7/sq mi)
- Time zone: UTC+1 (CET)
  - Summer (DST): UTC+2 (CEST)
- Postal code: 3484
- Area code: 02738
- Vehicle registration: TU
- Website: www.grafenwoerth.at

Grafenwörth is a municipality in the district of Tulln in the Austrian state of Lower Austria.

== Population ==
Historical population
Year	Pop.	±%
1971	2,280	—
1981	2,238	−1.8%
1991	2,404	+7.4%
2001	2,615	+8.8%
