= Großriedenthal =

- Municipality
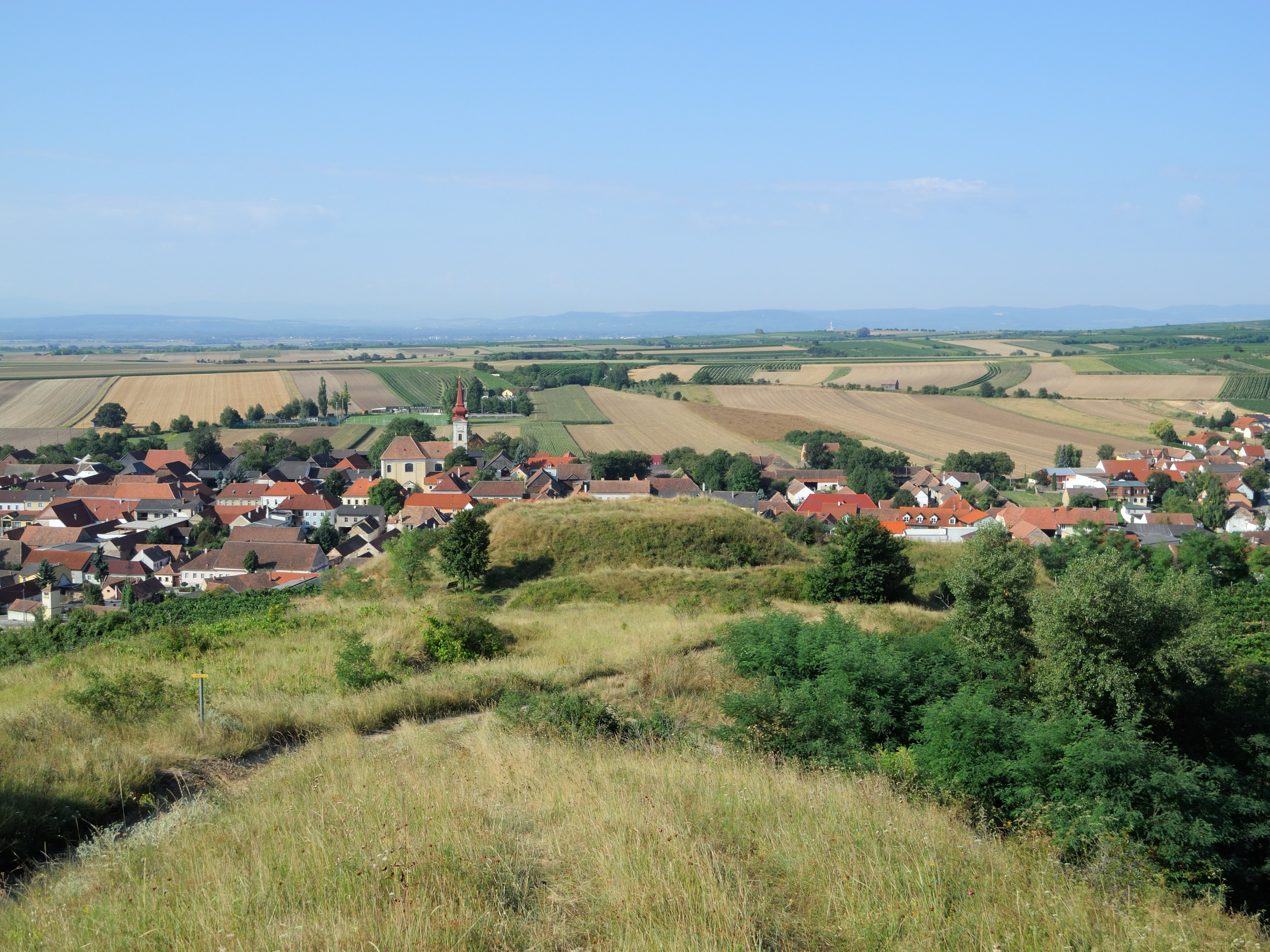
- View of Großriedenthal

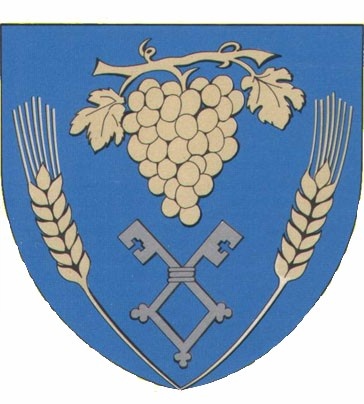
- Coat of arms

- Location within Austria
- Coordinates: 48°29′00″N 15°52′00″E
- Country: Austria
- State: Lower Austria
- District: Tulln

Government
  - Mayor: Franz Geier (ÖVP)

Area
  - Total: 18.83 km^{2} (7.27 sq mi)
- Elevation: 277 m (909 ft)

Population (2018-01-01)
  - Total: 899
  - Density: 47.7/km^{2} (124/sq mi)
- Time zone: UTC+1 (CET)
  - Summer (DST): UTC+2 (CEST)
- Postal code: 3471
- Area code: 02279
- Vehicle registration: TU
- Website: www.grossriedenthal.at

Großriedenthal is a municipality in the district of Tulln in Lower Austria, Austria. The community consists of 3 districts: Großriedenthal (483 inhabitants), Ottenthal (364 inhabitants), and Neudegg (237 inhabitants). The mild climate and fertile soil allow the region to produce both fruity and full-bodied wines. Grossriedenthal is in the wine district of Lower Austria about 50 km northwest of Vienna which is around one hour by car.

There are many botanical species native to the area that are not found anywhere else.

== Population ==
Historical population
Year	Pop.	±%
1971	1,043	—
1981	998	−4.3%
1991	998	+0.0%
2001	984	−1.4%
