= Kirchberg am Wagram =

- Municipality
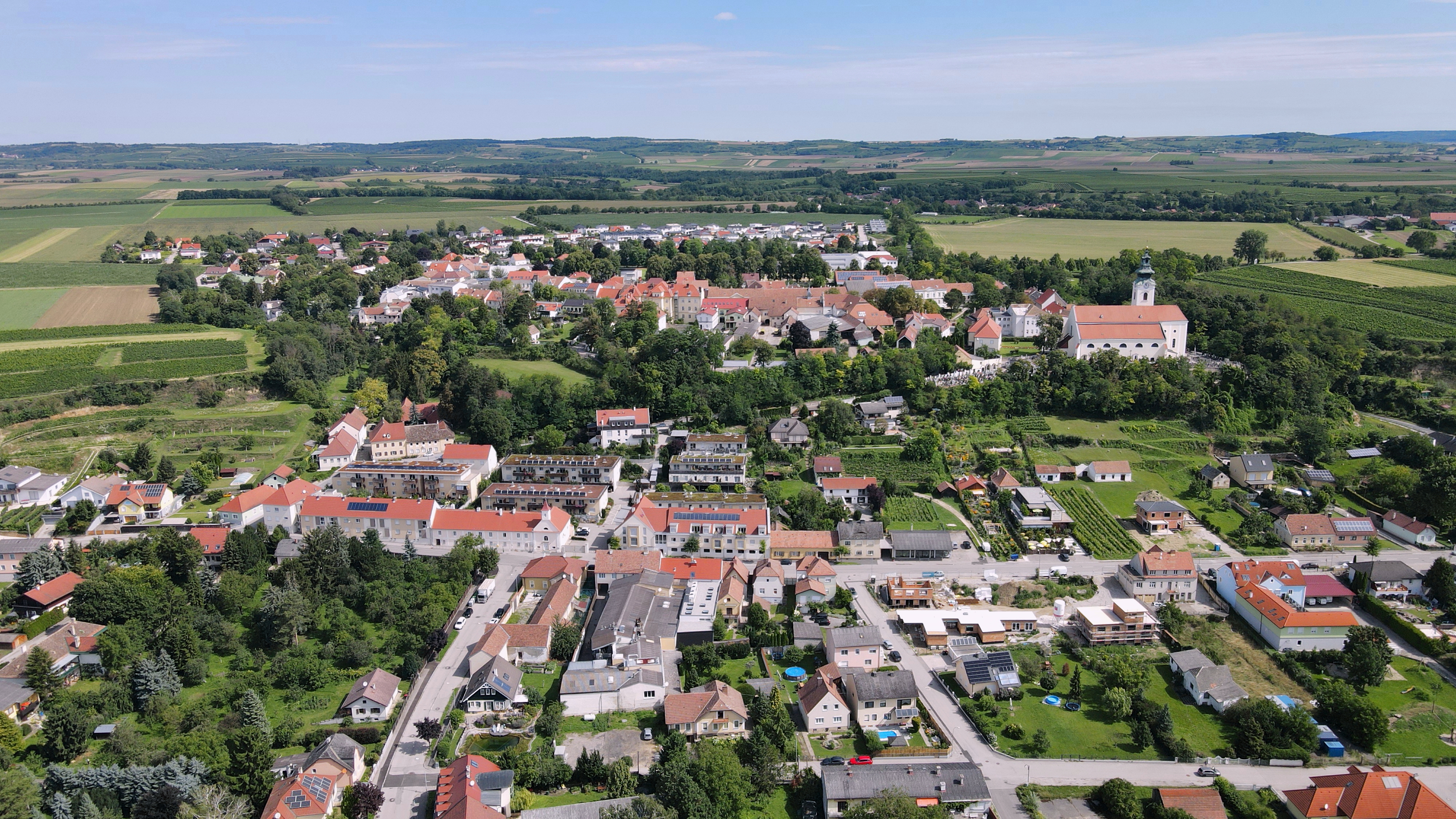
- Aerial view of Kirchberg am Wagram

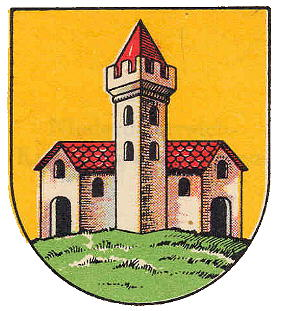
- Coat of arms

- Location within Austria
- Coordinates: 48°25′49″N 15°53′53″E
- Country: Austria
- State: Lower Austria
- District: Tulln

Government
  - Mayor: Johann Benedikt (ÖVP)

Area
  - Total: 60.32 km^{2} (23.29 sq mi)
- Elevation: 224 m (735 ft)

Population (2018-01-01)
  - Total: 3,670
  - Density: 60.8/km^{2} (158/sq mi)
- Time zone: UTC+1 (CET)
  - Summer (DST): UTC+2 (CEST)
- Postal code: 3470
- Area code: 02279
- Vehicle registration: TU
- Website: www.kirchberg-wagram.at

Kirchberg am Wagram is a municipality in the district of Tulln in the Austrian state of Lower Austria.

== Population ==
Historical population
Year	Pop.	±%
1971	3,314	—
1981	3,214	−3.0%
1991	3,206	−0.2%
2001	3,341	+4.2%
