= St. Andrä-Wördern =

- Municipality
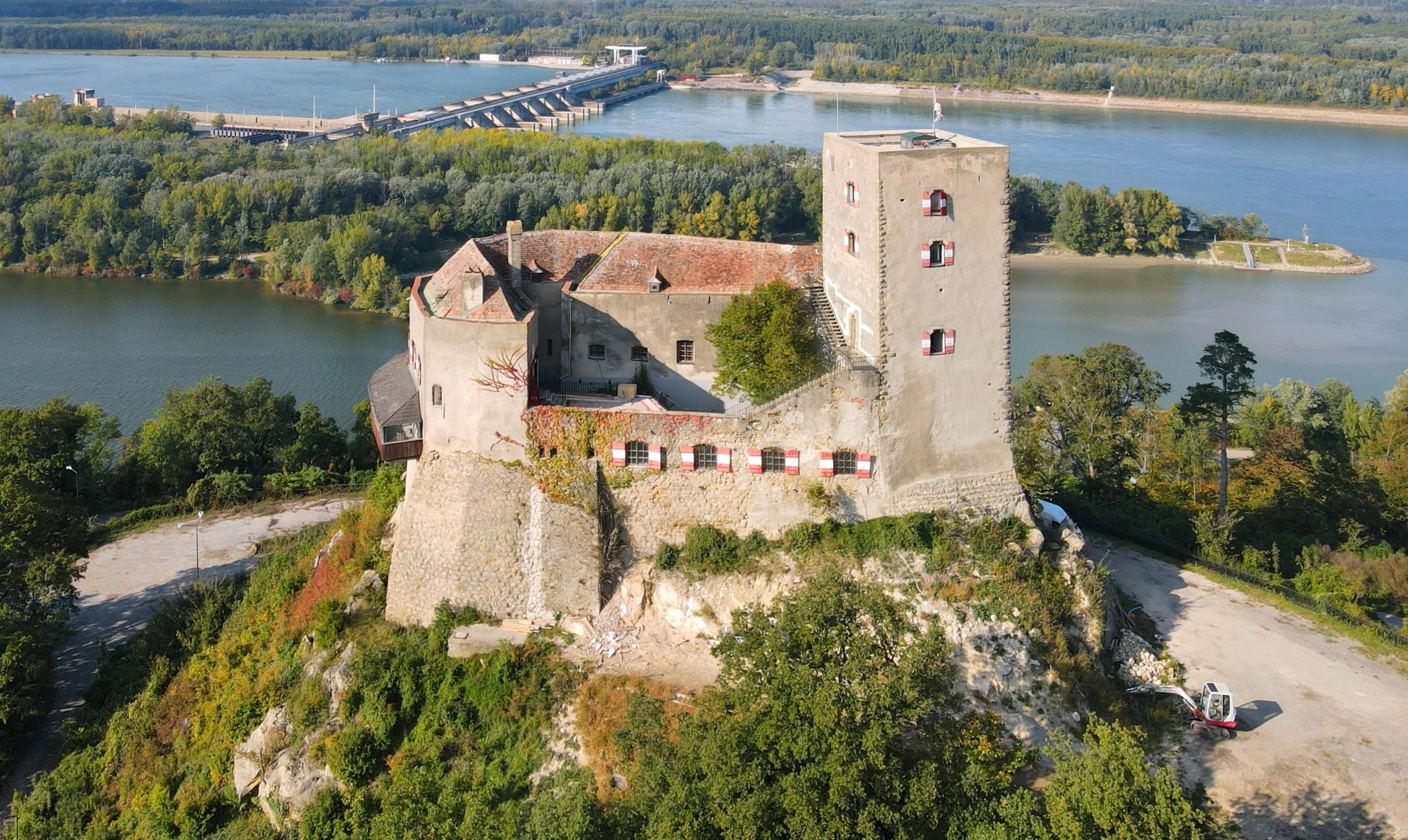
- Burg Greifenstein in Sankt Andrä-Wördern

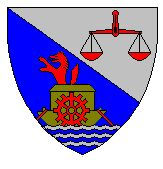
- Coat of arms

- Location within Austria
- Coordinates: 48°19′40″N 16°12′34″E
- Country: Austria
- State: Lower Austria
- District: Tulln

Government
  - Mayor: Maximilian Titz (OVP)

Area
  - Total: 39.34 km^{2} (15.19 sq mi)
- Elevation: 177 m (581 ft)

Population (2018-01-01)
  - Total: 7,870
  - Density: 200/km^{2} (518/sq mi)
- Time zone: UTC+1 (CET)
  - Summer (DST): UTC+2 (CEST)
- Postal code: 3423
- Area code: 02242
- Vehicle registration: TU
- Website: www.staw.at

Sankt Andrä-Wördern is a municipality in the district of Tulln in Lower Austria.

== History ==
The Romans maintained a fort here in the 1st century AD. Following their withdrawal, the area comprising the present-day municipality lay in the borderlands between Avar and Bavarian rule. Settlement of the village of Kirchbach began after the Frankish Emperor Charlemagne finally conquered the Avar realm in 803. The emerging settlement was situated within the territory of the Bavarian Ostland (Eastern March). Towards the end of the 8th century, the Germanic Franks built a "small church by the stream." Wördern is first mentioned in 1112, referred to as "Werdarin." This period saw the systematic colonization of the Tullnerfeld region; the linear villages found in Lower Austria date back to this era. The layout of these linear villages remains clearly discernible, particularly in Wördern. St. Andrä appears in the historical record around 1140 in a deed of gift to Klosterneuburg Abbey.

From 1185 to 1803, St. Andrä was owned by the Bishopric of Passau (a Roman Catholic diocese in eastern Bavaria) within the Holy Roman Empire of the German Nation. The town was looted and devastated during the Turkish invasion of 1683. Around 1803—following secularization and administrative reforms (specifically, its incorporation into the Habsburg hereditary lands)—it became part of the Archduchy of Austria; this final transfer occurred in the wake of the restructuring following the Reichsdeputationshauptschluss (Recess of the Imperial Deputation).

Municipal records indicate that in 1847, the population of St. Andrä consisted of 35 farmers, 16 winegrowers, and 30 other residents. The oldest house is the so-called "Moserhaus" at Wallenböckgasse 1.

In 1972, the municipalities of St. Andrä vor dem Hagenthale, Wördern, Greifenstein, Hintersdorf, and Kirchbach were merged, and the new municipality was named St. Andrä-Wördern.

== Population ==
Historical population
| Year | Pop. | ±% |
|---|---|---|
| 1971 | 4,675 | — |
| 1981 | 4,750 | +1.6% |
| 1991 | 5,404 | +13.8% |
| 2001 | 6,436 | +19.1% |

== Notable people ==
- Kurt Waldheim (1918–2007), born in Wördern, Austrian president and the fourth Secretary-General of the United Nations (1972–1981)
