= Muckendorf-Wipfing =

- Municipality
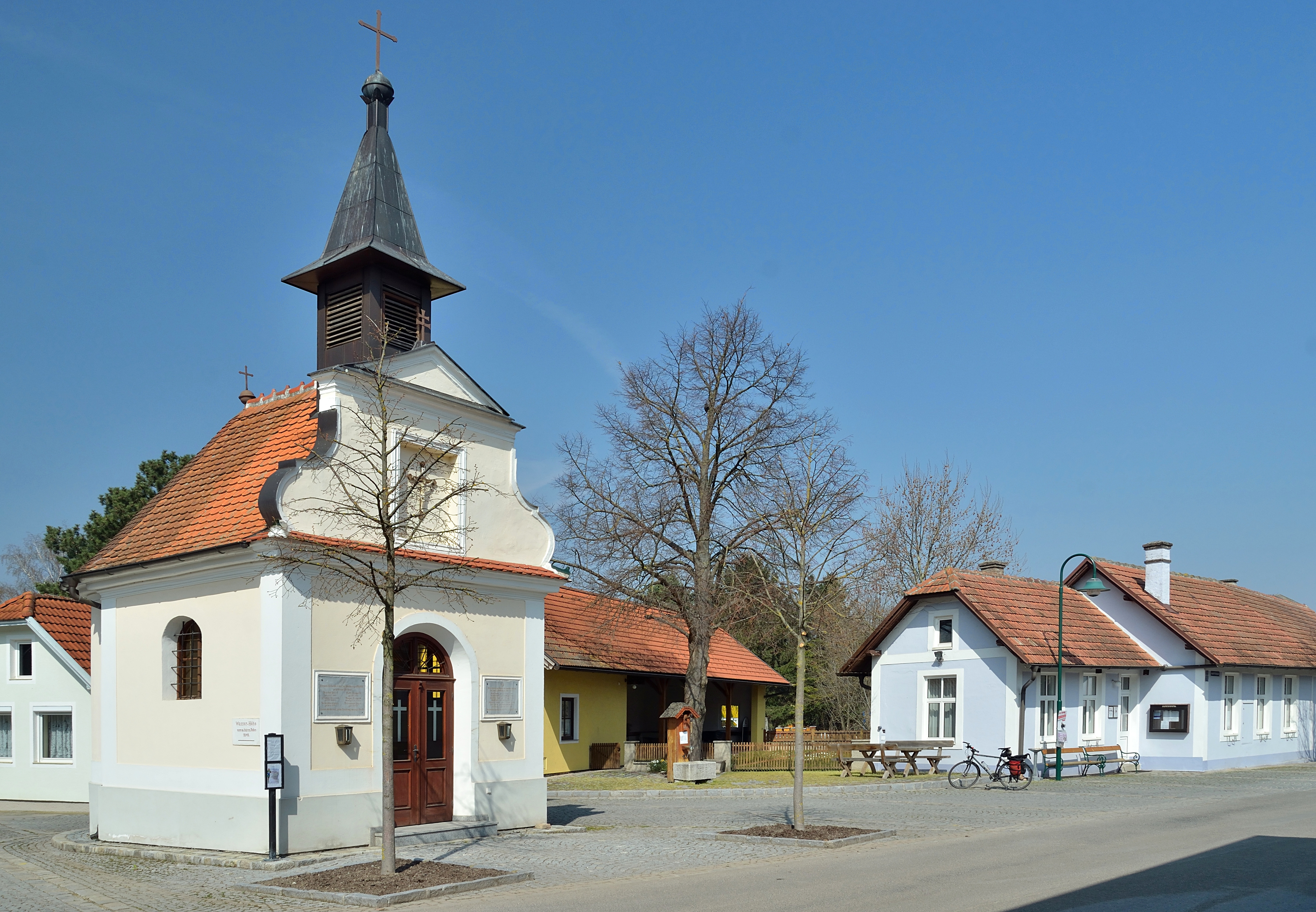
- Chapel in Wipfing

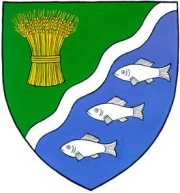
- Coat of arms

- Location within Austria
- Coordinates: 48°19′47″N 16°09′04″E
- Country: Austria
- State: Lower Austria
- District: Tulln

Government
  - Mayor: Hermann Grüssinger (WMW)

Area
  - Total: 6.34 km^{2} (2.45 sq mi)
- Elevation: 173 m (568 ft)

Population (2018-01-01)
  - Total: 1,573
  - Density: 248/km^{2} (643/sq mi)
- Time zone: UTC+1 (CET)
  - Summer (DST): UTC+2 (CEST)
- Postal code: 3426
- Area code: 02242
- Vehicle registration: TU
- Website: www.muckendorf-wipfing.at

Muckendorf-Wipfing is a municipality in the district of Tulln in the Austrian state of Lower Austria. On the south bank of the Danube, it is around 20 km northwest of Vienna.

== Population ==
Historical population
Year	Pop.	±%
1971	699	—
1981	719	+2.9%
1991	886	+23.2%
2001	980	+10.6%
