= Absdorf =

- Municipality
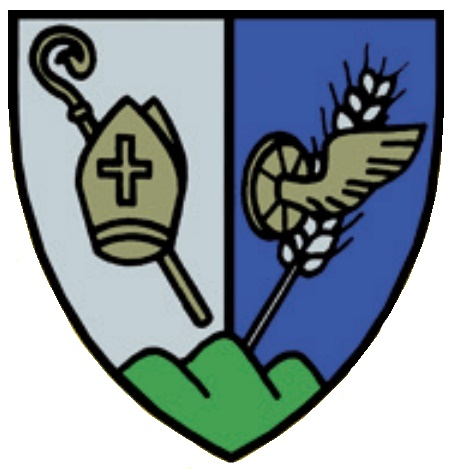
- Coat of arms

- Location within Austria
- Coordinates: 48°24′01″N 15°58′48″E
- Country: Austria
- State: Lower Austria
- District: Tulln

Government
  - Mayor: Sonja Mörth (SPÖ)

Area
  - Total: 15.98 km^{2} (6.17 sq mi)
- Elevation: 182 m (597 ft)

Population (2018-01-01)
  - Total: 2,087
  - Density: 130.6/km^{2} (338.3/sq mi)
- Time zone: UTC+1 (CET)
  - Summer (DST): UTC+2 (CEST)
- Postal code: 3462
- Area code: 02278
- Vehicle registration: TU
- Website: www.absdorf.gv.at

Absdorf is a municipality in the district of Tulln in the Austrian state of Lower Austria.

== Population ==
Historical population
| Year | Pop. | ±% |
|---|---|---|
| 1869 | 869 | — |
| 1880 | 1,019 | +17.3% |
| 1890 | 1,075 | +5.5% |
| 1900 | 1,220 | +13.5% |
| 1910 | 1,288 | +5.6% |
| 1923 | 1,409 | +9.4% |
| 1934 | 1,469 | +4.3% |
| 1939 | 1,468 | −0.1% |
| 1951 | 1,371 | −6.6% |
| 1961 | 1,353 | −1.3% |
| 1971 | 1,394 | +3.0% |
| 1981 | 1,361 | −2.4% |
| 1991 | 1,369 | +0.6% |
| 2001 | 1,605 | +17.2% |
| 2008 | 1,818 | +13.3% |

== Personalities ==
- Alois Benjamin Saliger
