= Königsbrunn am Wagram =

- Municipality
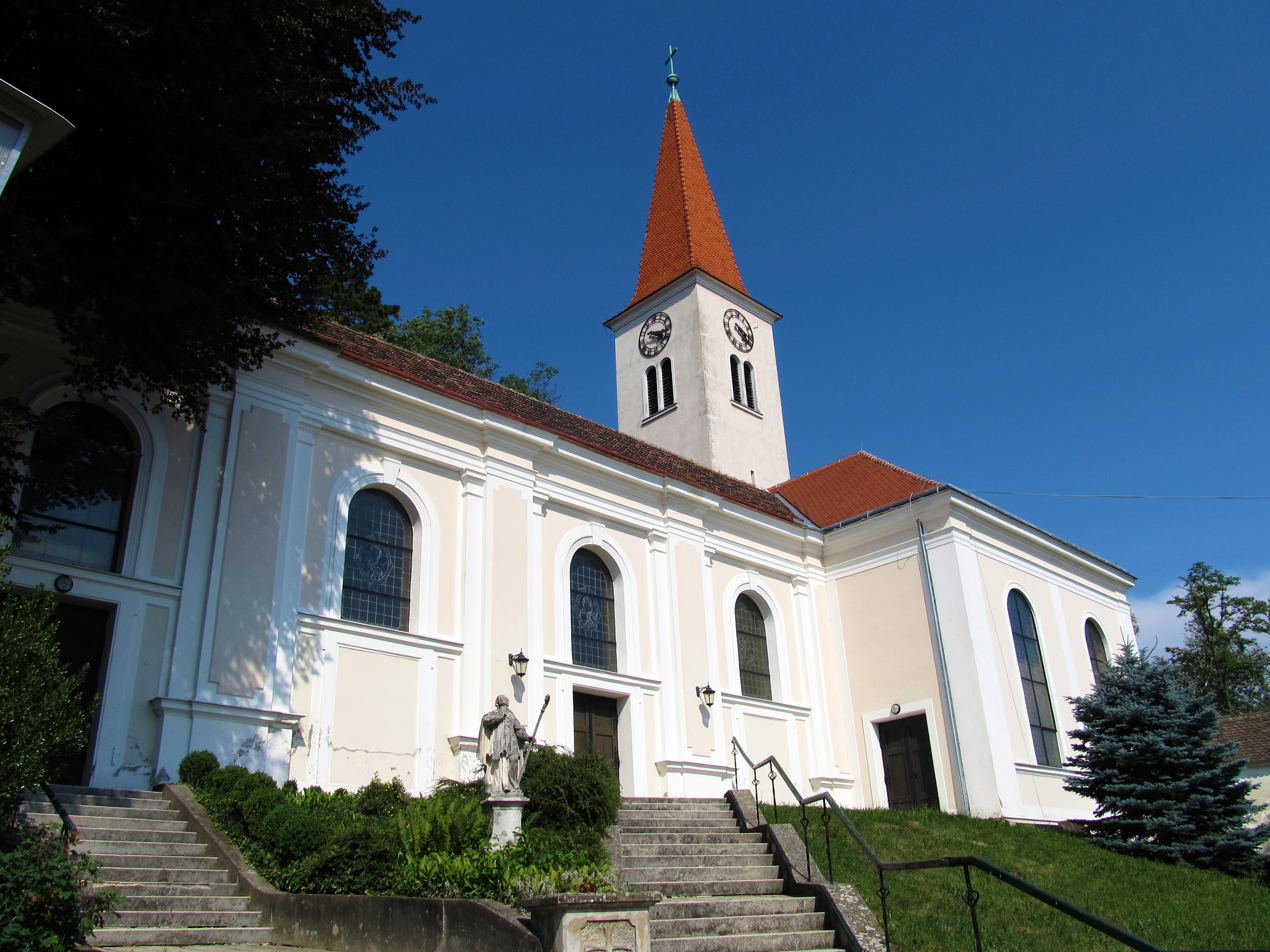
- Königsbrunn am Wagram parish church

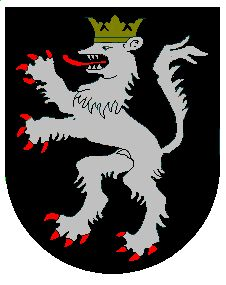
- Coat of arms

- Location within Austria
- Coordinates: 48°25′00″N 15°56′00″E
- Country: Austria
- State: Lower Austria
- District: Tulln

Government
  - Mayor: Karl Solich (ÖVP)

Area
  - Total: 28.59 km^{2} (11.04 sq mi)
- Elevation: 197 m (646 ft)

Population (2018-01-01)
  - Total: 1,319
  - Density: 46.14/km^{2} (119.5/sq mi)
- Time zone: UTC+1 (CET)
  - Summer (DST): UTC+2 (CEST)
- Postal code: 3465
- Area code: 02278
- Vehicle registration: TU
- Website: www.koenigsbrunn.at

Königsbrunn am Wagram is a municipality in the district of Tulln in the Austrian state of Lower Austria.

== Population ==
Historical population
| Year | Pop. | ±% |
|---|---|---|
| 1971 | 1,197 | — |
| 1981 | 1,178 | −1.6% |
| 1991 | 1,162 | −1.4% |
| 2001 | 1,270 | +9.3% |
