= Robert Laimer =

Austrian politician (born 1966)

Member of the National Council
- Incumbent
- Assumed office 9 November 2017
- Constituency: Lower Austria Centre

Personal details
- Born: 3 August 1966 (age 59) St. Pölten, Austria
- Party: Social Democratic Party
- Website: robertlaimer.at

Robert Laimer (born 3 August 1966) is an Austrian politician and member of the National Council. A member of the Social Democratic Party, he has represented Lower Austria Centre since November 2017.

Laimer was born on 3 August 1966 in St. Pölten. He worked for the Lower Austrian Regional Health Insurance Fund (Gebietskrankenkasse) from 1984 to 2003. He then worked for the Social Democratic Party (SPÖ), as District Manager in St. Pölten (2003-2013) and State Manager in Lower Austria (2013-2018).

Laimer joined Young Generation, the SPÖ's youth wing, in 1980. He has held various positions in the St. Pölten, St. Pölten District and Lower Austrian branches of the Young Generation and SPÖ since 1990. He was a member of the municipal council (gemeinderat) in St. Pölten from 2001 to 2005 and of the municipal board (stadtrat) in St. Pölten from 2005 to 2018. He was elected to the National Council at the 2017 legislative election.

Laimer is in a partnership and has two children.

Electoral history of Robert Laimer
Election	Electoral district	Party	Votes	%	Result
2017 legislative	Lower Austria Centre	Social Democratic Party	2,123	4.09%	Elected
2017 legislative	Lower Austria	Social Democratic Party	112	0.04%	Not elected
2017 legislative	Federal List	Social Democratic Party	46	0.00%	Not elected
2019 legislative	Lower Austria Centre	Social Democratic Party	2,383	6.15%	Elected
2019 legislative	Lower Austria	Social Democratic Party	156	0.08%	Not elected
2024 legislative	Lower Austria Centre	Social Democratic Party	2,976	7.25%	Elected
2024 legislative	Lower Austria	Social Democratic Party	359	0.17%	Not elected
2024 legislative	Federal List	Social Democratic Party	175	0.02%	Not elected
