= Sitzenberg-Reidling =

- Municipality
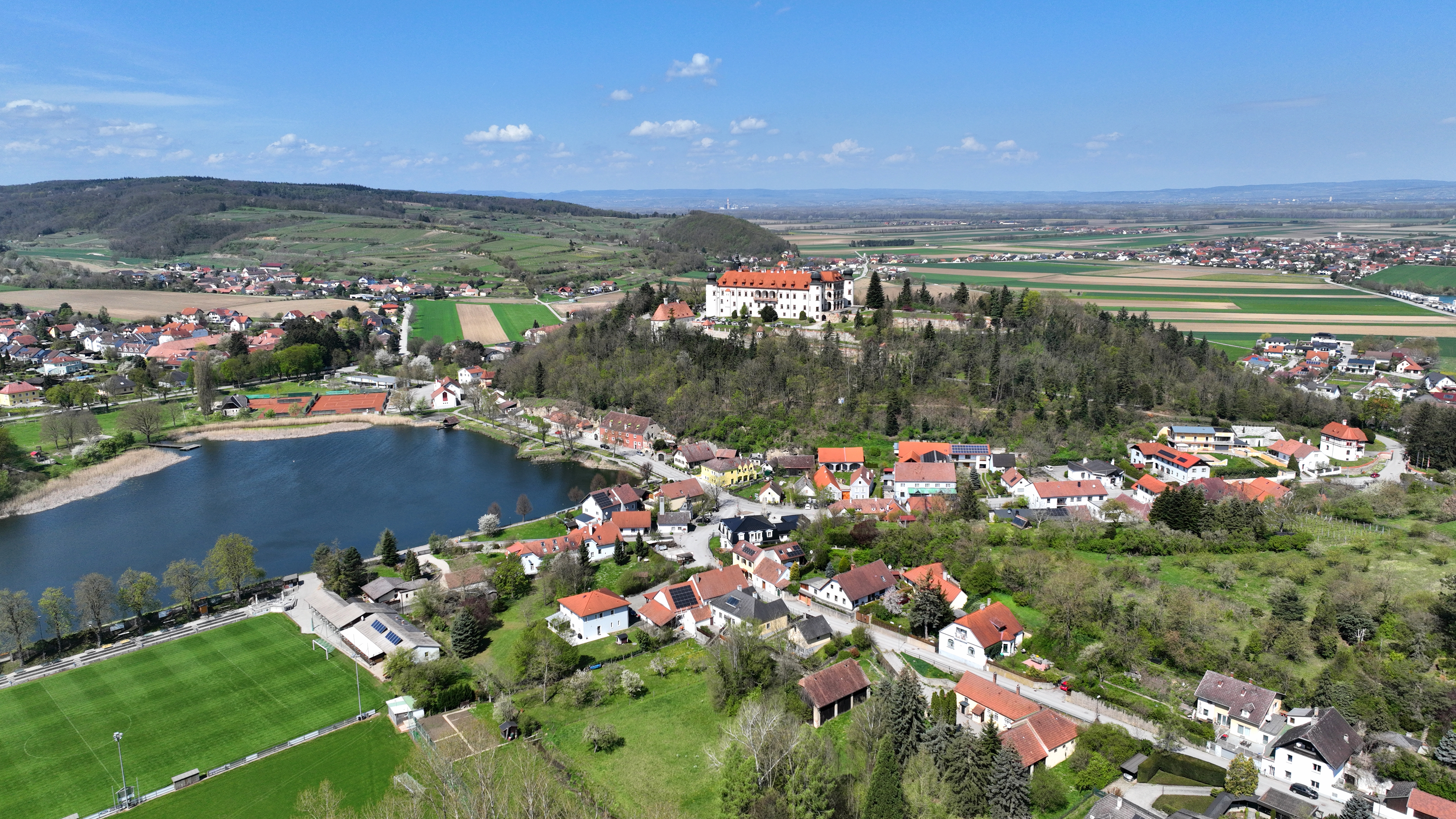
- Aerial view of Sitzenberg

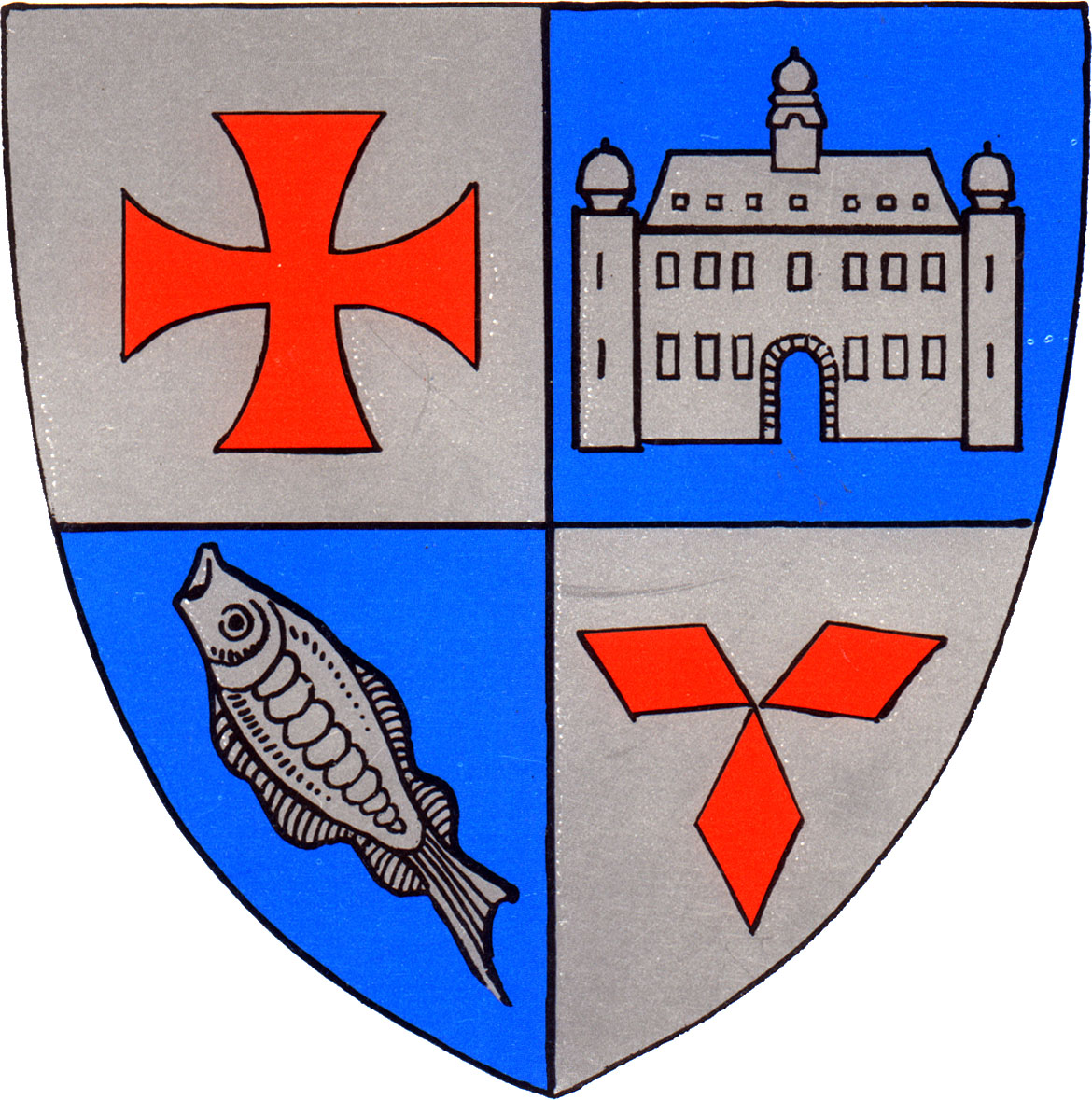
- Coat of arms

- Location within Austria
- Coordinates: 48°19′12″N 15°48′48″E
- Country: Austria
- State: Lower Austria
- District: Tulln

Government
  - Mayor: Franz Redl (ÖVP)

Area
  - Total: 22.15 km^{2} (8.55 sq mi)
- Elevation: 205 m (673 ft)

Population (2018-01-01)
  - Total: 2,102
  - Density: 94.90/km^{2} (245.8/sq mi)
- Time zone: UTC+1 (CET)
  - Summer (DST): UTC+2 (CEST)
- Postal code: 3454
- Area code: 02276
- Vehicle registration: TU
- Website: www.sitzenberg-reidling.gv.at

Sitzenberg-Reidling is a municipality in the district of Tulln in the Austrian state of Lower Austria.

== Population ==
Historical population
Year	Pop.	±%
1971	1,649	—
1981	1,732	+5.0%
1991	1,701	−1.8%
2001	1,921	+12.9%
