= Christian Hafenecker =

Austrian politician (born 1980)

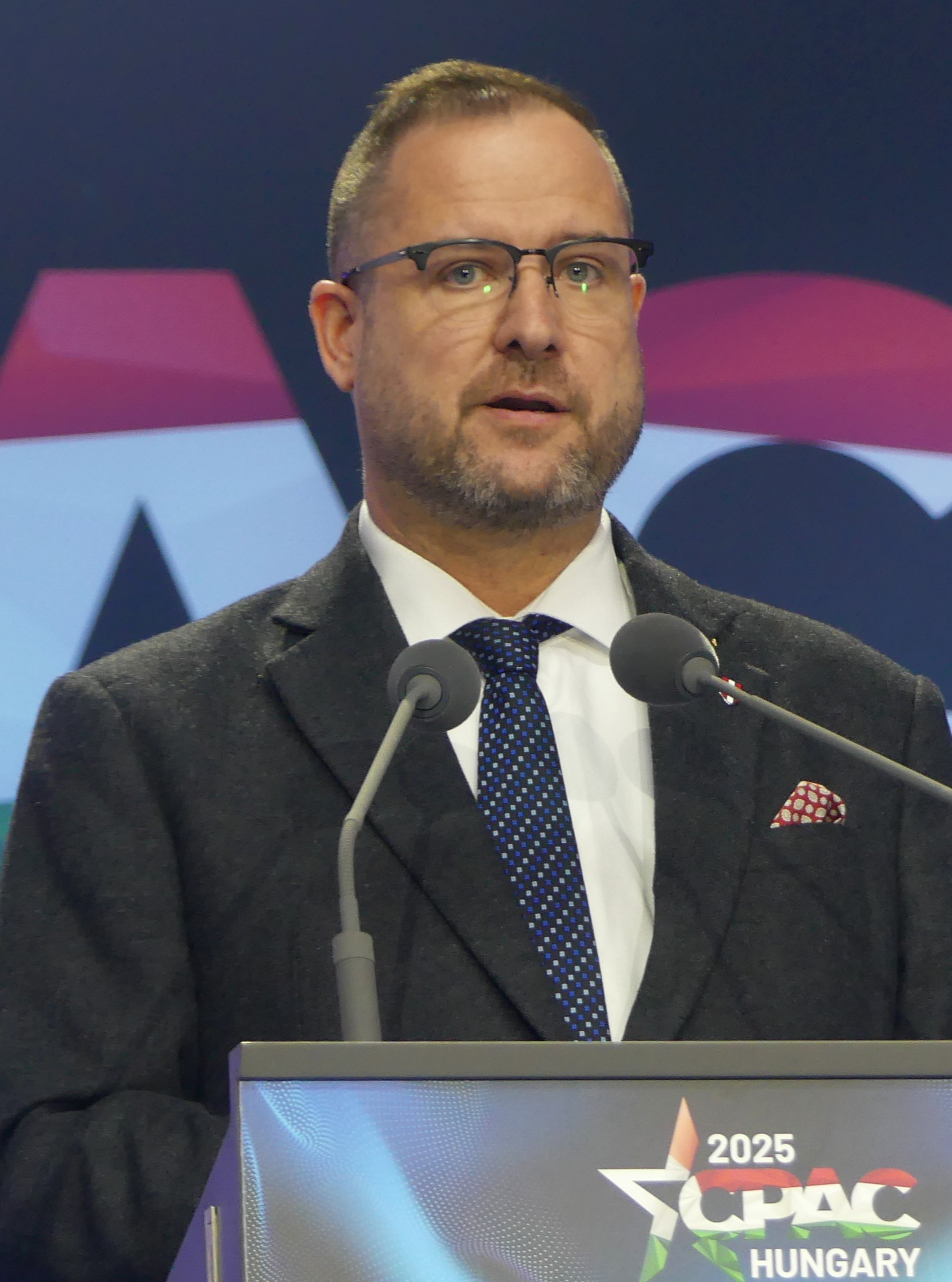

Secretary-General of the Freedom Party
- Incumbent
- Assumed office 14 May 2018 Serving with Harald Vilimsky
- Chairman: Heinz-Christian Strache; Norbert Hofer; Herbert Kickl
- Preceded by: Marlene Svazek

Personal details
- Born: 11 August 1980 (age 45) Mödling, Austria
- Party: Freedom Party of Austria

Christian Hafenecker (born 11 August 1980) is an Austrian politician who has been a member of the National Council for the Freedom Party (FPÖ) since 2013. He was also a former Member of the Federal Council. Since 2018 he is (together with Harald Vilimsky) one of the secretaries-general of his party.
