= Tulln District =

Coordinates: 48.330°N 15.980°E

Tulln District Bezirk Tulln
- District
- Country: Austria
- State: Lower Austria
- Number of municipalities: 22
- Administrative seat: Tulln an der Donau

Government
  - District Governor: Andreas Riemer

Area
  - Total: 734.0 km^{2} (283.4 sq mi)

Population (1 January 2016)
  - Total: 100,851
  - Density: 137.4/km^{2} (355.9/sq mi)
- Time zone: UTC+01:00 (CET)
  - Summer (DST): UTC+02:00 (CEST)
- Vehicle registration: TU

Bezirk Tulln is a district of the state of Lower Austria in Austria.

== Municipalities ==
Suburbs, hamlets, and other subdivisions of a municipality are indicated in small characters.

- Absdorf
  - Absberg
- Atzenbrugg
  - Atzenbrugg, Ebersdorf, Heiligeneich, Hütteldorf, Moosbierbaum, Tautendorf, Trasdorf, Watzendorf, Weinzierl
- Fels am Wagram
  - Fels am Wagram, Gösing am Wagram, Stettenhof, Thürnthal
- Grafenwörth
  - Feuersbrunn, Grafenwörth, Jettsdorf, Seebarn, St. Johann, Wagram am Wagram
- Großriedenthal
  - Großriedenthal, Neudegg, Ottenthal
- Großweikersdorf
  - Ameistal, Baumgarten am Wagram, Großweikersdorf, Großwiesendorf, Kleinwiesendorf, Ruppersthal, Tiefenthal
- Judenau-Baumgarten
  - Baumgarten am Tullnerfeld, Freundorf, Judenau, Zöfing
- Kirchberg am Wagram
  - Altenwörth, Dörfl, Engelmannsbrunn, Gigging, Kirchberg am Wagram, Kollersdorf, Mallon, Mitterstockstall, Neustift im Felde, Oberstockstall, Sachsendorf, Unterstockstall, Winkl
- Klosterneuburg
  - Höflein an der Donau, Kierling, Klosterneuburg, Kritzendorf, Maria Gugging, Weidling, Weidlingbach
- Königsbrunn am Wagram
  - Bierbaum am Kleebühel, Frauendorf an der Au, Hippersdorf, Königsbrunn am Wagram, Utzenlaa, Zaußenberg
- Königstetten
- Langenrohr
  - Asparn, Kronau, Langenrohr, Langenschönbichl, Neusiedl
- Michelhausen
  - Atzelsdorf, Michelhausen, Michelndorf, Mitterndorf, Pixendorf, Rust im Tullnerfeld, Spital, Streithofen
- Muckendorf-Wipfing
  - Muckendorf an der Donau, Wipfing
- Sieghartskirchen
  - Abstetten, Dietersdorf, Einsiedl, Elsbach, Flachberg, Gerersdorf, Gollarn, Henzing, Kogl, Kracking, Kreuth, Kronstein, Ollern, Öpping, Penzing, Plankenberg, Ranzelsdorf, Rappoltenkirchen, Reichersberg, Ried am Riederberg, Riederberg, Röhrenbach, Sieghartskirchen, Steinhäusl, Wagendorf, Weinzierl
- Sitzenberg-Reidling
  - Ahrenberg, Baumgarten, Eggendorf, Hasendorf, Neustift, Reidling, Sitzenberg, Thallern
- Sankt Andrä-Wördern
  - Altenberg, Greifenstein, Hadersfeld, Hintersdorf, Kirchbach, St. Andrä vor dem Hagenthale, Wördern
- Tulbing
  - Chorherrn, Katzelsdorf, Tulbing, Wilfersdorf
- Tulln an der Donau
  - Frauenhofen, Langenlebarn-Oberaigen, Langenlebarn-Unteraigen, Mollersdorf, Neuaigen, Nitzing, Staasdorf, Trübensee, Tulln an der Donau
- Würmla
  - Anzing, Diendorf, Egelsee, Gotthartsberg, Grub, Gumperding, Hankenfeld, Holzleiten, Jetzing, Mittermoos, Pöding, Saladorf, Untermoos, Waltendorf, Würmla
- Zeiselmauer-Wolfpassing
  - Wolfpassing, Zeiselmauer
- Zwentendorf
  - Bärndorf, Buttendorf, Dürnrohr, Erpersdorf, Kaindorf, Kleinschönbichl, Maria Ponsee, Oberbierbaum, Pischelsdorf, Preuwitz, Zwentendorf an der Donau

== Annexation ==
In 2017, Klosterneuburg became a part of the district when Wien-Umgebung District was defunct.
