= Heidemaria Onodi =

Armenian politician (born 1957)

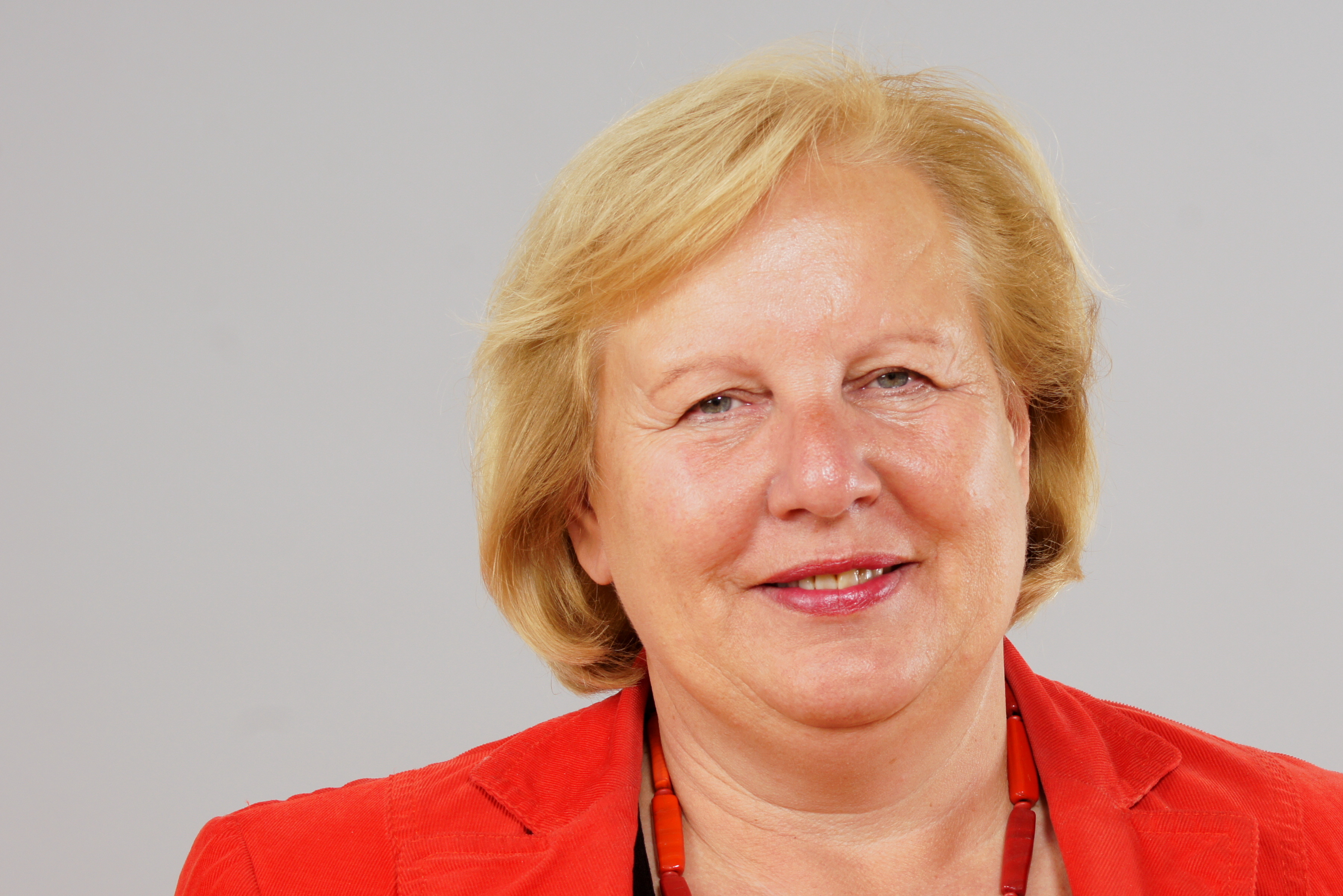
Heidemaria Onodi, 2013

Heidemaria Onodi (born August 23, 1957, in Doppel, municipality of Kirchstetten, Lower Austria) is a former Austrian politician. She was a member of the National Council from 1992 to 1998, a member of the Landtag of Lower Austria and second Landtagspräsidentin from 1998 to 2001, and state party leader of the SPÖ from 2001 to 2008 Lower Austria and Provincial Governor deputy and from 2008 to 2018 again Member of the Provincial Parliament of Lower Austria.

== Education and political career ==
Heidemaria Onodi is a diploma in health and nursing and also worked as a teacher for health and nursing. She began her political career in the 1980s years. In her home town of St. Pölten, she joined the Municipal Council in 1989, where she served until 1993.

As successor to Adelheid Praher, Onodi was a member of the National Council of the Republic of Austria from December 1, 1992, to March 31, 1998, as well as Member of the Provincial Parliament of Lower Austria. From 1998 to 2001, she also held the office of Second President of the Landtag von Niederösterreich. On May 5, 2001, she replaced Karl Schlögl as SPÖ Lower Austria party leader and also served as Deputy Governor from April 19, 2001.

On March 10, 2008, Onodi announced her resignation from all functions after the Lower Austrian SPÖ had suffered a historic loss of 7.91 percentage points in the state election the day before. With this step, she took responsibility for this defeat, but remained in politics as a member of the state parliament.

Her successor was the previous state executive Josef Leitner, who also took over the role of deputy governor from Onodi.

After the state election in Lower Austria 2018, she resigned from the state parliament.

== Private life ==
Heidemaria Onodi is widowed, her husband died on June 12, 2011.

== Awards (selection) ==
- Golden Commander's Cross with the Star of the Decoration of Honor for Services to the Province of Lower Austria (2010)
- Great Golden Decoration of Honor with the Star for Services to the Republic of Austria (2010)
- Viktor Adler Plaque of the SPÖ (2018)
- Dr. Herta Firnberg Medal (2023)
