= Administrative divisions of Austria-Hungary =

This article lists the administrative-territorial units of Austria-Hungary, a historical state that existed from 1867 to 1918.

Administrative divisions of Austria-Hungary
1. Bohemia
2. Bukovina
3. Carinthia
4. Carniola
5. Dalmatia
6. Galicia and Lodomeria
7. Austrian Littoral
8. Lower Austria
9. Moravia
10. Salzburg
11. Austrian Silesia
12. Styria
13. Tyrol
14. Upper Austria
15. Vorarlberg
16. Kingdom of Hungary (including Vojvodina and Transylvania)
17. Croatia and Slavonia

18. Bosnia and Herzegovina

In political terms, Austria-Hungary was divided into two parts: the Austrian lands, officially called the “Kingdoms and Lands Represented in the Imperial Council” (die im Reichsrate vertretenen Königreiche und Länder), governed through the Imperial Council (Reichsrat), and the Kingdom of Hungary, which included the historic lands of the Hungarian Crown and was subordinate to the Hungarian parliament and government.

Informally, these two parts were referred to as Cisleithania and Transleithania respectively. The annexed Condominium of Bosnia and Herzegovina in 1908 was not included in either Cisleithania or Transleithania and was administered by special governing authorities.

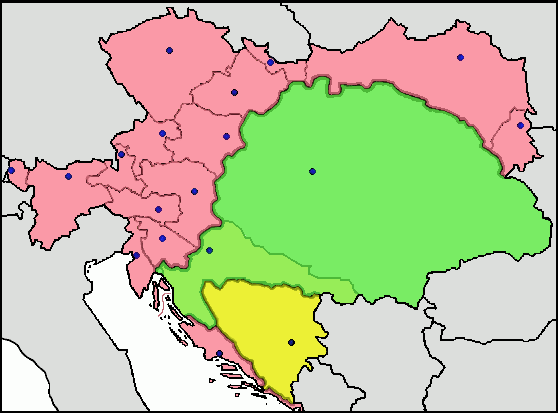
Austria-Hungary in 1878–1918: Cisleithania (Austrian part of the empire) Transleithania (Hungarian part of the empire) Condominium of Bosnia and Herzegovina (under joint administration from 1908)

In administrative terms, Austria-Hungary was divided into the following constituent parts (Crown Lands).

No.	Land	Capital
1	Cisleithania (Austrian Crown lands)	
1.1	Archduchy of Lower Austria (Erzherzogtum Österreich unter der Enns)	Vienna (Wien)
1.2	Archduchy of Upper Austria (Erzherzogtum Österreich ob der Enns)	Linz (Linz)
1.3	Duchy of Salzburg (Herzogtum Salzburg)	Salzburg (Salzburg)
1.4	Duchy of Styria (Herzogtum Steiermark)	Graz (Graz)
1.5	Duchy of Carinthia (Herzogtum Kärnten)	Klagenfurt (Klagenfurt)
1.6	Duchy of Carniola (Herzogtum Krain)	Ljubljana (Laibach)
1.7	Austrian Littoral	Trieste (Triest)
1.7.1	Princely County of Gorizia and Gradisca (Gefürstete Grafschaft Görz und Gradisca)	Gorizia (Görz)
1.7.2	Imperial Free City of Trieste (Reichsunmittelbare Stadt Triest und ihr Gebiet)	Trieste (Triest)
1.7.3	Margraviate of Istria (Markgrafschaft Istrien)	Poreč (Parenz)
1.8	Princely County of Tyrol (Gefürstete Grafschaft Tirol)	Innsbruck (Innsbruck)
1.9	Land of Vorarlberg (Land Vorarlberg)	Bregenz (Bregenz)
1.10	Kingdom of Bohemia (Königreich Böhmen)	Prague (Prag)
1.11	Margraviate of Moravia (Markgrafschaft Mähren)	Brno (Brünn)
1.12	Duchy of Austrian Silesia (Herzogtum Schlesien (Österreichisch-Schlesien))	Opava (Troppau)
1.13	Kingdom of Galicia and Lodomeria	Lviv (Lemberg)
1.14	Duchy of Bukovina	Chernivtsi (Czernowitz)
1.15	Kingdom of Dalmatia	Zadar (Zadar)
2	Transleithania (lands of the Hungarian Crown)	
2.1	Kingdom of Hungary	Budapest (Budapest)
2.2	Kingdom of Croatia-Slavonia	Zagreb (Agram)
2.3	City of Fiume	Rijeka (Sankt Veit an der Flaum)
3	Condominium of Bosnia and Herzegovina (from 1908)	Sarajevo (Sarajevo)

Map of the Leitha River showing the border between Cisleithania and Transleithania (coloured), as well as modern borders (black)

The representative bodies of the constituent parts (Hungary and Croatia) were the regional diets (Landtage), while the executive authorities were the regional governments, consisting of a regional prime minister and regional ministers.

The emperor in the crown lands was represented by the Statthalterei (Statthalterei). The representative bodies of the crown lands were the regional diets (Landtage), while the executive authorities were the regional committees (Landesausschuss), headed by the regional governor (Landeshauptmann) and regional councillors (Landesräte).

At district level, the imperial administration was represented by district captaincies (Bezirkshauptmannschaften). In cities, the representative bodies were municipal councils (Gemeinderäte), and the executive bodies were city councils (Stadträte), consisting of a mayor (Bürgermeister) and city councillors (Stadträte).

In municipalities, the representative bodies were municipal assemblies (Gemeindevertretungen), while the executive bodies were municipal committees (Gemeindeausschüsse), consisting of a mayor and municipal councillors.

The division of the crown lands into districts as of 1910 was as follows (settlements serving as seats of district courts are also indicated). Compared to 1875, the administrative division underwent significant changes.

== Cisleithania (Austrian Crown lands) ==
=== Lower Austria ===
23 districts (Bezirk), as well as the statutory cities (Städte mit eigenem Statut) of Vienna (the capital of the crown land and of the entire empire), Waidhofen an der Ybbs and Wiener Neustadt.

№	District (Politischer Bezirk)	Towns with district courts (Gerichtsbezirke) (the flag of the country to which the town currently belongs is indicated alongside)
1	Amstetten	Amstetten (Austria); Haag (Austria); Sankt Peter in der Au (Austria); Waidhofen an der Ybbs (Austria)
2	Baden	Baden (Austria); Pottenstein (Austria)
3	Bruck	Bruck an der Leitha (Austria); Hainburg an der Donau (Austria); Schwechat (Austria)
4	Floridsdorf-Umgebung	Groß-Enzersdorf (Austria); Wolkersdorf im Weinviertel (Austria)
5	Gänserndorf	Marchegg (Austria); Matzen-Raggendorf (Austria); Zistersdorf (Austria)
6	Gmünd	Gmünd (Austria); Litschau (Austria); Schrems (Austria); Weitra (Austria)
7	Hietzing-Umgebung	Liesing (Austria); Neulengbach (Austria); Purkersdorf (Austria)
8	Horn	Eggenburg (Austria); Geras (Austria); Horn (Austria)
9	Korneuburg	Korneuburg (Austria); Stockerau (Austria)
10	Krems	Gföhl (Austria); Krems an der Donau (Austria); Langenlois (Austria); Mautern an der Donau (Austria); Spitz (Austria)
11	Lilienfeld	Lilienfeld (Austria); Hainfeld (Austria)
12	Melk	Mank, Austria; Melk (Austria); Ybbs an der Donau (Austria)
13	Mistelbach	Feldsberg (now Valtice) (Czech Republic); Laa an der Thaya (Austria); Mistelbach (Austria); Poysdorf (Austria)
14	Mödling	Ebreichsdorf (Austria); Mödling (Austria)
15	Neunkirchen	Gloggnitz (Austria); Neunkirchen (Austria)
16	Oberhollabrunn	Haugsdorf (Austria); Hollabrunn (Austria); Ravelsbach (Austria); Retz (Austria)
17	Pöggstall	Ottenschlag (Austria); Persenbeug-Gottsdorf (Austria); Pöggstall (Austria)
18	Sankt Pölten	Herzogenburg (Austria); Kirchberg an der Pielach (Austria); Sankt Pölten (Austria)
19	Scheibbs	Gaming (Austria); Scheibbs (Austria)
20	Tulln	Atzenbrugg (Austria); Kirchberg am Wagram (Austria); Klosterneuburg (Austria); Tulln an der Donau (Austria)
21	Waidhofen an der Thaya	Dobersberg (Austria); Raabs an der Thaya (Austria); Waidhofen an der Thaya (Austria)
22	Wiener Neustadt	Aspang-Markt (Austria); Gutenstein (Austria); Kirchschlag in der Buckligen Welt (Austria); Wiener Neustadt (Austria)
23	Zwettl	Allentsteig (Austria); Groß Gerungs (Austria); Zwettl (Austria)

=== Upper Austria ===
12 districts subordinate to the governorship in Linz (German: Statthalterei), as well as statutory cities Linz (capital of the crown land) and Steyr.

No.	District (Politischer Bezirk)	Towns with district courts (Gerichtsbezirke) (the current sovereign state of the town is indicated by the adjacent flag)
1	Braunau	Braunau am Inn (Austria); Mattighofen (Austria); Mauerkirchen (Austria); Wildshut (Austria)
2	Eferding	Eferding (Austria); Waizenkirchen (Austria)
3	Freistadt	Freistadt (Austria); Pregarten (Austria); Unterweißenbach (Austria)
4	Gmunden	Bad Ischl (Austria); Gmunden (Austria)
5	Grieskirchen	Grieskirchen (Austria); Haag am Hausruck (Austria); Peuerbach (Austria)
6	Kirchdorf	Grünburg (Austria); Kirchdorf an der Krems (Austria); Windischgarsten (Austria)
7	Linz	Enns (Austria); Linz (Austria); Sankt Florian (Austria); Neuhofen an der Krems (Austria)
8	Perg	Grein (Austria); Mauthausen (Austria); Perg (Austria)
9	Ried im Innkreis	Obernberg am Inn (Austria); Ried im Innkreis (Austria)
10	Rohrbach	Aigen (Austria); Haslach (Austria); Lembach (Austria); Neufelden (Austria); Rohrbach (Austria)
11	Schärding	Engelhartszell (Austria); Raab (Austria); Schärding (Austria)
12	Steyr	Kremsmünster (Austria); Steyr (Austria); Weyer (Austria)
13	Urfahr	Bad Leonfelden (Austria); Ottensheim (Austria); Urfahr (Austria)
14	Vöcklabruck	Frankenmarkt (Austria); Mondsee (Austria); Schwanenstadt (Austria); Vöcklabruck (Austria)
15	Wels	Wels (Austria); Lambach (Austria)

=== Salzburg ===
The crown land Salzburg was divided into 4 district authorities (German: Bezirkshauptmannschaften), subordinate to the Landespresidium in Salzburg. Salzburg was a statutory city.

No.	District (Politischer Bezirk)	Towns with district courts (Gerichtsbezirke) (the current sovereign state of the town is indicated by the adjacent flag)
1	Hallein	Abtenau (Austria); Golling (Austria); Hallein (Austria)
2	Salzburg	Mattsee (Austria); Neumarkt (Austria); Oberndorf (Austria); Salzburg (Austria); St. Gilgen (Austria); Thalgau (Austria)
3	St. Johann	Bad Hofgastein (Austria); Radstadt (Austria); St. Johann (Austria); Werfen (Austria)
4	Tamsweg	Sankt Michael (Austria); Tamsweg (Austria)
5	Zell	Lofer (Austria); Mittersill (Austria); Saalfelden (Austria); Taxenbach (Austria); Zell am See (Austria)

=== Styria ===
22 district commissions (German: Bezirkhauptmannschaften), subordinate to the governorate in Graz (the capital of the crown land), as well as the statutory cities of Graz, Cilli (now Celje), Marburg (now Maribor) and Pettau (now Ptuj).

No.	District (Politischer Bezirk)	Towns with district courts (Gerichtsbezirke) (the current sovereign state of the town is indicated by the adjacent flag)
1	Bruck	Aflenz (Austria); Bruck an der Mur (Austria); Mariazell (Austria)
2	Cilli (Landbezirk)	Cilli (Celje) (Slovenia); Franz (Vransko) (Slovenia); Oberburg (Gornji Grad) (Slovenia); Sankt Marein (Šmarje pri Jelšah) (Slovenia); Tüffer (Laško) (Slovenia)
3	Deutschlandsberg	Deutschlandsberg (Austria); Eibiswald (Austria); Stainz (Austria)
4	Feldbach	Fehring (Austria); Feldbach (Austria); Fürstenfeld (Austria); Kirchbach (Austria)
5	Gonobitz (Slovenske Konjice) (Slovenia)	
6	Graz (Landbezirk)	Frohnleiten (Austria); Graz-Umgebung (Austria)
7	Gröbming	Bad Aussee (Austria); Gröbming (Austria); Irdning (Austria); Schladming (Austria)
8	Hartberg	Friedberg (Austria); Hartberg (Austria); Pöllau (Austria); Vorau (Austria)
9	Judenburg	Judenburg (Austria); Knittelfeld (Austria); Obdach (Austria); Ober-Zeiring (Austria)
10	Leibnitz	Arnfels (Austria); Leibnitz (Austria); Wildon (Austria)
11	Leoben	Eisenerz (Austria); Leoben (Austria); Mautern (Austria)
12	Liezen	Liezen (Austria); Rottenmann (Austria); Sankt Gallen (Austria)
13	Luttenberg	Luttenberg (Ljutomer) (Slovenia); Oberradkersburg (Gornja Radgona) (Slovenia)
14	Marburg (Landbezirk)	Marburg (Maribor) (Slovenia); Sankt Leonhard in Windischbüheln (Lenart v Slovenskih Goricah) (Slovenia); Windisch-Feistritz (Slovenska Bistrica) (Slovenia)
15	Mürzzuschlag	Kindberg (Austria); Mürzzuschlag (Austria)
16	Murau	Murau (Austria); Neumarkt (Austria); Oberwölz (Austria)
17	Pettau (Landbezirk)	Friedau (Ormož) (Slovenia); Pettau (Ptuj) (Slovenia); Rohitsch (Rogatec) (Slovenia)
18	Radkersburg	Mureck (Austria); Radkersburg (Austria)
19	Rann	Drachenburg (Kozje) (Slovenia); Lichtenwald (Sevnica) (Slovenia); Rann (Brežice) (Slovenia)
20	Voitsberg (Austria)	
21	Weiz	Birkfeld (Austria); Gleisdorf (Austria); Weiz (Austria)
22	Windischgrätz	Marenberg (Radlje ob Dravi) (Slovenia); Schönstein (Šoštanj) (Slovenia); Windischgrätz (Slovenj Gradec) (Slovenia)

=== Carinthia ===
7 districts, the capital of the crown land and the only statutory city (Stadt mit eigenem Statut) — Klagenfurt.

No.	District (Politischer Bezirk)	Towns with district courts (Gerichtsbezirke) (the current sovereign state of the town is indicated by the adjacent flag)
1	Hermagor	Hermagor (Austria); Kötschach (Austria)
2	Klagenfurt (Landbezirk)	Feldkirchen (Austria); Ferlach (Austria); Klagenfurt (Austria)
3	Sankt Veit	Althofen (Austria); Eberstein (Austria); Friesach (Austria); Gurk (Austria); Sankt Veit (Austria)
4	Spittal	Gmünd (Austria); Greifenburg (Austria); Millstatt (Austria); Obervellach (Austria); Spittal (Austria); Winklern (Austria)
5	Villach	Arnoldstein (Austria); Paternion (Austria); Rosegg (Austria); Tarvis (Tarvisio) (Italy); Villach (Austria)
6	Völkermarkt	Bleiburg (Austria); Eberndorf (Austria); Eisenkappel (Austria); Völkermarkt (Austria)
7	Wolfsberg	Sankt Leonhard (Austria); Sankt Paul (Austria); Wolfsberg (Austria)

=== Carniola ===
11 districts, the capital of the crown land — the statutory city (Stadt mit eigenem Statut) of Laibach (now Ljubljana, Slovenia).

No.	District (Politischer Bezirk)	Towns with district courts (Gerichtsbezirke) (the current sovereign state of the town is indicated by the adjacent flag)
1	Adelsberg	Adelsberg (Postojna) (Slovenia); Illyrisch-Feistritz (Ilirska Bistrica) (Slovenia); Senosetsch (Senožeče) (Slovenia); Wippach (Vipava) (Slovenia)
2	Gottschee	Gottschee (Kočevje) (Slovenia); Großlaschnitz (Velike Lašče) (Slovenia); Reifnitz (Ribnica) (Slovenia)
3	Gurkfeld	Gurkfeld (Krško) (Slovenia); Landstraß (Kostanjevica) (Slovenia); Nassenfuß (Mokronog) (Slovenia); Ratschach (Radeče) (Slovenia)
4	Krainburg	Bischoflack (Škofja Loka) (Slovenia); Krainburg (Kranj) (Slovenia); Neumarktl (Tržič) (Slovenia)
5	Laibach (Landbezirk)	Laibach (Ljubljana) (Slovenia); Oberlaibach (Vrhnika) (Slovenia)
6	Littai	Littai (Litija) (Slovenia); Weichselburg (Višnja Gora) (Slovenia)
7	Loitsch	Idria (Idrija) (Slovenia); Laas (Lož) (Slovenia); Loitsch (Logatec) (Slovenia); Zirknitz (Cerknica) (Slovenia)
8	Radmannsdorf	Kronau (Kranjska Gora) (Slovenia); Radmannsdorf (Radovljica) (Slovenia)
9	Rudolfswerth	Rudolfswerth (Novo Mesto) (Slovenia); Seisenberg (Žužemberk) (Slovenia); Treffen (Trebnje) (Slovenia)
10	Stein	Egg (Brdo pri Lukovici) (Slovenia); Stein (Kamnik) (Slovenia)
11	Tschernembl	Möttling (Metlika) (Slovenia); Tschernembl (Črnomelj) (Slovenia)

=== Austrian Littoral ===
The crown land of the Austrian Littoral (German: Küstenland) consisted of three parts:

- the city of Trieste and its surroundings,
- the Princely County of Gorizia and Gradisca,
- the Margraviate of Istria.

All of them were subordinate to the governorate (German: Statthalterei) in Trieste, namely 12 districts (German: Bezirkhauptmannschaften).

No.	District (Politischer Bezirk)	Towns with district courts (Gerichtsbezirke) (the current sovereign state of the town is indicated by the adjacent flag)
Princely County of Gorizia and Gradisca Statutory city (Stadt mit eigenem Statut) — Görz (Gorizia).
1	Görz	Canale (Kanal ob Soči) (Slovenia); Görz (Gorizia) (Italy); Haidenschaft (Ajdovščina) (Slovenia)
2	Gradisca	Cormons (Cormons) (Italy); Gradisca (Gradisca d'Isonzo) (Italy)
3	Monfalcone	Cervignano (Cervignano del Friuli) (Italy); Monfalcone (Italy)
4	Sesana	Komen (Slovenia); Sesana (Sežana) (Slovenia)
5	Tolmein	Flitsch (Bovec) (Slovenia); Karfreit (Kobarid) (Slovenia); Kirchheim (Cerkno) (Slovenia); Tolmein (Tolmin) (Slovenia)
Margraviate of Istria Statutory city (Stadt mit eigenem Statut) — Rovigno (Rovinj).
6	Capodistria	Capodistria (Koper) (Slovenia); Pinguente (Buzet) (Croatia); Pirano (Piran) (Slovenia)
7	Lussin	Cherso (Cres) (Croatia); Lussin (Mali Lošinj) (Croatia)
8	Mitterburg, Pisino	Albona (Labin) (Croatia); Mitterburg, Pisino (Pazin) (Croatia)
9	Parenzo	Buje (Croatia); Montona (Motovun) (Croatia); Parenzo (Poreč) (Croatia)
10	Pola	Dignano (Vodnjan) (Croatia); Pola (Pula) (Croatia); Rovigno (Rovinj) (Croatia)
11	Veglia (Krk) (Croatia)	
12	Volosca-Abbazia	Castelnuovo (Podgrad) (Slovenia); Volosca (Opatija) (Croatia)

=== Tyrol ===
The crown land of Tyrol was divided into 23 districts and 4 statutory cities (Städte mit eigenem Statut) having district status (Innsbruck, Bozen (Bolzano), Trient (Trento), and Rovereto).

No.	District (Politischer Bezirk)	Towns with district courts (Gerichtsbezirke) (the current sovereign state of the town is indicated by the adjacent flag)
1	Ampezzo	Ampezzo (Cortina d'Ampezzo) (Italy); Buchenstein (Livinallongo del Col di Lana) (Italy)
2	Borgo	Borgo (Italy); Levico (Italy); Strigno (Italy)
3	Bozen (Landbezirk)	Bozen (Bolzano) (Italy); Kaltern (Caldaro) (Italy); Kastelruth (Castelrotto) (Italy); Klausen (Chiusa) (Italy); Neumarkt (Egna) (Italy); Sarntal (Sarentino) (Italy)
4	Brixen	Brixen (Bressanone) (Italy); Sterzing (Vipiteno) (Italy)
5	Bruneck	Bruneck (Brunico) (Italy); Enneberg (San Vigilio di Marebbe) (Italy); Taufers (Campo Tures) (Italy); Welsberg (Monguelfo-Tesido) (Italy)
6	Cavalese	Cavalese (Italy); Vigo di Fassa (Italy)
7	Cles	Cles (Italy); Fondo (Italy); Malé (Italy)
8	Imst	Imst (Austria); Silz (Austria)
9	Innsbruck (Landbezirk)	Hall (Austria); Innsbruck (Austria); Mieders (Austria); Steinach (Austria); Telfs (Austria)
10	Kitzbühel	Hopfgarten (Austria); Kitzbühel (Austria)
11	Kufstein	Kufstein (Austria); Rattenberg (Austria)
12	Landeck	Landeck (Austria); Ried (Austria); Nauders (Austria)
13	Lienz	Lienz (Austria); Sillian (Austria); Windisch-Matrei (Matrei in Osttirol) (Austria)
14	Meran	Lana (Italy); Meran (now Merano) (Italy); Passeier (now San Leonardo in Passiria) (Italy)
15	Mezzo-Lombardo	Mezzolombardo (Italy)
16	Primiero	Primiero (Italy)
17	Reutte	Reutte (Austria)
18	Riva	Arco (Italy); Riva (Italy); Val di Ledro (Italy)
19	Rovereto	Ala (Italy); Mori (Italy); Rovereto (Italy); Villa Lagarina (Italy)
20	Schlanders	Glurns (Glorenza) (Italy); Schlanders (Silandro) (Italy)
21	Schwaz	Fügen (Austria); Schwaz (Austria); Zell am Ziller (Austria)
22	Tione	Condino (Italy); Stenico (Italy); Tione (Italy)
23	Trient	Cembra (Italy); Civezzano (Italy); Lavis (Italy); Pergine (Italy); Trient (Trento) (Italy); Vezzano (Italy)

=== Vorarlberg ===
No.	District (Politischer Bezirk)	Towns with district courts (Gerichtsbezirke) (the current sovereign state of the town is indicated by the adjacent flag)
1	Bludenz	Bludenz (Austria); Montafon, district centre — Schruns (Austria)
2	Bregenz	Bregenz (Austria); Bezau (Austria)
3	Feldkirch	Dornbirn (Austria); Feldkirch (Austria)

=== Bohemia ===
The Crown Land of Bohemia consisted of 104 districts subordinate to the governor's office in Prague; it also included 2 statutory cities (Städte mit eigenem Statut) — the crown land capital Prague and Reichenberg (now Liberec, Czech Republic).

No.	District (Politischer Bezirk)	Towns with district courts (Gerichtsbezirke) (the current sovereign state of the town is indicated by the adjacent flag)
1	Asch	Aš (Czech Republic)
2	Aussig	Aussig (Ústí nad Labem) (Czech Republic); Karbitz (Chabařovice) (Czech Republic)
3	Beneschau	Beneschau (Benešov) (Czech Republic); Neweklau (Neveklov) (Czech Republic); Vlašim (Czech Republic)
4	Bischofteinitz	Bischofteinitz (Horšovský Týn) (Czech Republic); Hostau (Hostouň) (Czech Republic); Ronsperg (Poběžovice) (Czech Republic)
5	Blatna	Blatná (Czech Republic); Bresnitz (Březnice) (Czech Republic)
6	Böhmischbrod	Böhmischbrod (Český Brod) (Czech Republic); Schwarzkosteletz (Kostelec nad Černými lesy) (Czech Republic)
7	Böhmisch-Leipa	Böhmisch-Leipa (Česká Lípa) (Czech Republic); Haida (Nový Bor) (Czech Republic); Niemes (Mimoň) (Czech Republic)
8	Brandeis an der Elbe	Brandeis an der Elbe (Brandýs nad Labem) (Czech Republic)
9	Braunau	Braunau (Broumov) (Czech Republic); Politz (Police) (Czech Republic); Weckelsdorf (Teplice nad Metují) (Czech Republic)
10	Brüx	Brüx (Most) (Czech Republic); Katharinaberg (Hora Svaté Kateřiny) (Czech Republic); Oberleutensdorf (Litvínov) (Czech Republic)
11	Budweis	Budweis (České Budějovice) (Czech Republic); Frauenberg (Hluboká nad Vltavou) (Czech Republic); Lischau (Lišov) (Czech Republic); Schweinitz (Trhové Sviny) (Czech Republic)
12	Časlau	Časlau (Čáslav) (Czech Republic); Habern (Habry) (Czech Republic)
13	Chotieborsch	Chotěboř (Czech Republic); Přibislau (Přibyslav) (Czech Republic)
14	Chrudim	Chrudim (Czech Republic); Hlinsko (Czech Republic); Nassaberg (Nasavrky) (Czech Republic)
15	Dauba	Dauba (Dubá) (Czech Republic); Wegstädtl (Štětí) (Czech Republic)
16	Deutschbrod	Deutschbrod (Havlíčkův Brod) (Czech Republic); Polná (Czech Republic); Stecken (Štoky) (Czech Republic)
17	Deutsch-Gabel	Deutsch-Gabel (Jablonné v Podještědí) (Czech Republic); Zwickau (Cvikov) (Czech Republic)
18	Dux	Bilin (Bílina) (Czech Republic); Dux (Duchcov) (Czech Republic)
19	Eger	Eger (Cheb) (Czech Republic); Wildstein (Vildštejn) (Czech Republic)
20	Elbogen	Elbogen (Loket) (Czech Republic)
21	Falkenau	Falkenau (Sokolov) (Czech Republic)
22	Friedland	Friedland (Frýdlant) (Czech Republic); Neustadt an der Tafelfichte (Nové Město pod Smrkem) (Czech Republic)
23	Gablonz	Gablonz an der Neiße (Jablonec nad Nisou) (Czech Republic); Tannwald (Tanvald) (Czech Republic)
24	Graslitz	Graslitz (Kraslice) (Czech Republic)
25	Hohenelbe	Arnau (Hostinné) (Czech Republic); Hohenelbe (Vrchlabí) (Czech Republic)
26	Hohenmauth	Hohenmauth (Vysoké Mýto) (Czech Republic); Skutsch (Skuteč) (Czech Republic)
27	Hořowitz	Beraun (Beroun) (Czech Republic); Hořowitz (Hořovice) (Czech Republic)
28	Humpoletz	Humpoletz (Humpolec) (Czech Republic)
29	Jičin	Jičín (Czech Republic); Libáň (Czech Republic); Sobotka (Czech Republic)
30	Jungbunzlau	Jungbunzlau (Mladá Boleslav) (Czech Republic); Neu Benatek (Benátky nad Jizerou) (Czech Republic)
31	Kaaden	Duppau (Doupov) (Czech Republic); Kaaden (Kadaň) (Czech Republic)
32	Kamenitz an der Linde	Kamenitz an der Linde (Kamenice nad Lipou) (Czech Republic); Potschatek (Počátky) (Czech Republic)
33	Kaplitz	Gratzen (Nové Hrady) (Czech Republic); Hohenfurth (Vyšší Brod) (Czech Republic); Kaplitz (Kaplice) (Czech Republic)
34	Karlsbad	Karlsbad (Karlovy Vary) (Czech Republic)
35	Karolinenthal	Karolinenthal (Karlín) (Czech Republic)
36	Kladno	Kladno (Czech Republic); Unhoscht (Unhošť) (Czech Republic)
37	Klattau	Klattau (Klatovy) (Czech Republic); Neuern (Nýrsko) (Czech Republic); Planitz (Plánice) (Czech Republic)
38	Königgrätz	Königgrätz (Hradec Králové) (Czech Republic); Nechanitz (Nechanice) (Czech Republic)
39	Königinhof an der Elbe	Jaroměř (Czech Republic); Königinhof an der Elbe (Dvůr Králové nad Labem) (Czech Republic)
40	Königliche Weinberge	Eule (Jílové u Prahy) (Czech Republic); Königliche Weinberge (Vinohrady) (Czech Republic); Nusle (Czech Republic); Wrschowitz (Vršovice) (Czech Republic)
41	Kolin	Kaurzim (Kouřim) (Czech Republic); Kolín (Czech Republic)
42	Komotau	Görkau (Jirkov) (Czech Republic); Komotau (Chomutov) (Czech Republic); Sebastiansberg (Hora Svatého Šebestiána) (Czech Republic)
43	Kralowitz	Kralowitz (Kralovice) (Czech Republic); Manetin (Manětín) (Czech Republic)
44	Kralup an der Moldau	Kralup an der Moldau (Kralupy nad Vltavou) (Czech Republic); Welwarn (Velvary) (Czech Republic)
45	Krumau	Kalsching (Chvalšiny) (Czech Republic); Krumau (Český Krumlov) (Czech Republic); Oberplan (Horní Planá) (Czech Republic)
46	Kuttenberg	Kohl-Janowitz (Uhlířské Janovice) (Czech Republic); Kuttenberg (Kutná Hora) (Czech Republic)
47	Landskron	Landskron (Lanškroun) (Czech Republic); Wildenschwert (Ústí nad Orlicí) (Czech Republic)
48	Laun	Laun (Louny) (Czech Republic)
49	Ledetsch	Ledetsch (Czech Republic); Unterkralowitz (Dolní Kralovice) (Czech Republic)
50	Leitmeritz	Auscha (Úštěk) (Czech Republic); Leitmeritz (Litoměřice) (Czech Republic); Lobositz (Lovosice) (Czech Republic)
51	Leitomischl	Leitomischl (Litomyšl) (Czech Republic)
52	Luditz	Buchau (Bochov) (Czech Republic); Luditz (Žlutice) (Czech Republic)
53	Marienbad	Bad Königswart (Lázně Kynžvart) (Czech Republic); Marienbad (Mariánské Lázně) (Czech Republic)
54	Melnik	Mělník (Czech Republic)
55	Mies	Dobřan (Dobřany) (Czech Republic); Mies (Stříbro) (Czech Republic); Staab (Stod) (Czech Republic); Tuschkau (Město Touškov) (Czech Republic)
56	Moldauthein	Moldauthein (Týn nad Vltavou) (Czech Republic)
57	Mühlhausen	Bechin (Bechyně) (Czech Republic); Mühlhausen (Milevsko) (Czech Republic)
58	Münchengrätz	Münchengrätz (Mnichovo Hradiště) (Czech Republic); Weißwasser (Bělá pod Bezdězem) (Czech Republic)
59	Nachod	Böhmisch Skalitz (Česká Skalice) (Czech Republic); Náchod (Czech Republic)
60	Neubidschow	Chlumetz (Chlumec nad Cidlinou) (Czech Republic); Neubidschow (Nový Bydžov) (Czech Republic)
61	Neudek	Neudek (Nejdek) (Czech Republic); Platten (Horní Blatná) (Czech Republic)
62	Neuhaus	Neubistritz (Nová Bystřice) (Czech Republic); Neuhaus (Jindřichův Hradec) (Czech Republic)
63	Neupaka	Hořitz (Hořice) (Czech Republic); Neupaka (Nová Paka) (Czech Republic)
64	Neustadt an der Mettau	Neustadt an der Mettau (Nové Město nad Metují) (Czech Republic); Opočno (Czech Republic)
65	Pardubitz	Holitz (Holice) (Czech Republic); Pardubitz (Pardubice) (Czech Republic); Přelautsch (Přelouč) (Czech Republic)
66	Pilgram	Patzan (Pacov) (Czech Republic); Pilgram (Pelhřimov) (Czech Republic)
67	Pilsen	Blowitz (Blovice) (Czech Republic); Pilsen (Plzeň) (Czech Republic)
68	Pisek	Mirovitz (Mirovice) (Czech Republic); Pisek (Písek) (Czech Republic); Wodnian (Vodňany) (Czech Republic)
69	Plan	Plan (Planá) (Czech Republic); Weseritz (Bezdružice) (Czech Republic)
70	Podiebrad	Königstädtl (Městec Králové) (Czech Republic); Nimburg (Nymburk) (Czech Republic); Podiebrad (Poděbrady) (Czech Republic)
71	Podersam	Jechnitz (Jesenice) (Czech Republic); Podersam (Podbořany) (Czech Republic)
72	Polička	Polička (Czech Republic)
73	Prachatitz	Netolitz (Netolice) (Czech Republic); Prachatitz (Prachatice) (Czech Republic); Wallern (Volary) (Czech Republic); Winterberg (Vimperk) (Czech Republic)
74	Preßnitz	Preßnitz (Přísečnice) (Czech Republic); Weipert (Vejprty) (Czech Republic)
75	Prestitz	Nepomuk (Czech Republic); Prestitz (Přeštice) (Czech Republic)
76	Pribram	Dobříš (Czech Republic); Příbram (Czech Republic)
77	Rakonitz	Pürglitz (Křivoklát) (Czech Republic); Rakonitz (Rakovník) (Czech Republic)
78	Raudnitz	Libochowitz (Libochovice) (Czech Republic); Raudnitz (Roudnice nad Labem) (Czech Republic)
79	Reichenau an der Kněžna	Adlerkosteletz (Kostelec nad Orlicí) (Czech Republic); Reichenau an der Kněžna (Rychnov nad Kněžnou) (Czech Republic)
80	Reichenberg (Landbezirk)	Kratzau (Chrastava) (Czech Republic); Reichenberg (Liberec) (Czech Republic)
81	Rokitzan	Rokycany (Czech Republic); Sbiroh (Zbiroh) (Czech Republic)
82	Rumburg	Rumburg (Rumburk) (Czech Republic)
83	Saaz	Postelberg (Postoloprty) (Czech Republic); Saaz (Žatec) (Czech Republic)
84	Sankt Joachimsthal	Sankt Joachimsthal (Jáchymov) (Czech Republic)
85	Schlan	Neustrašitz (Nové Strašecí) (Czech Republic); Schlan (Slaný) (Czech Republic)
86	Schluckenau	Hainspach (Lipová u Šluknova) (Czech Republic); Schluckenau (Šluknov) (Czech Republic)
87	Schüttenhofen	Bergreichenstein (Kašperské Hory) (Czech Republic); Hartmanitz (Hartmanice) (Czech Republic); Schüttenhofen (Sušice) (Czech Republic)
88	Seltschan	Sedletz (Sedlec) (Czech Republic); Seltschan (Sedlčany) (Czech Republic); Wotitz (Votice) (Czech Republic)
89	Semil	Eisenbrod (Železný Brod) (Czech Republic); Lomnitz an der Popelka (Lomnice nad Popelkou) (Czech Republic); Semil (Semily) (Czech Republic)
90	Senftenberg	Grulich (Králíky) (Czech Republic); Rokitnitz (Rokytnice v Orlických horách) (Czech Republic); Senftenberg (Žamberk) (Czech Republic)
91	Smíchov	Königsaal (Zbraslav) (Czech Republic); Smíchov (Czech Republic)
92	Starkenbach	Hochstadt an der Iser (Vysoké nad Jizerou) (Czech Republic); Rochlitz an der Iser (Rokytnice nad Jizerou) (Czech Republic); Starkenbach (Jilemnice) (Czech Republic)
93	Strakonitz	Horažďowitz (Horažďovice) (Czech Republic); Strakonitz (Strakonice) (Czech Republic); Wolin (Volyně) (Czech Republic)
94	Tabor	Jungwoschitz (Mladá Vožice) (Czech Republic); Sobieslau (Soběslav) (Czech Republic); Tábor (Czech Republic)
95	Tachau	Pfraumberg (Přimda) (Czech Republic); Tachau (Tachov) (Czech Republic)
96	Taus	Neugedein (Kdyně) (Czech Republic); Taus (Domažlice) (Czech Republic)
97	Tepl	Petschau (Bečov nad Teplou) (Czech Republic); Tepl (Teplá) (Czech Republic)
98	Teplitz-Schönau	Teplitz-Schönau (Teplice) (Czech Republic)
99	Tetschen	Bensen (Bensen) (Czech Republic); Böhmisch Kamnitz (Česká Kamenice) (Czech Republic); Tetschen (Děčín) (Czech Republic)
100	Trautenau	Eipel (Úpice) (Czech Republic); Marschendorf (Horní Maršov) (Czech Republic); Schatzlar (Žacléř) (Czech Republic); Trautenau (Trutnov) (Czech Republic)
101	Turnau	Böhmisch Aicha (Český Dub) (Czech Republic); Turnau (Turnov) (Czech Republic)
102	Warnsdorf	Varnsdorf (Czech Republic)
103	Wittingau	Lomnitz an der Lainsitz (Lomnice nad Lužnicí) (Czech Republic); Wesseli an der Lainsitz (Veselí nad Lužnicí) (Czech Republic); Wittingau (Třeboň) (Czech Republic)
104	Žižkov	Ritschan (Říčany) (Czech Republic); Žižkov (Czech Republic)

=== Moravia ===
36 districts and 6 statutory cities (Städte mit eigenem Statut), namely Brünn, Iglau, Kremsier, Olmütz, Ungarisch Hradisch and Znaim.

№	District (Politischer Bezirk)	Towns with district courts (Gerichtsbezirke) (the flag of the country to which the town currently belongs is shown next to it)
1	Auspitz	Auspitz (Hustopeče) (Czech Republic); Klobouk (Klobouky u Brna) (Czech Republic); Seelowitz (Židlochovice) (Czech Republic)
2	Bärn	Hof (Dvorce u Bruntálu) (Czech Republic); Stadt Liebau (Město Libavá) (Czech Republic)
3	Boskowitz	Boskowitz (Boskovice) (Czech Republic); Blansko (Czech Republic); Kunstadt (Kunštát) (Czech Republic)
4	Brünn (Landbezirk)	Brünn-Umgebung (Brno) (Czech Republic); Eibenschitz (Ivančice) (Czech Republic)
5	Datschitz	Datschitz (Dačice) (Czech Republic); Telč (Czech Republic); Zlabings (Slavonice) (Czech Republic)
6	Gaya	Gaya (Kyjov) (Czech Republic); Steinitz (Ždánice) (Czech Republic)
7	Göding	Göding (Hodonín) (Czech Republic); Lundenburg (Břeclav) (Czech Republic); Strassnitz (Strážnice) (Czech Republic)
8	Groß Meseritsch	Groß Bittesch (Velká Bíteš) (Czech Republic); Groß Meseritsch (Velké Meziříčí) (Czech Republic)
9	Hohenstadt	Hohenstadt (Zábřeh) (Czech Republic); Müglitz (Mohelnice) (Czech Republic); Schildberg (Štíty) (Czech Republic)
10	Holleischau	Bistritz am Hostein (Bystřice pod Hostýnem) (Czech Republic); Holleschau (Holešov) (Czech Republic); Wisowitz (Vizovice) (Czech Republic)
11	Iglau (Landbezirk)	Iglau (Jihlava) (Czech Republic); Triesch (Třešť) (Czech Republic)
12	Kremsier (Landbezirk)	Kremsier (Kroměříž) (Czech Republic); Zdounek (Zdounky) (Czech Republic)
13	Littau	Konitz (Konice) (Czech Republic); Littau (Litovel) (Czech Republic)
14	Mährisch Budwitz	Jamnitz (Jemnice) (Czech Republic); Mährisch Budwitz (Moravské Budějovice) (Czech Republic)
15	Mährisch Kromau	Grottowitz (Hrotovice) (Czech Republic); Mährisch Kromau (Moravský Krumlov) (Czech Republic)
16	Mährisch Ostrau	Mährisch Ostrau (Moravská Ostrava) (Czech Republic)
17	Mährisch Schönberg	Mährisch Altstadt (Staré Město pod Sněžníkem) (Czech Republic); Mährisch Schönberg (Šumperk) (Czech Republic); Wiesenberg (Loučná nad Desnou) (Czech Republic)
18	Mährisch Trübau	Gewitsch (Jevíčko) (Czech Republic); Mährisch Trübau (Moravská Třebová) (Czech Republic); Zwittau (Svitavy) (Czech Republic)
19	Mährisch Weißkirchen	Leipnik (Lipník nad Bečvou) (Czech Republic); Mährisch Weißkirchen (Hranice) (Czech Republic)
20	Mistek	Frankstadt (Frenštát pod Radhoštěm) (Czech Republic); Mistek (now part of Frýdek-Místek) (Czech Republic)
21	Neustadtl in Mähren	Bistritz (Bystřice nad Pernštejnem) (Czech Republic); Neustadtl in Mähren (Nové Město na Moravě) (Czech Republic); Saar (Žďár nad Sázavou) (Czech Republic)
22	Neutitschein	Freiberg (Příbor) (Czech Republic); Fulnek (Fulnek) (Czech Republic); Neutitschein (Nový Jičín) (Czech Republic)
23	Nikolsburg	Nikolsburg (Mikulov) (Czech Republic); Pohrlitz (Pohořelice) (Czech Republic)
24	Olmütz (Landbezirk)	Olmütz (Olomouc) (Czech Republic)
25	Prerau	Kojetein (Kojetín) (Czech Republic); Prerau (Přerov) (Czech Republic)
26	Proßnitz	Plumenau (Plumlov) (Czech Republic); Proßnitz (Prostějov) (Czech Republic)
27	Römerstadt	Römerstadt (Rýmařov) (Czech Republic)
28	Sternberg	Mährisch Neustadt (Uničov) (Czech Republic); Sternberg (Šternberk) (Czech Republic)
29	Tischnowitz	Tischnowitz (Tišnov) (Czech Republic)
30	Trebitsch	Namiest an der Oslawa (Náměšť nad Oslavou) (Czech Republic); Trebitsch (Třebíč) (Czech Republic)
31	Ungarisch Brod	Bojkowitz (Bojkovice) (Czech Republic); Ungarisch Brod (Uherský Brod) (Czech Republic); Wallachisch Klobouk (Valašské Klobouky) (Czech Republic)
32	Ungarisch Hradisch (Landbezirk)	Napajedl (Napajedla) (Czech Republic); Ungarisch Hradisch (Uherské Hradiště) (Czech Republic); Ungarisch Ostra (Uherský Ostroh) (Czech Republic)
33	Wallachisch Meseritsch	Rosnau am Radhost (Rožnov pod Radhoštěm) (Czech Republic); Wallachisch Meseritsch (Valašské Meziříčí) (Czech Republic)
34	Wischau	Austerlitz (Slavkov u Brna) (Czech Republic); Butschowitz (Bučovice) (Czech Republic); Wischau (Vyškov) (Czech Republic)
35	Wsetin	Wsetin (Vsetín) (Czech Republic)
36	Znaim (Landbezirk)	Frain (Vranov nad Dyjí) (Czech Republic); Joslowitz (Jaroslavice) (Czech Republic); Znaim (Znojmo) (Czech Republic)

=== Silesia ===
The Crown Land of Silesia was divided into 9 districts and 3 statutory cities (Städte mit eigenem Statut): Troppau (now Opava, Czech Republic), Bielitz (now part of Bielsko-Biała), and Friedek (now part of the city of Frýdek-Místek), subordinate to the crown land government (Landesregierung) in Troppau.

№	District (Politischer Bezirk)	Towns with district courts (Gerichtsbezirke) (the flag of the country to which the town currently belongs is indicated next to it)
1	Bielitz (Landbezirk)	Bielitz (now part of Bielsko-Biała) (Poland); Schwarzwasser (Strumień) (Poland); Skotschau (Skoczów) (Poland)
2	Freistadt	Freistadt (Fryštát, now part of the city of Karviná) (Czech Republic); Oderberg (Bohumín) (Czech Republic)
3	Freiwaldau	Freiwaldau (Jeseník) (Czech Republic); Jauernig (Javorník) (Czech Republic); Weidenau (Vidnava) (Czech Republic); Zuckmantel (Zlaté Hory) (Czech Republic)
4	Freudenthal	Bennisch (Horní Benešov) (Czech Republic); Freudenthal (Bruntál) (Czech Republic); Würbenthal (Vrbno pod Pradědem) (Czech Republic)
5	Friedek (Landbezirk)	Friedek (Frýdek-Místek) (Czech Republic); Polnisch Ostrau (now part of the city of Ostrava) (Czech Republic)
6	Jägerndorf	Hennersdorf (Jindřichov) (Czech Republic); Hotzenplotz (Osoblaha) (Czech Republic); Jägerndorf (Krnov) (Czech Republic); Olbersdorf (Město Albrechtice) (Czech Republic)
7	Teschen	Jablunkau (Jablunkov) (Czech Republic); Teschen (now divided between the Czech Republic and Poland: Český Těšín, Czech Republic and Cieszyn, Poland) /
8	Troppau (Landbezirk)	Odrau (Odry) (Czech Republic); Troppau (Opava) (Czech Republic); Wigstadtl (Vítkov) (Czech Republic)
9	Wagstadt	Königsberg (Klimkovice) (Czech Republic); Wagstadt (Bílovec) (Czech Republic)

=== Galicia and Lodomeria ===
The crown land of Galicia and Lodomeria was subdivided into 82 districts and two statutory cities (Städte mit eigenem Statut), namely Lemberg (Lviv, Ukraine) and Krakau (Kraków, Poland), subordinated to the governorate (de: Statthalterei) in Lemberg.

№	District (Politischer Bezirk)	Towns with district courts (Gerichtsbezirke) (the flag of the country to which the town currently belongs is indicated next to it)
1	Biała	Biała (now part of Bielsko-Biała) (Poland); Kęty (Poland)
2	Bóbrka	Bibrka (Ukraine); Khodoriv (Ukraine)
3	Bochnia	Bochnia (Poland); Niepołomice (Poland); Nowy Wiśnicz (Poland)
4	Bohorodczany	Bohorodchany (Ukraine); Solotvyn (Ukraine)
5	Borszczów	Borshchiv (Ukraine); Melnytsia-Podilska (Ukraine)
6	Brody	Brody (Ukraine); Pidkamin (Ukraine)
7	Brzesko	Brzesko (Poland); Radłów (Poland); Wojnicz (Poland); Zakliczyn (Poland)
8	Brzeżany	Berezhany (Ukraine); Kozova (Ukraine)
9	Brzozów	Brzozów (Poland); Dynów (Poland)
10	Buczacz	Buchach (Ukraine); Monastyryska (Ukraine); Zolotyi Potik (Ukraine)
11	Chrzanów	Chrzanów (Poland); Jaworzno (Poland); Krzeszowice (Poland)
12	Cieszanów	Cieszanów (Poland); Lubaczów (Poland)
13	Czortków	Chortkiv (Ukraine)
14	Dąbrowa	Dąbrowa Tarnowska (Poland); Żabno (Poland)
15	Dobromil	Bircza (Poland); Dobromyl (Ukraine)
16	Dolina	Bolekhiv (Ukraine); Dolyna (Ukraine); Rozhniativ (Ukraine)
17	Drohobycz	Drohobych (Ukraine); Medenychi (Ukraine); Pidbuzh (Ukraine)
18	Gorlice	Biecz (Poland); Gorlice (Poland)
19	Gródek Jagielloński	Gródek (Horodok) (Ukraine); Janów (Ivano-Frankove) (Ukraine)
20	Grybów	Ciężkowice (Poland); Grybów (Poland)
21	Horodenka	Horodenka (Ukraine); Obertyn (Ukraine)
22	Husiatyn	Husiatyn (Ukraine); Kopychyntsi (Ukraine)
23	Jarosław	Jarosław (Poland); Pruchnik (Poland); Radymno (Poland); Sieniawa (Poland)
24	Jasło	Jasło (Poland); Nowy Żmigród (Poland)
25	Jaworów	Yavoriv (Ukraine); Krakovets (Ukraine)
26	Kałusz	Kalush (Ukraine); Krasna (Ukraine); Voynyliv (Ukraine)
27	Kamionka Strumiłowa	Busk (Ukraine); Kamionka Strumiłowa (Kamianka-Buzka) (Ukraine)
28	Kolbuszowa	Kolbuszowa (Poland); Sokołów (Poland)
29	Kołomyja	Hvizdets (Ukraine); Kolomyia (Ukraine)
30	Kosów	Kosów (Kosiv) (Ukraine); Kuty (Ukraine); Verkhovyna (Ukraine)
31	Krakau (Landbezirk)	Krakau (Kraków) (Poland); Liszki (Poland)
32	Krosno	Dukla (Poland); Krosno (Poland)
33	Łańcut	Łańcut (Poland); Leżajsk (Poland)
34	Lemberg (Landbezirk)	Lemberg-Umgebung (Ukraine); Shchyrets (Ukraine); Vynnyky (Ukraine)
35	Limanowa	Limanowa (Poland); Mszana Dolna (Poland)
36	Lisko	Baligród (Poland); Lesko (Poland); Lutowiska (Poland); Ustrzyki Dolne (Poland)
37	Mielec	Mielec (Poland); Radomyśl Wielki (Poland)
38	Mościska	Mostyska (Ukraine); Sądowa Wisznia (Sudova Vyshnia) (Ukraine)
39	Myślenice	Jordanów (Poland); Maków (Poland); Myślenice (Poland)
40	Nadwórna	Deliatyn (Ukraine); Nadwórna (Nadvirna) (Ukraine)
41	Nisko	Nisko (Poland); Rudnik (Poland); Ulanów (Poland)
42	Nowy Sącz	Muszyna (Poland); Nowy Sącz (Poland); Stary Sącz (Poland)
43	Nowy Targ	Czarny Dunajec (Poland); Krościenko nad Dunajcem (Poland); Nowy Targ (Poland)
44	Oświęcim	Oświęcim (Poland); Zator (Poland)
45	Pechenizhyn	Yabluniv (Ukraine); Pechenizhyn (Ukraine)
46	Pilzno	Brzostek (Poland); Pilzno (Poland)
47	Podgórze	Podgórze (Poland); Skawina (Poland)
48	Podhajce	Pidhaitsi (Ukraine); Vyshnivchyk (Ukraine)
49	Przemyśl	Dubiecko (Poland); Nyzhankovychi (Ukraine); Przemyśl (Poland)
50	Przemyślany	Hlyniany (Ukraine); Przemyślany (Peremyshliany) (Ukraine)
51	Przeworsk	Przeworsk (Poland)
52	Radziechów	Radekhiv (Ukraine); Lopatyn (Ukraine)
53	Rawa Ruska	Rava-Ruska (Ukraine); Nemyriv (Ukraine); Uhnow (Uhniv) (Ukraine)
54	Rohatyn	Bilshivtsi (Ukraine); Rohatyn (Ukraine); Burshtyn (Ukraine)
55	Ropczyce	Dębica (Poland); Ropczyce (Poland)
56	Rudki	Komarno (Ukraine); Rudky (Ukraine)
57	Rzeszów	Głogów (Poland); Rzeszów (Poland); Tyczyn (Poland)
58	Sambor	Luka (Ukraine); Sambir (Ukraine)
59	Sanok	Bukowsko (Poland); Rymanów (Poland); Sanok (Poland)
60	Skałat	Hrymailiv (Ukraine); Pidvolochysk (Ukraine); Skalat (Ukraine)
61	Skole	Skole (Ukraine)
62	Śniatyn	Sniatyn (Ukraine); Zabolotiv (Ukraine)
63	Sokal	Bełz (Belz) (Ukraine); Sokal (Sokal) (Ukraine)
64	Stanisławów	Halych (Ukraine); Stanisławów (Ivano-Frankivsk) (Ukraine)
65	Stare Miasto	Stara Sil (Ukraine); Stary Sambir (Ukraine)
66	Stryj	Stryi (Ukraine)
67	Strzyżów	Frysztak (Poland); Strzyżów (Poland)
68	Tarnobrzeg	Rozwadów (Poland) , suburb of Stalowa Wola (Poland); Tarnobrzeg (Poland)
69	Tarnopol	Mykulyntsi (Ukraine); Tarnopol (Ternopil) (Ukraine)
70	Tarnów	Tarnów (Poland); Tuchów (Poland)
71	Tłumacz	Tlumach (Ukraine); Tysmenytsia (Ukraine); Otyniia (Ukraine)
72	Trembowla	Budaniv (Ukraine); Terebovlia (Ukraine)
73	Turka	Borynia (Ukraine); Turka (Ukraine)
74	Wadowice	Andrychów (Poland); Kalwaria Zebrzydowska (Poland); Wadowice (Poland)
75	Wieliczka	Dobczyce (Poland); Wieliczka (Poland)
76	Zaleszczyki	Zalishchyky (Ukraine); Tovste (Ukraine)
77	Zbaraż	Nove Selo (Ukraine); Zbarazh (Ukraine)
78	Zborów	Zaliztsi (Ukraine); Zborów (Zboriv) (Ukraine)
79	Złoczów	Olesko (Ukraine); Złoczów (Zolochiv) (Ukraine)
80	Żółkiew	Kulykiv (Ukraine); Wielkie Mosty (Velyki Mosty) (Ukraine); Żółkiew (Zhovkva) (Ukraine)
81	Żydaczów	Mykolaiv (Ukraine); Zhydachiv (Ukraine); Zhuravno (Ukraine)
82	Żywiec	Milówka (Poland); Sucha Beskidzka (Poland); Żywiec (Poland)

=== Bukovina ===
The crown land of Bukovina was subdivided into 11 districts and one statutory city (Stadt mit eigenem Statut), namely Czernowitz (Chernivtsi), subordinated to the government of the crown land in Czernowitz.

№	District (Politischer Bezirk)	Towns with district courts (Gerichtsbezirke) (the flag of the country to which the town currently belongs is indicated next to it)
1	Czernowitz	Boyany (Ukraine); Czernowitz (Chernivtsi) (Ukraine); Sadagura (Sadhora) (Ukraine)
2	Gurahumora	Gurahumora (Gura Humorului) (Romania); Solca (Romania)
3	Kimpolung	Dorna-Watra (Vatra Dornei) (Romania); Kimpolung (Câmpulung Moldovenesc) (Romania); Stulpicani (Romania)
4	Kotzman	Kotzmann (Kitsman) (Ukraine)
5	Radautz	Oberwikow (Vicovu de Sus) (Romania); Radautz (Rădăuți) (Romania); Seletin (Seliatyn) (Ukraine)
6	Sereth	Siret (Romania)
7	Storozynetz	Chudei (Ukraine); Storozhynets (Ukraine)
8	Suczawa	Suceava (Romania)
9	Waszkoutz am Cheremosch	Stanestie (Stanivtsi) (Ukraine); Waszkoutz am Cheremosch (Vashkivtsi) (Ukraine)
10	Wiznitz	Putyla (Ukraine); Wiznitz (Vyzhnytsia) (Ukraine)
11	Zastawna	Zastavna (Ukraine)

=== Dalmatia ===
14 districts, subordinated to the governorate in Zara (the capital of the crown land).

№	District	Towns / settlements
1	Benkovac	Benkovac (Croatia); Kistanje (Kistanje) (Croatia); Obbrovazzo (Obrovac) (Croatia)
2	Cattaro	Budua (Budva) (Montenegro) (the southernmost town of the Empire); Castelnuovo (Herceg Novi) (Montenegro); Cattaro (Kotor) (Montenegro); Perasto (Perast) (Montenegro)
3	Curzola	Blatta (Blato) (Croatia); Curzola (Korčula) (Croatia); Sabioncello (Orebić) (Croatia)
4	Imoschi	Imotski (Croatia)
5	Knin	Dernis (Drniš) (Croatia); Knin (Croatia)
6	Lesina	Cittavecchia (Stari Grad) (Croatia); Lesina (Hvar) (Croatia); Lissa (Vis) (Croatia)
7	Macarsca	Makarska (Croatia); Vrgorac (Croatia)
8	Metković	Metković (Croatia)
9	Ragusa	Ragusa (Dubrovnik) (Croatia); Ragusa Vecchia (Cavtat) (Croatia); Stagno (Ston) (Croatia)
10	San Pietro	San Pietro (Supetar) (Croatia)
11	Sebenico	Scardona (Skradin) (Croatia); Sebenico (Šibenik) (Croatia); Stretto (Tisno) (Croatia)
12	Sign	Sinj (Croatia); Verlicca (Vrlika) (Croatia)
13	Spalato	Almissa (Omiš) (Croatia); Spalato (Split) (Croatia); Traù (Trogir) (Croatia)
14	Zara	Arbe (Rab) (Croatia); Pago (Pag) (Croatia); Zara (Zadar) (Croatia); Zaravecchia (Biograd na Moru) (Croatia)

== Transleithania (Lands of the Hungarian Crown) ==
Administrative division of Transleithania (Lands of the Hungarian Crown) at the beginning of the 20th century

Transleithania (the Lands of the Hungarian Crown) had its own system of administrative-territorial division. It was divided into 71 counties:

- 48 counties of the Kingdom of Hungary;
- 15 counties of Transylvania;
- 8 counties of the Kingdom of Croatia and Slavonia.

The county system covered the entire territory of Transleithania. The counties were further subdivided into districts (Hungarian: járások). The capital of the Kingdom of Hungary was Budapest. The county division is shown as of the beginning of the 20th century.

=== Counties of Hungary ===
County	Capital	Districts into which the county was divided and their centres
1. Pozsony	Pozsony (now Bratislava) (Slovakia)	1. Dunaszerdahely (Dunajská Streda) (Slovakia); 2. Galánta (Galanta) (Slovakia); 3. Malacka (Malacky) (Slovakia); 4. Nagyszombat (Trnava) (Slovakia); 5. Pozsony (Bratislava) (Slovakia); 6. Somorja (Šamorín) (Slovakia); 7. Szenć (Senec) (Slovakia); City with special status (Stadtkreis): Pozsony (Bratislava) (Slovakia) Urban councils: 1. Bazin (Pezinok) (Slovakia); 2. Modor (Modra) (Slovakia); 3. Nagyszombat (Trnava) (Slovakia); 4. Szentgyörgy (Svätý Jur) (Slovakia)
2. Nitra	Nitra (Slovakia)	1. Nitra (Slovakia); 2. Vágsellye (Šaľa) (Slovakia) (also, the centre of the district was the neighbouring town Tornóc (Trnovec nad Váhom)) (Slovakia); 3. Vágújhely (Nové Mesto nad Váhom) (Slovakia); 4. Galgóc (Hlohovec) (Slovakia); 5. Nagytapolcsány (Topoľčany) (Slovakia); 6. Privigye (Prievidza) (Slovakia); 7. Érsekújvár (Nové Zámky) (Slovakia); 8. Miava (Myjava) (Slovakia); 9. Szenic (Senica) (Slovakia) (also, the centre of the district was Holic (Holíč)) (Slovakia); 10. Szakolca (Skalica) (Slovakia); 11. Pöstyén (Piešťany) (Slovakia); 12. Nyitrazsámbokrév (Žabokreky nad Nitrou) (Slovakia)
3. Trencsén	Trencsén (Slovakia)	1. Csaca (Čadca) (Slovakia); 2. Kiszucaújhely (Kysucké Nové Mesto) (Slovakia); 3. Zsolna (Žilina) (Slovakia); 4. Nagybiccse (Bytča) (Slovakia); 5. Vágbeszterce (Považská Bystrica) (Slovakia); 6. Puhó (Púchov) (Slovakia); 7. Illava (Ilava) (Slovakia); 8. Trencsén (Trenčín) (Slovakia); 9. Bán (Bánovce nad Bebravou) (Slovakia)
4. Turóc	Turócszentmárton (Martin) (Slovakia)	1. Turócszentmárton (Martin) (Slovakia) , also a major village is Blatnica (Slovakia) , which was previously reflected in the name of the district 2. Stubnyafürdő (Turčianske Teplice) (Slovakia) , the district was formerly called Mosóc (Mošovce) (Slovakia) and Zniováralja (Kláštor pod Znievom) (Slovakia)
5. Árva	Árvaszúbó (Dolný Kubín) (Slovakia)	1. Árvaszúbó (Dolný Kubín) (Slovakia); 2. Námesztó (Námestovo) (Slovakia); 3. Trsztena (Trstená) (Slovakia); 4. Var (Tvrdošín) (Slovakia)
6. Liptó	Liptószentmiklós (Liptovský Mikuláš) (Slovakia)	1. Liptószentmiklós (Liptovský Mikuláš) (Slovakia); 2. Liptóújvár (Liptovský Hrádok) (Slovakia); 3. Németlipcse (Partizánska Ľupča) (Slovakia); 4. Rózsahegy (Ružomberok) (Slovakia)
7. Zólyom	Besztercebánya (Banská Bystrica) (Slovakia)	1. Besztercebánya (Banská Bystrica) (Slovakia); 2. Breznóbánya (Brezno) (Slovakia); 3. Zólyom (Zvolen) (Slovakia); 4. Nagyszalatna (Zvolenská Slatina) (Slovakia); Urban districts: 1. Besztercebánya (Banská Bystrica) (Slovakia); 2. Breznóbánya (Brezno) (Slovakia); 3. Zólyom (Zvolen) (Slovakia)
8. Bars	Aranyosmarót (Zlaté Moravce) (Slovakia)	1. Aranyosmarót (Zlaté Moravce) (Slovakia); 2. Verebély (Vráble) (Slovakia); 3. Léva (Levice) (Slovakia); 4. Oszlány (Oslany) (Slovakia); 5. Garamszentkereszt (Žiar nad Hronom) (Slovakia); Urban districts: 1. Léva (Levice) (Slovakia); 2. Körmöcbánya (Kremnica) (Slovakia); 3. Újbánya (Nová Baňa) (Slovakia)
9. Esztergom	Esztergom	1. Esztergom (Hungary); 2. Parkány (Štúrovo) (Slovakia) , the seat of the district was temporarily moved to the settlement of Muzsla; City district: Esztergom
10. Hont	Ipolyság (Šahy) (Slovakia)	1. Bát (Bátovce) (Slovakia); 2. Ipolynék (Vinica) (Slovakia); 3. Ipolyság (Šahy) (Slovakia); 4. Korpona (Krupina) (Slovakia); 5. Szob (Hungary); 6. Vámosmikola (Hungary); Urban districts: Banská Štiavnica (Slovakia) , Banská Belá (Slovakia)
11. Nógrád	Balassagyarmat	1. Balassagyarmat (Hungary); 2. Nógrád (the district seat was Romhány) (Hungary); 3. Szirák (Hungary); 4. Szécsény (Hungary); 5. Fülek (Fiľakovo) (Slovakia) , the district seat was also Salgótarján (Hungary); 6. Losonc (Lučenec) (Slovakia); 7. Gács (Halič) (Slovakia); City district: Losonc (Lučenec) (Slovakia)
12. Heves	Eger	1. Eger (Hungary); 2. Gyöngyös (Hungary); 3. Tiszafüred (Hungary); 4. Hatvan (Hungary); 5. Heves (Hungary); 6. Pétervására (Hungary)
13. Borsod	Miskolc	1. Miskolc (Hungary); 2. Mezőcsát (Hungary); 3. Mezőkövesd (Hungary); 4. Sajószentpéter (Hungary); 5. Ózd (Hungary); 6. Edelény (the district seat was also Szendrő); City district: Miskolc (Hungary)
14. Gömör-Kishont	Rimaszombat (Rimavská Sobota) (Slovakia)	1. Tornaľa (Slovakia); 2. Rozsnyó (Rožňava) (Slovakia); 3. Nagyrőce (the district seat was Jelšava) (Slovakia); 4. Rimaszombat (the district seat was Gňužtá) (Slovakia); 5. Rimaszécs (Rimavská Seč) (district seat Jesenské) (Slovakia); 6. Gömörvölgy (district seat was Királyhegyalja, civil court was in Nándorvölgy, established in 1900) (Hungary); 7. Ratko (district established in 1909) (Hungary); 8. Putnok (district established in 1910) (Hungary); Urban districts: Dobšiná (Slovakia) , Jolsva (Jelšava) (Slovakia) , Nagyrőce (Revúca) (Slovakia) , Rozsnyó (Rožňava) (Slovakia) , Rimaszombat (Rimavská Sobota) (Slovakia)
15. Abaúj-Torna	Kassa (Košice) (Slovakia)	1. Kassa (Košice) (Slovakia); 2. Füzér (the district seat was Hernádzsadány, now Ždaňa) (Slovakia); 3. Cserehát (the district seat was Moldava nad Bodvou) (Slovakia); 4. Torna (Turna nad Bodvou); 5. Szikszó (Hungary); 6. Gönc (seat Abaújszántó) (Hungary); City district: Kassa (Košice) (Slovakia)
16. Sáros	Eperjes (Prešov) (Slovakia)	1. Eperjes (Prešov) (Slovakia); 2. Bártfa (Bardejov) (Slovakia); 3. Felsővízköz (Svidník) (Slovakia); 4. Girált (Giraltovce) (Slovakia); 5. Héthárs (Lipany) (Slovakia); 6. Kisszeben (Sabinov) (Slovakia); 7. Lemes (Lemešany) (Slovakia); Urban districts: Eperjes (Prešov) (Slovakia) , Bártfa (Bardejov) (Slovakia) , Kisszeben (Sabinov) (Slovakia)
17. Szepes	Lőcse (Levoča) (Slovakia)	1. Lőcse (Levoča) (Slovakia); 2. Gölnicbánya (Gelnica) (Slovakia); 3. Igló (Spišská Nová Ves) (Slovakia); 4. Késmárk (Kežmarok) (Slovakia); 5. Ólubló (Stará Ľubovňa) (Slovakia); 6. Szepesófalu (Spišská Stará Ves) (Slovakia); 7. Szepesszombat (Spišská Sobota) (Slovakia); 8. Szepesváralja (Spišské Podhradie) (Slovakia); Urban districts: 1. Gölnicbánya (Gelnica) (Slovakia); 2. Igló (Spišská Nová Ves) (Slovakia); 3. Késmárk (Kežmarok) (Slovakia); 4. Leibic (Ľubica) (Slovakia); 5. Poprad (Slovakia); 6. Szepesbéla (Spišská Belá) (Slovakia); 7. Szepesolaszi (Spišské Vlachy) (Slovakia); 8. Szepesváralja (Spišské Podhradie) (Slovakia)
18. Zemplén	Sátoraljaújhely (Hungary)	1. Bodrogköz (Királyhelmec, now Kráľovský Chlmec) (Slovakia); 2. Galszecs (Sečovce) (Slovakia); 3. Homonnai (Humenné) (Slovakia); 4. Mezőlaborc (Medzilaborce) (Slovakia); 5. Nagymihály (Michalovce) (Slovakia); 6. Sárospatak (Hungary); 7. Sátoraljaújhely (Hungary); 8. Szerencs (Hungary); 9. Szinna (Snina) (Slovakia); 10. Stropkó (Stropkov) (Slovakia); 11. Tokaj (Hungary); 12. Varanno (Vranov nad Topľou) (Slovakia); City district: Sátoraljaújhely (Hungary)
19. Ung	Ungvár (Uzhhorod) (Ukraine)	1. Ungvár (Uzhhorod) (Ukraine); 2. Nagykapos (Veľké Kapušany) (Slovakia); 3. Szobránc (Sobrance) (Slovakia); 4. Nagyberezna (Velykyi Bereznyi) (Ukraine); 5. Perecseny (Perechyn) (Ukraine); 6. Szередnye (Serednie) (Ukraine); City district: Ungvár (Uzhhorod) (Ukraine)
20. Bereg	Beregszász (Berehove) (Ukraine)	1. Alsóverecke (Nyizsni Vorota) (Ukraine); 2. Felsővidék (district seat was Ilosva, now Irshava) (Ukraine); 3. Latorca (Latorica) (district seat was Oroszvég, now Rosvihovo, part of Mukachevo) (Ukraine); 4. Mezőkaszony (Koson) (Ukraine); 5. Munkács (Mukachevo) (Ukraine); 6. Szolyva (Svaliava) (Ukraine); 7. Tiszahát (district seat was Beregszász (Berehove) (Ukraine) ); Urban districts: Beregszász (Berehove) (Ukraine) , Munkács (Mukachevo) (Ukraine)
21. Máramaros	Máramarossziget (Sighetu Marmației)	1. Dolha (Dovhe) (Ukraine); 2. Khust (Ukraine); 3. Izavölgy (district seat was Dragomérfalva, now Dragomirești) (Romania); 4. Ökörmező (Mizhhiria) (Ukraine); 5. Sugatag (Ocna Șugatag) (Romania); 6. Sziget (district seat Sighetu Marmației) (Romania); 7. Taracvize (seat Taracköz, now Teresva) (Ukraine); 8. Técső (Tiachiv) (Ukraine); 9. Tiszavölgy (seat Raho, now Rakhiv) (Ukraine); 10. Visó (seat Felsővisó, now Vișeu de Sus) (Romania)
22. Ugocsa	Nagyszőlős (Vynohradiv) (Ukraine)	1. Tiszáninnen (seat Nagyszőlős (Vynohradiv)) (Ukraine); 2. Tiszántúl (seat Halmi (Halmeu)) (Romania)
23. Szatmár	Nagykároly (Carei) (Romania)	1. Nagykároly (Carei) (Romania); 2. Mátészalka (Hungary); 3. Fehérgyarmat (Hungary); 4. Érmindszent (Ardud) (Romania); 5. Szinyérváralja (Seini) (Romania); 6. Nagybánya (Baia Mare) (Romania); 7. Nagysomkút (Șomcuta Mare) (Romania); 8. Csenger (Hungary); 9. Szatmárnémeti (Satu Mare) (Romania); City with legal status: Szatmárnémeti (Satu Mare) (Romania) Urban districts: Nagykároly (Carei) (Romania) , Nagybánya (Baia Mare) (Romania) , Felsőbánya (Baia Sprie) (Romania)
24. Szabolcs	Nyíregyháza (Hungary)	1. Kisvárda (Hungary); 2. Tisza (seat Mándok) (Hungary); 3. Dadá-alsó (seat Tiszalök) (Hungary); 4. Dadá-felső (seat Gáva) (Hungary); 5. Nyírbogdány (seat Kemecse) (Hungary); 6. Nyírbátor (Hungary); 7. Nagykálló (Hungary); 8. Ligetalja (from 1907, seat Nyíradony) (Hungary); City district: Nyíregyháza (Hungary)
25. Bihar	Nagyvárad (Oradea) (Romania)	1. Központ (district seat Nagyvárad, now Oradea) (Romania); 2. Sáránd (Sălard) (Romania); 3. Margitta (Marghita) (Romania); 4. Érmihályfalva (Valea lui Mihai) (Romania); 5. Székelyhíd (Săcueni) (Romania); 6. Derecske (Hungary); 7. Berettyóújfalu (Hungary); 8. Torda (district seat Biharnagybajom) (Hungary); 9. Biharkeresztes (Hungary); 10. Cséffa (Ceica) (Romania); 11. Nagyszalonta (Salonta) (Romania); 12. Tenke (Tinca) (Romania); 13. Belény (Beiuș) (Romania); 14. Magyarcséke (Ceica) (Romania); 15. Vaskoh (Vașcău) (Romania); 16. Élesd (Aleșd) (Romania)
26. Békés	Gyula (Gyula) (Hungary)	1. Gyula (Hungary); 2. Békés (Hungary); 3. Békéscsaba (Hungary); 4. Szarvas (Hungary); 5. Szeghalom (Hungary); 6. Orosháza (Hungary); 7. Gyomaendrőd (Hungary); City district: Gyula (Hungary)
27. Pest-Pilis-Solt-Kiskun	Budapest (Hungary)	1. Abony (Hungary) (until 1898 — Lower Kecskemét district); 2. Alsódabas (Hungary) (until 1898 — Middle Pest district); 3. Biatorbágy (Hungary) (until 1898 — Lower Pilis district) (from 1934 — Budakörnyék district, administrative centre: Budapest); 4. Dunavecse (Hungary) (until 1898 — Upper Solt district); 5. Gödöllő (Hungary) (until 1898 — Lower Vác district); 6. Kalocsa (Hungary) (until 1898 — Middle Solt district); 7. Kiskőrös (Hungary) (until 1898 — Lower Solt district); 8. Kiskunfélegyháza (Hungary) (until 1898 — Lower Kiskun district); 9. Kunszentmiklós (Hungary) (until 1898 — Upper Kiskun district); 10. Monor (Hungary) (until 1898 — Upper Pest district); 11. Nagykáta (Hungary) (until 1898 — Upper Kecskemét district); 12. Pomáz (Hungary) (until 1898 — Upper Pilis district) (from 1940 renamed Szentendre district, centre: Szentendre); 13. Ráckeve (Hungary) (until 1898 — Lower Pest district); 14. Vác (Hungary) (until 1898 — Upper Vác district); 15. Aszód (Hungary) (established in 1912); 16. Gyömrő (Hungary) (established in 1913); 17. Kispest (Hungary) (established in 1911; from 1922 called Central district, administrative centre: Budapest); Cities with municipal rights: 1. Budapest (Hungary); 2. Kecskemét (Hungary); Urban districts: 1. Cegléd (Hungary); 2. Kiskunfélegyháza (Hungary); 3. Kiskunhalas (Hungary); 4. Nagykőrös (Hungary); 5. Szentendre (Hungary); 6. Vác (Hungary)
28. Bács-Bodrog	Zombor (Sombor) (Serbia)	1. Apatin (Serbia); 2. Bácsalmás (Hungary); 3. Baja (Hungary); 4. Hódság (Odžaci) (Serbia); 5. Kula (Serbia); 6. Óbecse (Bečej) (Serbia); 7. Palánka (Bačka Palanka) (Serbia); 8. Titel (Serbia); 9. Topolya (Bačka Topola) (Serbia); 10. Újvidék (Novi Sad) (Serbia); 11. Zenta (Senta) (Serbia); 12. Zombor (Sombor) (Serbia); 13. Zsablya (Žabalj) (Serbia); Cities with municipal rights: 1. Baja (Hungary); 2. Szabadka (Subotica) (Serbia); 3. Újvidék (Novi Sad) (Serbia); 4. Zombor (Sombor) (Serbia); Urban district: Zenta (Senta) (Serbia)
29. Csongrád	Szentes (Hungary)	1. Tiszáninnen (seat Kiskundorozsma, now Szeged) (Hungary); 2. Tiszántúl (Mindszent) (Hungary); 3. Csongrád (Hungary); Cities with municipal rights: 1. Hódmezővásárhely (Hungary); 2. Szeged (Hungary); Urban district: Szentes (Hungary)
30. Csanád	Makó (Hungary)	1. Battonya (Hungary); 2. Központ (seat Makó) (Hungary); 3. Mezőkovácsháza (Hungary); 4. Nagylak (Nădlac) (Romania); Urban district: Makó (Hungary)
31. Arad	Arad (Romania)	1. Arad (Romania); 2. Borosjenő (Ineu) (Romania); 3. Borossebes (Sebiș) (Romania); 4. Elek (Hungary); 5. Kisjenő (Chișineu-Criș) (Romania); 6. Magyarpécska (Pecica) (Romania); 7. Máriaradna (Radna) (Romania); 8. Nagyhalmágy (Hălmagiu) (Romania); 9. Törökvár (Târnova) (Romania); 10. Világos (Șiria) (Romania); Urban district: Arad (Romania)
32. Temes	Temesvár (Timișoara) (Romania)	1. Központ (seat Temesvár (Timișoara)) (Romania); 2. Buziásfürdő (Buziaș) (Romania); 3. Csák (Ciacova) (Romania); 4. Detta (Deta) (Romania); 5. Fehértemplom (Bela Crkva) (Serbia); 6. Kevevára (Kovin) (Romania); 7. Lippa (Lipova) (Romania); 8. Temesrékas (Recaș) (Romania); 9. Újarad (Aradul Nou) (Romania); 10. Versecz (Vršac) (Serbia); 11. Vinga (Romania); Cities with municipal rights: Temesvár (Timișoara) (Romania) , Versecz (Vršac) (Serbia) Urban district: Fehértemplom (Bela Crkva) (Serbia)
33. Torontál	Nagybecskerek (Zrenjanin) (Serbia)	1. Alibunar (Serbia); 2. Antalfalva (Kovačica) (Serbia); 3. Bánlak (Banatski Monoštor); 4. Csene (Čenej) (Serbia); 5. Módos (Jаšа Tomić) (Serbia); 6. Nagybecskerek (Zrenjanin) (Serbia); 7. Nagybecskerek (Kikinda) (Serbia); 8. Nagyszentmiklós (Sânnicolau Mare) (Romania); 9. Pancsova (Pančevo) (Serbia); 10. Párdány (Međa) (Serbia); 11. Perjámos (Periam) (Serbia); 12. Törökbecse (Novi Bečej) (Serbia); 13. Törökkanizsa (Novi Kneževac) (Serbia); 14. Zsombolya (Jimbolia) (Romania); City with municipal rights: Pancsova (Pančevo) (Serbia) Urban districts: Nagybecskerek (Zrenjanin) (Serbia) , Nagykikinda (Kikinda) (Serbia)
34. Krassó-Szörény	Lugos (Lugoj) (Romania)	1. Bega (seat Balinț) (Romania); 2. Boksánbánya (Bocșa) (Romania); 3. Bozovics (Bozovici); 4. Facsád (Făget) (Romania); 5. Jám; 6. Karánsebes (Caransebeș) (Romania); 7. Lugos (Lugoj) (Romania); 8. Maros/Mureș (seat Birchiș) (Romania); 9. Oravicabánya (Oravița) (Romania); 10. Resicabánya (Reșița) (Romania); 11. Temes/Timiș (Sacul, now Sacu) (Romania); 12. Teregova (Romania); 13. Újmoldova (Moldova Nouă) (Romania)
35. Moson	Mosonmagyaróvár (Hungary)	1. Mosonmagyaróvár (Hungary); 2. Rajka (Hungary); 3. Nezsider (Neusiedl am See) (Austria)
36. Győr	Győr (Hungary)	1. Tószigetcsilizköz (seat Győr) (Hungary); 2. Sokoróalja (seat Tét) (Hungary); 3. Puszta (seat Győrszentmárton, now Pannonhalma) (Hungary)
37. Komárom	Komárom (Hungary)	1. Csallóköz (seat Nemesócsá, now Zemianska Olča) (Slovakia); 2. Udvard, now Dvory nad Žitavou (seat Ógyalla, now Hurbanovo) (Slovakia); 3. Várgesztes (seat Nagyigmánd) (Hungary); 4. Tata (Hungary); Urban district: Komárom (Hungary)
38. Fejér	Székesfehérvár (Hungary)	1. Adony (Hungary); 2. Mór (Hungary); 3. Sárbogárd (Hungary); 4. Vál (Hungary); 5. Székesfehérvár (Hungary); Urban district: Székesfehérvár (Hungary)
39. Veszprém	Veszprém (Hungary)	1. Veszprém (Hungary); 2. Devecser (Hungary); 3. Enying (Hungary); 4. Pápa (Hungary); 5. Zirc (Hungary); Urban districts: Pápa (Hungary) , Veszprém (Hungary)
40. Tolna	Szekszárd (Hungary)	1. Központ (seat Szekszárd) (Hungary); 2. Völgység (seat Bonyhád) (Hungary); 3. Dunaföldvár (Paks) (Hungary); 4. Simontornya (Gyönk) (Hungary); 5. Dombóvár (Dombóvár) (Hungary); 6. Tamási (Tamási) (Hungary) (from 1895); Urban district: Szekszárd (Hungary)
41. Baranya	Pécs (Hungary)	1. Baranyavár (seat Darda) (Croatia); 2. Hegyháti (seat Sásd) (Hungary); 3. Mohács (Hungary); 4. Pécs (Hungary); 5. Pécsvárad (Hungary); 6. Siklós (Hungary); 7. Szentlőrinc (Hungary); Urban district: Pécs (Hungary)
42. Somogy	Kaposvár (Hungary)	1. Kaposvár (Hungary); 2. Marcali (Hungary); 3. Nagyatád (Hungary); 4. Igal (Hungary); 5. Szigetvár (Hungary); 6. Lengyeltóti (Hungary); 7. Csurgó (Hungary); 8. Tab (Hungary); 9. Barcs (Hungary) (from 1896); Urban district: Kaposvár
43. Zala	Zalaegerszeg (Hungary)	1. Alsólendva (Lendava) (Slovenia); 2. Balatonfüred (Hungary); 3. Csáktornya (Čakovec) (Croatia); 4. Keszthely (Hungary); 5. Letenye (Hungary); 6. Nagykanizsa (Hungary); 7. Nova (Hungary); 8. Pacsa (Hungary); 9. Perlak (Prelog) (Croatia); 10. Sümeg (Hungary); 11. Tapolca (Hungary); 12. Zalaegerszeg (Hungary); 13. Zalaszentgrót (Hungary); Urban districts: Nagykanizsa (Hungary) , Zalaegerszeg (Hungary)
44. Vas	Szombathely (Hungary)	1. Szombathely (Hungary); 2. Felsőőr (Oberwart) (Austria); 3. Kőszeg (Hungary); 4. Körmend (Hungary); 5. Muraszombat (Murska Sobota) (Slovenia); 6. Németújvár (Güssing) (Austria); 7. Sárvár (Hungary); 8. Szentgotthárd (Hungary); 9. Vasvár (Hungary); 10. Celldömölk (until 1903 the district was called Kiscell) (Hungary)
45. Sopron	Sopron (Hungary)	1. Sopron (Hungary); 2. Nagymarton (Mattersburg) (Austria); 3. Kismarton (Eisenstadt) (Austria); 4. Felsőpulya (Oberpullendorf) (Austria); 5. Csáford (Hungary); 6. Kapuvár (Hungary); 7. Csorna (Hungary); City with municipal rights: Sopron (Hungary) Urban districts: Kismarton (Eisenstadt) (Austria) , Rust (Austria)
46. Szilágy	Zilah (Zalău) (Romania)	1. Crasna (Romania); 2. Szilágycseh (Cehu Silvaniei) (Romania); 3. Szilágysomlyó (Șimleu Silvaniei) (Romania); 4. Tasnád (Tășnad) (Romania); 5. Zilah (Zalău) (Romania); 6. Zsibó (Jibou) (Romania); Urban districts: Szilágysomlyó (Șimleu Silvaniei) (Romania) , Zilah (Zalău) (Romania)
47. Jász-Nagykun-Szolnok	Szolnok (Hungary)	1. Alsó-Jászság (seat Jászapáti) (Hungary); 2. Felső-Jászság (seat Jászberény) (Hungary); 3. Alsó-Tisza (seat Tiszaföldvár) (Hungary); 4. Felső-Tisza (seat Kenderes, from 1895 Kunhegyes) (Hungary); 5. Közép-Tisza (seat Tiszaroff, Törökszentmiklós) (Hungary); Urban districts: 1. Jászberény (Hungary); 2. Karcag (Hungary); 3. Kisújszállás (Hungary); 4. Mezőtúr (Hungary); 5. Szolnok (Hungary); 6. Túrkeve (Hungary); 7. Jászárokszállás (until 1886) (Hungary); 8. Kunhegyes (until 1893) (Hungary); 9. Kunszentmárton (until 1895) (Hungary)
48. Hajdú	Debrecen (Hungary)	1. Nagyudvar (from 1901 — district Hajdúszoboszló) (Hungary); 2. Balmazújváros (from 1901 — Központ and Hajdúböszörmény) (Hungary); Urban districts at different times: Debrecen (Hungary) , Hajdúböszörmény (Hungary) , Hajdúnánás (Hungary) , Hajdúszoboszló (Hungary) , Hajdúdorog (Hungary)

=== Counties of Transylvania ===
County	Capital	Districts into which the county was divided and their centres
1. Alsó-Fehér	Nagyenyed (Aiud) (Romania)	1. Alvinc (Vințu de Jos) (Romania); 2. Balázsfalva (Blaj) (Romania); 3. Kisenyed (seat Vizakna, now Ocna Sibiului) (Romania); 4. Magyarigen (Ighiu) (Romania); 5. Marosújvár (Ocna Mureș) (Romania); 6. Nagyenyed (Aiud) (Romania); 7. Verespatak (Roșia Montană) (Romania); 8. Tövis (Teiuș) (Romania); Urban districts: 1. Abrudbánya (Abrud) (Romania); 2. Gyulafehérvár (Alba Iulia) (Romania); 3. Nagyenyed (Aiud) (Romania); 4. Vizakna (Ocna Sibiului) (Romania)
2. Hunyad	Déva (Deva) (Romania)	1. Körösbánya (Baia de Criș) (Romania); 2. Brad (Romania); 3. Algyógy (seat Algyógyalfalu, now Geoagiu) (Romania); 4. Déva (Romania); 5. Hátszeg (Hațeg) (Romania); 6. Marosillye (Ilia) (Romania); 7. Petrozsény (Petroșani) (Romania); 8. Pui (Romania); 9. Szászváros (Orăștie) (Romania); 10. Vajdahunyad (Hunedoara) (Romania); Urban districts: 1. Déva (Romania); 2. Hátszeg (Hațeg) (Romania); 3. Szászváros (Orăștie) (Romania); 4. Vajdahunyad (Hunedoara) (Romania)
3. Szolnok-Doboka	Dés (Dej) (Romania)	1. Betlen (Beclean) (Romania); 2. Csákigorbó (Gârbou) (Romania); 3. Dés (Dej) (Romania); 4. Szamosújvár (Gherla) (Romania); 5. Kékes (Chiochiș) (Romania); 6. Magyarlapos (Târgu Lăpuș) (Romania); 7. Nagyilonda (Ilva / Ilenda) (Romania); 8. Kapolnokmonostor (Căpâlnaș-Mănăștur) (from 1910) (Romania); Urban districts: Dés (Dej) (Romania) , Szamosújvár (Gherla) (Romania)
4. Kolozs	Kolozsvár (Cluj-Napoca) (Romania)	1. Bánffyhunyad (Huedin) (Romania); 2. Gyalu (Gilău) (Romania); 3. Hidalmás (Hida) (Romania); 4. Kolozsvár (Cluj-Napoca) (Romania); 5. Mezőörményes (Urmeniş) (Romania); 6. Móc (Mociu) (Romania); 7. Nádasmente (seat also Kolozsvár, now Cluj-Napoca) (Romania); 8. Nagysármás (Sărmașu) (Romania); 9. Teke (Teaca) (Romania); City with municipal rights: Kolozsvár (Cluj-Napoca) (Romania) Urban district: Kolozs (Cojocna) (Romania)
5. Kis-Küküllő	Dicsőszentmárton (Târnăveni) (Romania)	1. Dicsőszentmárton (Târnăveni) (Romania); 2. Erzsébetváros (Dumbrăveni) (Romania); 3. Hosszúaszó (Valea Lungă) (Romania); 4. Radnót (Iernut) (Romania); Urban districts: 1. Dicsőszentmárton (Târnăveni) (Romania); 2. Erzsébetváros (Dumbrăveni) (Romania)
6. Torda-Aranyos	Torda (Turda) (Romania)	1. Torda (Turda) (Romania); 2. Alsóvára (Iara) (Romania); 3. Torockó (Rimetea) (Romania); 4. Felvinc (Unirea) (Romania); 5. Marosludas (Luduș) (Romania); 6. Topánfalva (Câmpeni) (Romania); Urban district: Torda (Turda) (Romania)
7. Fogaras	Fogaras (Făgăraș) (Romania)	1. Alsóárpás (Arpașu de Jos) (Romania); 2. Fogaras (Făgăraș) (Romania); 3. Sárkány (Șercaia) (Romania); 4. Törcsvár/Bran (Zernest, now Zărnești) (Romania); Urban district: Fogaras (Făgăraș) (Romania)
8. Beszterce-Naszód	Beszterce (Bistrița) (Romania)	1. Besenyő, now Viișoara (seat Beszterce Bistrița) (Romania); 2. Jád, now Livezile (seat Beszterce Bistrița) (Romania); 3. Naszód (Năsăud) (Romania); 4. Óradna (Rodna) (Romania); Urban district: Beszterce (Bistrița) (Romania)
9. Brassó	Brassó (Brașov) (Romania)	1. Alvidék (Földvár, now Feldioara) (Romania); 2. Felvidék (Brassó, now Brașov, formerly Feketehalom, now Codlea) (Romania); 3. Hétfalu (Hosszúfalu, now part of Săcele) (Romania)
10. Maros-Torda	Marosvásárhely (Târgu Mureș) (Romania)	1. Alsó-Maros (Marosvásárhely, now Târgu Mureș) (Romania); 2. Felső-Maros (Marosvásárhely, now Târgu Mureș) (Romania); 3. Nyárádszereda (Miercurea Nirajului) (Romania); 4. Alsó-Szászrégén (Szászrégen, now Reghin) (Romania); 5. Felső-Szászrégén (Magyarrégen, now Reghin-Sat, part of Reghin) (Romania); City with municipal rights: Marosvásárhely (Târgu Mureș) (Romania) Urban district: Szászrégen (Reghin) (Romania)
11. Udvarhely	Székelyudvarhely (Odorheiu Secuiesc) (Romania)	1. Homoród (Ocland) (Romania); 2. Parajd (Praid) (Romania); 3. Székelykeresztúr (Cristuru Secuiesc) (Romania); 4. Udvarhely (Székelyudvarhely, now Odorheiu Secuiesc) (Romania); Urban district: Székelyudvarhely (Odorheiu Secuiesc) (Romania)
12. Csík	Csíkszereda (Miercurea Ciuc) (Romania)	1. Kászonaltíz (Csíkszentmárton, now Sânmartin) (Romania); 2. Gyergyószentmiklós (Gheorgheni) (Romania); 3. Gyergyótölgyes (Tulgheș) (Romania); 4. Felcsík (Csíkszereda, now Miercurea Ciuc) (Romania); 5. Szépvíz (Frumoasa) (Romania); Urban district: Csíkszereda (Miercurea Ciuc) (Romania)
13. Nagy-Küküllő	Segesvár (Sighișoara) (Romania)	1. Szentágota (Agnita) (Romania); 2. Kőhalom (Rupea) (Romania); 3. Nagysink (Cincu) (Romania); 4. Segesvár (Sighișoara) (Romania); 5. Medgyes (Mediaș) (Romania); Urban districts: 1. Segesvár (Sighișoara) (Romania); 2. Medgyes (Mediaș) (Romania)
14. Szeben	Nagyszeben (Sibiu) (Romania)	1. Nagydisznód (Cisnădie) (Romania); 2. Nagyszeben (Sibiu) (Romania); 3. Szászsebes (Sebeș) (Romania); 4. Szelistye (Săliște) (Romania); 5. Szenterzsébet (Miercurea Sibiului) (Romania); 6. Újegyház (Noșlac) (Romania); Urban districts: 1. Nagyszeben (Sibiu) (Romania); 2. Szászsebes (Sebeș) (Romania)
15. Háromszék	Sepsiszentgyörgy (Sfântu Gheorghe) (Romania)	1. Kézdi (Kézdivásárhely, now Târgu Secuiesc) (Romania); 2. Miklósvár/Miklósvár (Nagyajta, now Aita Mare) (Romania); 3. Orbai (seat Covasna) (Romania); 4. Sepsi (seat Sepsiszentgyörgy, now Sfântu Gheorghe) (Romania); Urban districts: 1. Kézdivásárhely, now Târgu Secuiesc (Romania); 2. Sepsiszentgyörgy, now Sfântu Gheorghe (Romania)

=== Counties of Croatia and Slavonia ===
County	Capital	Districts into which the county was divided and their centres
1. Zagreb	Agram (Zagreb) (Croatia)	1. Dugo Selo (Croatia); 2. Glina (Croatia); 3. Jaska (Jastrebarsko) (Croatia); 4. Karolyváros (Karlovac) (Croatia); 5. Kostajnica (Hrvatska Kostajnica) (Croatia); 6. Nagygorica (Velika Gorica) (Croatia); 7. Petrinja (Croatia); 8. Pisarovina (Croatia); 9. Samobor (Croatia); 10. Stubica (Donja Stubica) (Croatia); 11. Szentiván Zelina (Sveti Ivan Zelina) (Croatia); 12. Sziszek (Sisak) (Croatia); 13. Topusko (Topusko) (Croatia); 14. Dvor (Croatia); 15. Zagreb (Zagreb) (Croatia); City with municipal rights: Zagreb (Croatia) Urban districts: Karolyváros (Karlovac) (Croatia) , Petrinja (Croatia) , Sziszek (Sisak) (Croatia)
2. Varaždin	Varašd (Varaždin) (Croatia)	1. Ivanec (Croatia); 2. Klanjec (Croatia); 3. Krapina (Croatia); 4. Ludbreg (Croatia); 5. Novi Marof (Croatia); 6. Pregrada (Croatia); 7. Varašd (Varaždin) (Croatia); 8. Zlatar (Zlator) (Croatia); City with municipal rights: Varaždin (Croatia)
3. Bjelovar-Križevci	Bjelovar (Bjelovar)	1. Bjelovar (Bjelovar) (Croatia); 2. Čazma (Croatia); 3. Szentgyörgy (Đurđevac) (Croatia); 4. Garešnica (Croatia); 5. Grubišno Polje (Croatia); 6. Kapronca (Koprivnica) (Croatia); 7. Kőrös (Križevci) (Croatia); 8. Kutina (Croatia); Urban districts: Bjelovar (Bjelovar) (Croatia) , Kapronca (Koprivnica) (Croatia) , Kőrös (Križevci) (Croatia)
4. Verőce	Eszek (Osijek) (Croatia)	1. Alsómiholjac (Donji Miholjac) (Croatia); 2. Diakovár (Đakovo) (Croatia); 3. Eszek (Osijek) (Croatia); 4. Nasice (Našice) (Croatia); 5. Slatina (Croatia); 6. Verőce (Virovitica) (Croatia); Urban district: Eszek (Osijek) (Croatia)
5. Lika-Krbava	Gospić (Croatia)	1. Alsólapac (Donji Lapac) (Croatia); 2. Brinje (Croatia); 3. Gospić (Croatia); 4. Gračac (Croatia); 5. Korenica (Croatia); 6. Otočac (Otočac) (Croatia); 7. Perušić (Perušić) (Croatia); 8. Udbina (Croatia); 9. Zengg (Senj) (Croatia); Urban district: Zengg (Senj) (Croatia)
6. Modrus-Fiume	Ogulin (Croatia)	1. Čabar (Croatia); 2. Crikvenica (Croatia); 3. Delnice (Croatia); 4. Ogulin (Croatia); 5. Sušak (seat Bakar) (Croatia); 6. Slunj (Croatia); 7. Vojnić (Croatia); 8. Vrbovsko (Croatia)
7. Pozsega	Pozsega (Požega) (Croatia)	1. Brod (Slavonski Brod) (Croatia); 2. Daruvar (Croatia); 3. Pakrac (Croatia); 4. Novska (Croatia); 5. Újgradiška (Nova Gradiška) (Croatia); 6. Požega (Croatia); Urban districts: Brod (Slavonski Brod) (Croatia) , Požega (Croatia)
8. Szerém	Vukovar (Croatia)	1. Ireg (Irig) (Serbia); 2. Szávaszentdemeter/Mitrovica (Sremska Mitrovica) (Serbia); 3. Ópazova (Stara Pazova) (Serbia); 4. Šid (Serbia); 5. Újlak (Ilok) (Croatia); 6. Vinkovce (Vinkovci) (Croatia); 7. Vukovar (Croatia); 8. Zimony (Zemun) (Serbia); 9. Ruma (Serbia); 10. Županja (Croatia); City with municipal rights: Zimony (Zemun) (Serbia) Urban districts: Karlóca (Sremski Karlovci) (Serbia) , Pétervárad (Petrovaradin) (Serbia) , Szávaszentdemeter (Sremska Mitrovica) (Serbia)

Also, the port of Fiume (now Rijeka, Croatia) with its surrounding territories was part of Transleithania and was and was the only Hungarian seaport.
