= Oslany =

- Municipality
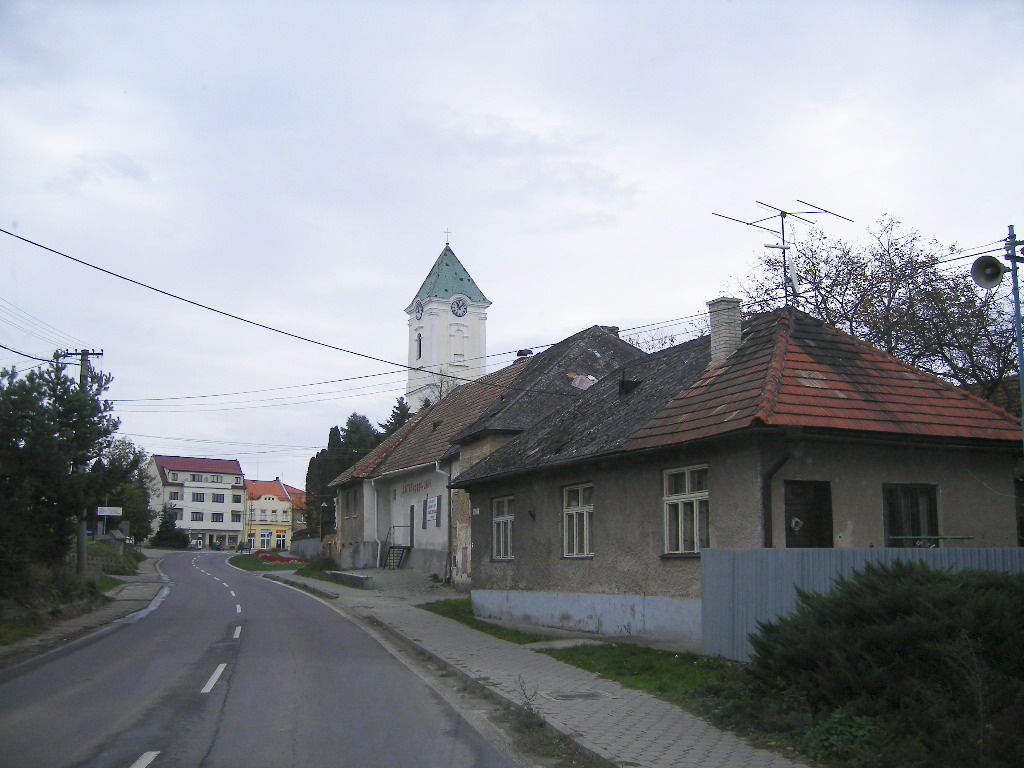

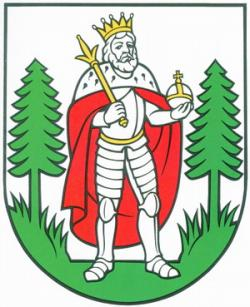
- Flag Coat of arms

- Location of Oslany in the Trenčín Region Location of Oslany in Slovakia
- Coordinates: 48.63°N 18.47°E
- Country: Slovakia
- Region: Trenčín Region
- District: Prievidza District
- First mentioned: 1254

Area
  - Total: 25.15 km^{2} (9.71 sq mi)
- Elevation: 274 m (899 ft)

Population (2025)
  - Total: 2,417
- Time zone: UTC+1 (CET)
  - Summer (DST): UTC+2 (CEST)
- Postal code: 972 47
- Area code: +421 46
- Vehicle registration plate (until 2022): PD
- Website: www.oslany.sk

Oslany (Hungarian: Oszlány) is a town and municipality in Prievidza District in the Trenčín Region of western Slovakia.

== History ==
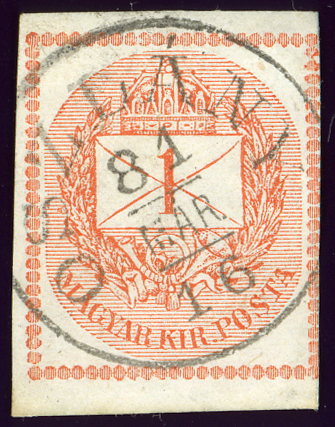
OSZLÁNY in the Kingdom of Hungary in 1881

In historical records the village was first mentioned in 1254.

While the Ottomans occupied most of central Europe, the region north of lake Balaton remained in the Kingdom of Hungary. Until 1918, the town named Oszlány was part of Austria-Hungary, Transleithania after the compromise of 1867.

== Geography ==
The municipality lies at an altitude of 274 metres (899 ft) and covers an area of 25.15 km^{2} (9.71 sq mi) (2025).

== Population ==
Population statistic (10 years)
Year	1995	2005	2015	2025
Count	2124	2238	2403	2417
Difference		+5.36%	+7.37%	+0.58%

Population statistic
Year	2024	2025
Count	2399	2417
Difference		+0.75%

It has a population of 2417 people (31 December 2025).

=== Ethnicity ===
Census 2021 (1+ %)
Ethnicity	Number	Fraction
Slovak	2333	98.35%
Not found out	31	1.3%
Total	2372	

In year 2021 was 2372 people by ethnicity 2333 as Slovak, 31 as Not found out, 20 as Romani, 9 as Czech, 4 as Russian, 4 as German, 4 as Other, 2 as Irish, 2 as Rusyn, 2 as Hungarian, 2 as Canadian, 1 as Silesian and 1 as Austrian.

Note on population: The difference values of population numbers in the table "Population statistic" and in the sections "Ethnicity" & "Religion" is caused by the use of various statistical methods.

=== Religion ===
Census 2021 (1+ %)
Religion	Number	Fraction
Roman Catholic Church	1793	75.59%
None	448	18.89%
Not found out	58	2.45%
Christian Congregations in Slovakia	26	1.1%
Total	2372	

In year 2021 was 2372 people by religion 1793 from Roman Catholic Church, 448 from None, 58 from Not found out, 26 from Christian Congregations in Slovakia, 12 from Evangelical Church, 9 from Ad hoc movements, 6 from Greek Catholic Church, 4 from Calvinist Church, 4 from Other and not ascertained christian church, 3 from Old Catholic Church, 3 from Paganism and natural spirituality, 3 from Other, 1 from Eastern Orthodox Church, 1 from Church of the Brethren and 1 from Buddhism.

== Street names ==
The village of Oslany includes the following streets: Antona Bernoláka, Družstevná, Hviezdoslavova, Jarmočná, Mierová, Mlynská, Námestie slobody, Obuvnícka, Pekárenská, Potočná, Slovenského národného povstania, Staničná, Školská, Športová, Ulička, Východná, Záhradná and Žarnovská
