= Krasna, Ivano-Frankivsk Oblast =

Rural locality in Ivano-Frankivsk Oblast, Ukraine

Krasna Красна
- Village
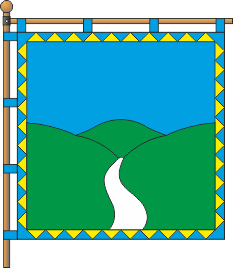
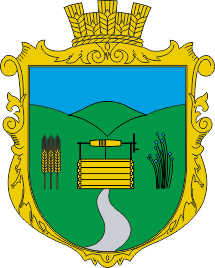
- Flag Coat of arms

- Location within Ivano-Frankivsk Oblast Location within Ukraine
- Coordinates: 48°34′35″N 24°41′53″E
- Country: Ukraine
- Oblast (province): Ivano-Frankivsk Oblast
- Raion (district): Nadvirna Raion
- Hromada (municipality): Nadvirna
- Founded: 1552
- Elevation: 458 m (1,503 ft)

Population (2001)
  - Total: 3,226
- Postal code: 78451
- Area code: +380 03475

Krasna (Ukrainian: Красна) is a village in Nadvirna Raion of Ivano-Frankivsk Oblast of Ukraine. It belongs to the Nadvirna settlement hromada, one of the hromadas of Ukraine.

== Geography ==
The village is located 4 kilometers from Lanchyn and 12 kilometers from Nadvirna. The town is next to the Krasna river, and the Krasna forest preserve is located to the west.

== History ==
The first written mention of the village dates back to 1455. There is an eight-year school, a library, a medical center with a maternity ward, a theater, a communication branch, and a bank in Krasna.
