= Jesenské, Rimavská Sobota District =

Jesenské Feled
- Municipality
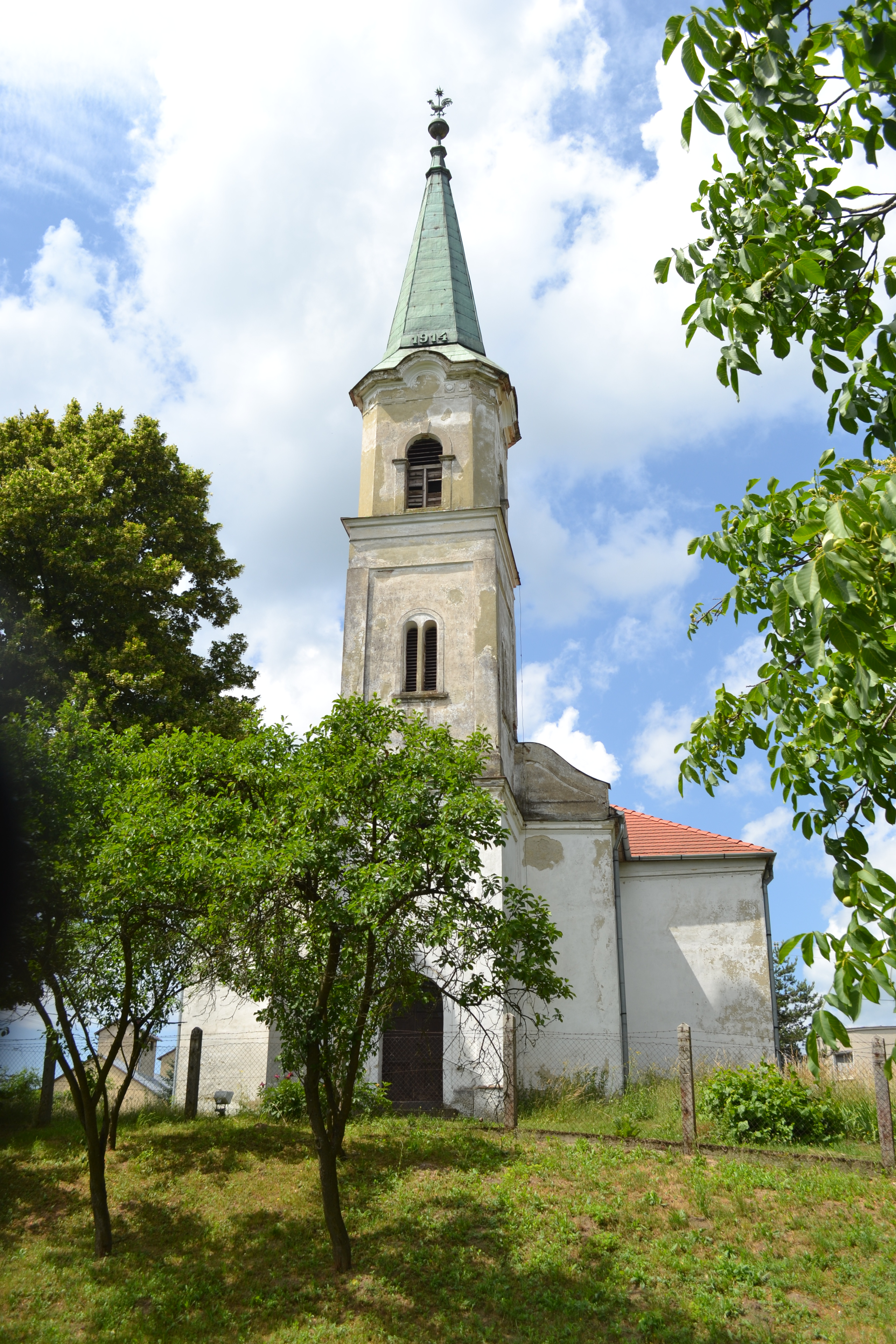

- Flag

- Location of Jesenské in the Banská Bystrica Region Location of Jesenské in Slovakia
- Coordinates: 48°18′N 20°04′E
- Country: Slovakia
- Region: Banská Bystrica Region
- District: Rimavská Sobota District
- First mentioned: 1274

Area
  - Total: 17.13 km^{2} (6.61 sq mi)
- Elevation: 186 m (610 ft)

Population (2025)
  - Total: 2,357
- Time zone: UTC+1 (CET)
  - Summer (DST): UTC+2 (CEST)
- Postal code: 980 02
- Area code: +421 47
- Vehicle registration plate (until 2022): RS
- Website: www.jesenske.sk

Jesenské (formerly: Feledince; Hungarian: Feled) is a village and municipality in the Rimavská Sobota District of the Banská Bystrica Region of southern Slovakia.

== History ==
The first mention is from 1274. In 1424, the village is noticed as property of the Feledys. As early as the Middle Ages, the village was important agricultural centre of the region. In 1553 was the village pillaged. From 1938 to 1945, it belonged to Hungary. Jesenské had been in 20th century seat of the Jesenské District.

== Population ==
Population statistic (10 years)
Year	1995	2005	2015	2025
Count	2242	2287	2233	2357
Difference		+2.00%	−2.36%	+5.55%

Population statistic
Year	2024	2025
Count	2351	2357
Difference		+0.25%

It has a population of 2357 people (31 December 2025).

=== Ethnicity ===
Census 2021 (1+ %)
Ethnicity	Number	Fraction
Hungarian	1338	57.3%
Slovak	736	31.52%
Romani	515	22.05%
Not found out	74	3.16%
Total	2335	

In year 2021 was 2335 people by ethnicity 1338 as Hungarian, 736 as Slovak, 515 as Romani, 74 as Not found out, 8 as Czech, 3 as German, 2 as Chinese, 2 as Other, 2 as English, 1 as Ukrainian, 1 as Russian, 1 as Austrian and 1 as Polish.

Note on population: The difference values of population numbers in the table "Population statistic" and in the sections "Ethnicity" & "Religion" is caused by the use of various statistical methods.

=== Religion ===
Census 2021 (1+ %)
Religion	Number	Fraction
Roman Catholic Church	1155	49.46%
None	730	31.26%
Not found out	156	6.68%
Calvinist Church	153	6.55%
Evangelical Church	48	2.06%
Jehovah's Witnesses	41	1.76%
Total	2335	

In year 2021 was 2335 people by religion 1155 from Roman Catholic Church, 730 from None, 156 from Not found out, 153 from Calvinist Church, 48 from Evangelical Church, 41 from Jehovah's Witnesses, 21 from Greek Catholic Church, 14 from Christian Congregations in Slovakia, 10 from Other and not ascertained christian church, 2 from Eastern Orthodox Church, 1 from Old Catholic Church, 1 from Islam, 1 from Other, 1 from United Methodist Church and 1 from Ad hoc movements.

== Economy and infrastructure ==
Municipal office had been built in 1936. The village is important railway crossroad, as the Bratislava-Košice line crosses with a Jesenské-Tisovec line. In 2012 small reconstruction of the village center began. In 1922 a football club was established, which is one of the best sport clubs in the village.

== See also ==
- List of municipalities and towns in Slovakia

== Genealogical resources ==
The records for genealogical research are available at the state archive "Statny Archiv in Banska Bystrica, Slovakia"

- Roman Catholic church records (births/marriages/deaths): 1768-1878 (parish A)
- Reformed church records (births/marriages/deaths): 1786-1878 (parish B)
