= Kirchberg an der Pielach =

- Municipality
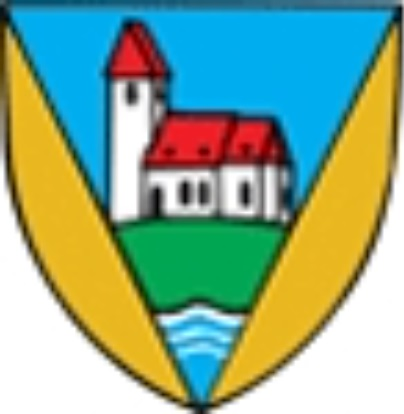
- Coat of arms

- Location within Austria
- Coordinates: 48°1′N 15°26′E
- Country: Austria
- State: Lower Austria
- District: Sankt Pölten-Land

Government
  - Mayor: Martin Robausch

Area
  - Total: 63.5 km^{2} (24.5 sq mi)
- Elevation: 371 m (1,217 ft)

Population (2018-01-01)
  - Total: 3,225
  - Density: 50.8/km^{2} (132/sq mi)
- Time zone: UTC+1 (CET)
  - Summer (DST): UTC+2 (CEST)
- Postal code: 3204
- Area code: 02722
- Website: http://www.kirchberg-pielach.at

Kirchberg an der Pielach is a town in the district of Sankt Pölten-Land in the Austrian state of Lower Austria.

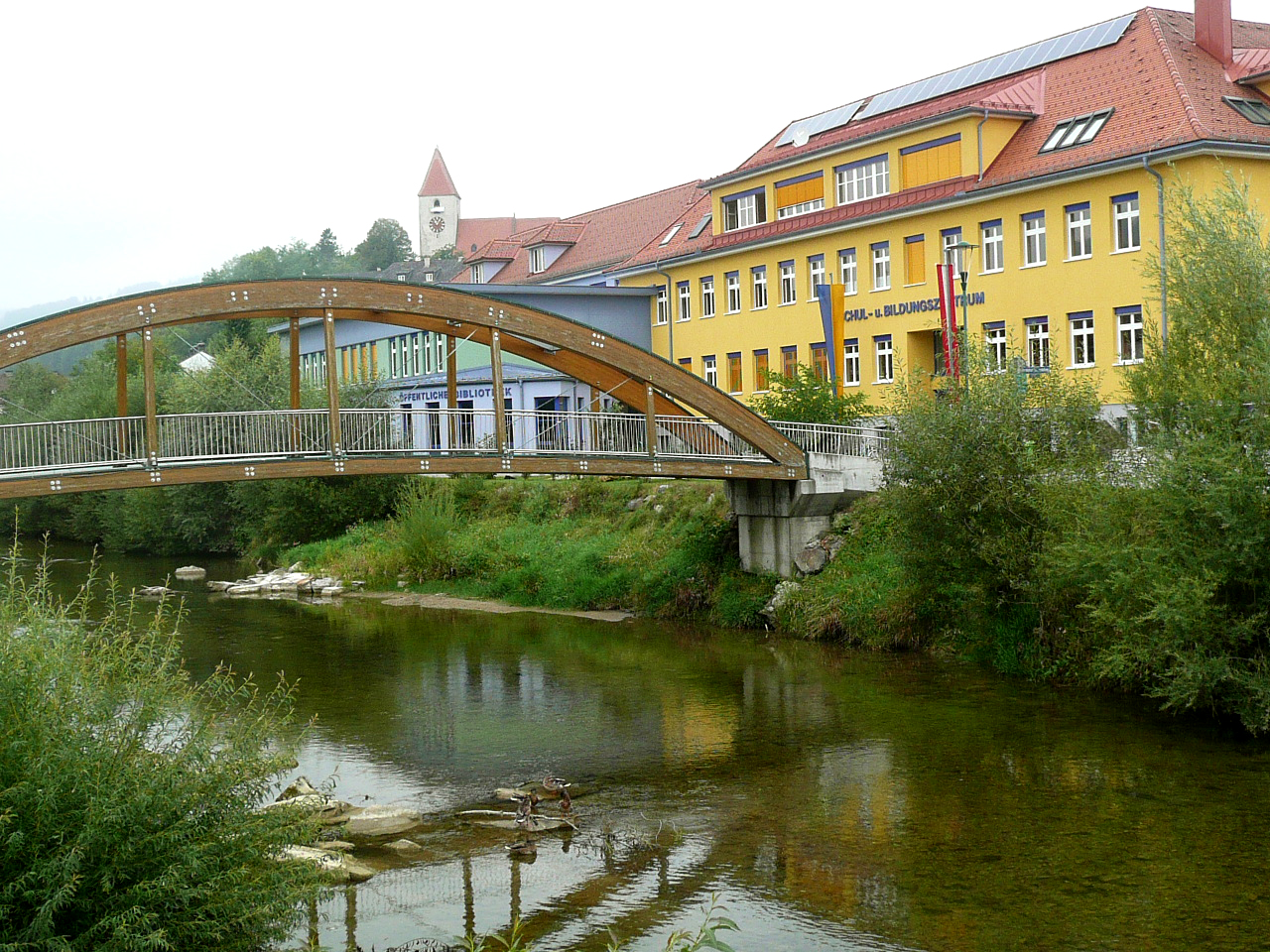
A bridge on the Pielach river, the school and Saint Martin Pfarrkirche in background.

== Population ==
Historical population
Year	Pop.	±%
1971	2,692	—
1981	2,918	+8.4%
1991	3,197	+9.6%
2001	3,168	−0.9%
2018	3,225	+1.8%
2019	3,221	−0.1%
