= Stanivtsi =

Commune in Chernivtsi Oblast, Ukraine

Coordinates: 48.0728°N 26.0650°E

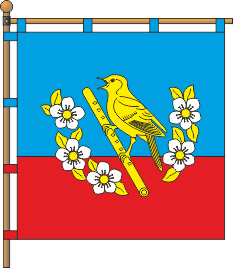
Flag of the village of Stanivtsi

Stanivtsi (Ukrainian: Станівці; Romanian: Stănești; German: Stanestie am Sereth) is a commune (selsoviet) in Chernivtsi Raion, Chernivtsi Oblast, Ukraine. It is composed of a single village, Stanivtsi. It belongs to Tarashany rural hromada, one of the hromadas of Ukraine.

Until 18 July 2020, Stanivtsi belonged to Hlyboka Raion. The raion was abolished in July 2020 as part of the administrative reform of Ukraine, which reduced the number of raions of Chernivtsi Oblast to three. The area of Hlyboka Raion was merged into Chernivtsi Raion. In 2001, 98.43% of the inhabitants spoke Romanian as their native language. In 2001, 98.43% of the inhabitants spoke Romanian as their native language, while 1.36% spoke Ukrainian.
