= Hartmanice (Svitavy District) =

- Municipality
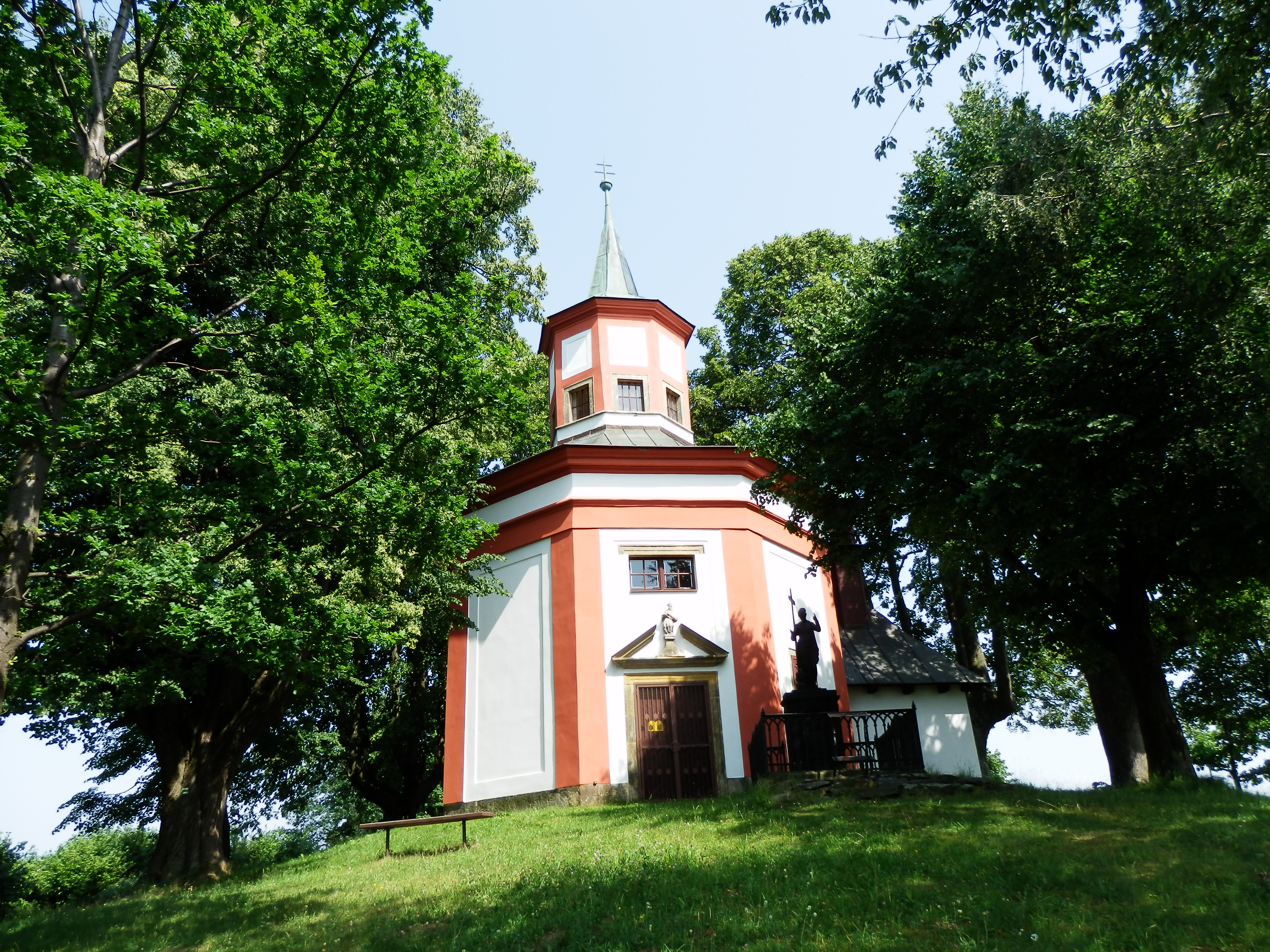
- Chapel of Saint John of Nepomuk

- Flag Coat of arms

- Location in the Czech Republic
- Coordinates: 49°37′31″N 16°22′23″E
- Country: Czech Republic
- Region: Pardubice
- District: Svitavy
- First mentioned: 1437

Area
  - Total: 6.13 km^{2} (2.37 sq mi)
- Elevation: 608 m (1,995 ft)

Population (2026-01-01)
  - Total: 249
  - Density: 40.6/km^{2} (105/sq mi)
- Time zone: UTC+1 (CET)
  - Summer (DST): UTC+2 (CEST)
- Postal code: 569 92
- Website: www.hartmanice.net

Hartmanice (German: Hartmannitz) is a municipality and village in Svitavy District in the Pardubice Region of the Czech Republic. It has about 200 inhabitants.

== History ==
The first written mention of Hartmanice is in a donation deed of Emperor Sigismund from 1437.

== Demographics ==
Historical population
Year	Pop.	±%
1869	632	—
1880	576	−8.9%
1890	634	+10.1%
1900	661	+4.3%
1910	594	−10.1%
1921	556	−6.4%
1930	504	−9.4%
1950	378	−25.0%
1961	387	+2.4%
1970	349	−9.8%
1980	322	−7.7%
1991	273	−15.2%
2001	250	−8.4%
2011	286	+14.4%
2021	271	−5.2%
Source: Censuses

== Sights ==
The Chapel of Saint John of Nepomuk on a hill above the village was built in the early 18th century.
