= Mank, Austria =

Mank
- Municipality
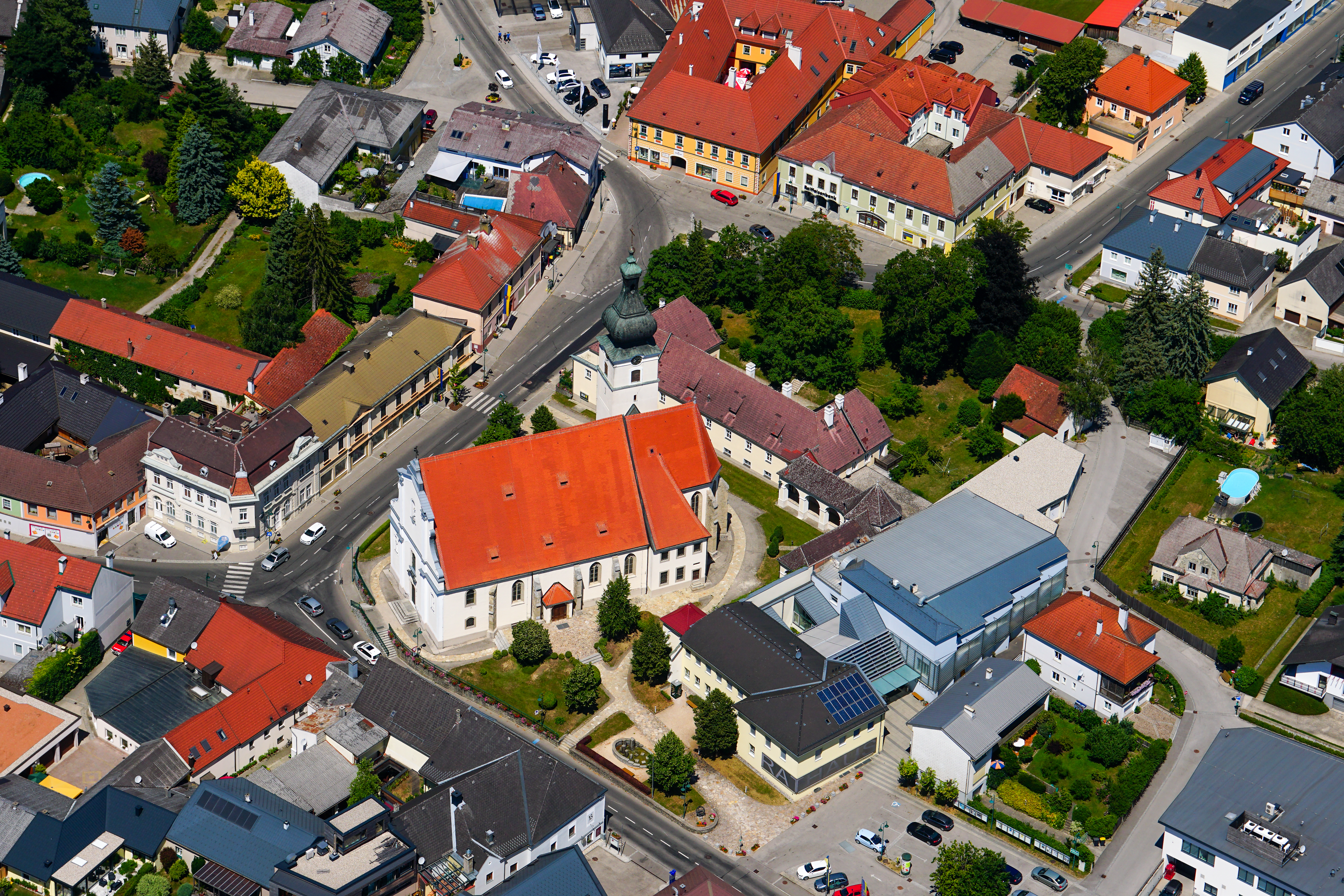
- Aerial view of the church and town hall

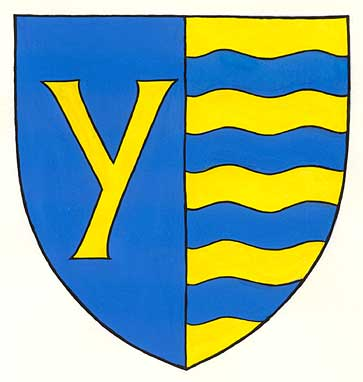
- Coat of arms

- Location within Austria
- Coordinates: 48°7′N 15°20′E
- Country: Austria
- State: Lower Austria
- District: Melk

Government
  - Mayor: Martin Leonhardsberger (ÖVP)

Area
  - Total: 33.38 km^{2} (12.89 sq mi)
- Elevation: 295 m (968 ft)

Population (2018-01-01)
  - Total: 3,219
  - Density: 96.43/km^{2} (249.8/sq mi)
- Time zone: UTC+1 (CET)
  - Summer (DST): UTC+2 (CEST)
- Postal code: 3240
- Area code: 02755
- Website: www.mank.at

Mank is a town in the district of Melk in the Austrian state of Lower Austria.

== Population ==
Historical population
Year	Pop.	±%
1869	1,829	—
1880	2,046	+11.9%
1890	2,170	+6.1%
1900	2,371	+9.3%
1910	2,513	+6.0%
1923	2,504	−0.4%
1934	2,575	+2.8%
1939	2,521	−2.1%
1951	2,517	−0.2%
1961	2,528	+0.4%
1971	2,653	+4.9%
1981	2,664	+0.4%
1991	2,684	+0.8%
2001	2,904	+8.2%
2011	3,047	+4.9%
