= Rimavská Seč =

Rimavská Seč Rimaszécs
- Municipality
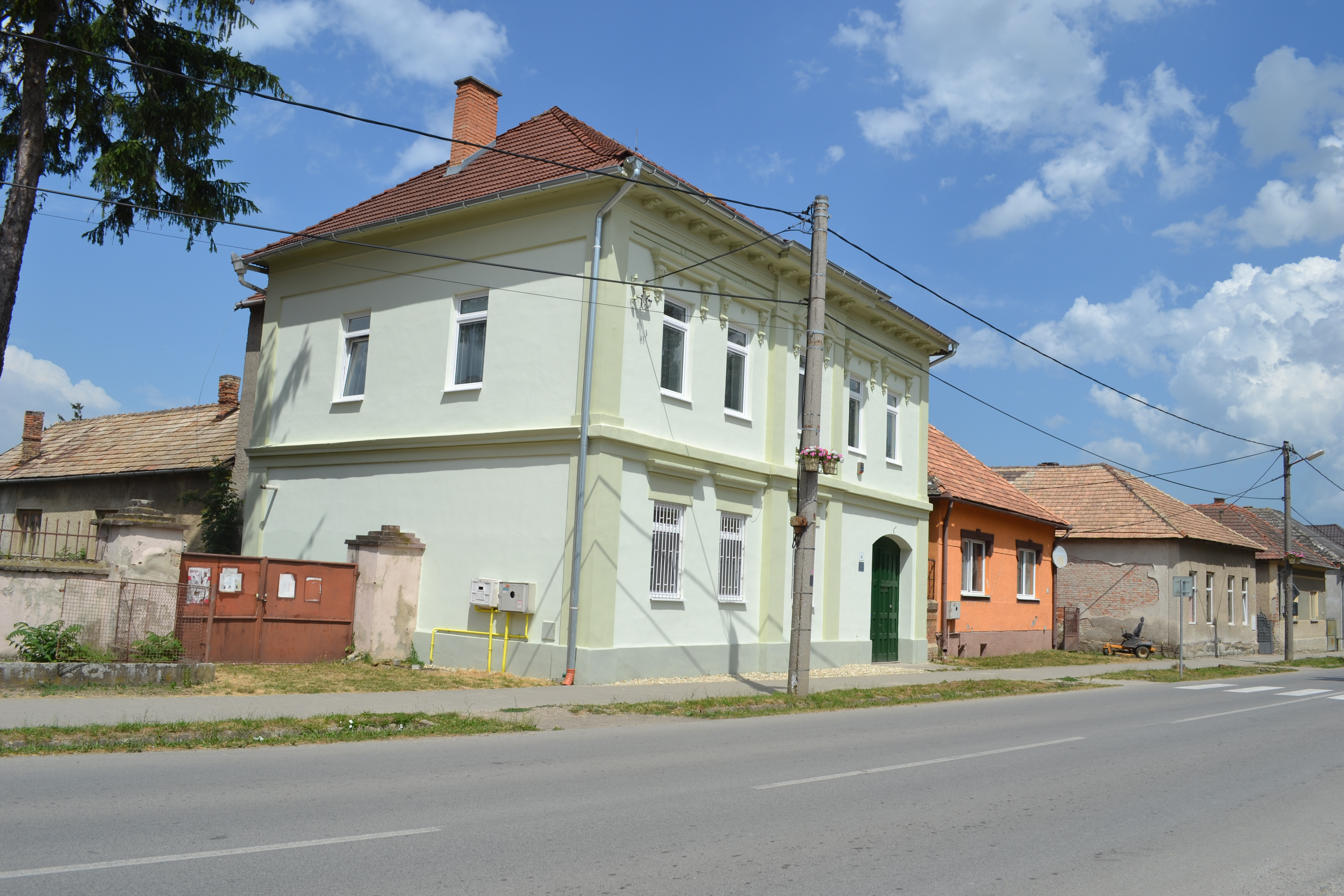

- Flag Coat of arms

- Location of Rimavská Seč in the Banská Bystrica Region Location of Rimavská Seč in Slovakia
- Coordinates: 48.30°N 20.25°E
- Country: Slovakia
- Region: Banská Bystrica Region
- District: Rimavská Sobota District
- First mentioned: 1289

Government
  - Mayor: Márta Stubendek (SZÖVETSÉG-ALIANCIA)

Area
  - Total: 17.32 km^{2} (6.69 sq mi)
- Elevation: 173 m (568 ft)

Population (2025)
  - Total: 2,234
- Time zone: UTC+1 (CET)
  - Summer (DST): UTC+2 (CEST)
- Postal code: 980 42
- Area code: +421 47
- Vehicle registration plate (until 2022): RS
- Website: www.rimavskasec.eu

Rimavská Seč (Hungarian: Rimaszécs) is a village and municipality with approx. 1,900, predominantly Hungarian inhabitants in the Rimavská Sobota District of the Banská Bystrica Region of southern Slovakia.

== Geography ==
The municipality lies at an altitude of 173 metres (568 ft) and covers an area of 17.32 km^{2} (6.69 sq mi) (2025).

== Population ==
Population statistic (10 years)
Year	1995	2005	2015	2025
Count	1716	1902	2056	2234
Difference		+10.83%	+8.09%	+8.65%

Population statistic
Year	2024	2025
Count	2219	2234
Difference		+0.67%

It has a population of 2234 people (31 December 2025).

=== Ethnicity ===
Census 2021 (1+ %)
Ethnicity	Number	Fraction
Hungarian	1806	84.07%
Romani	313	14.57%
Slovak	260	12.1%
Not found out	87	4.05%
Total	2148	

In year 2021 was 2148 people by ethnicity 1806 as Hungarian, 313 as Romani, 260 as Slovak, 87 as Not found out, 2 as Rusyn, 1 as Czech and 1 as German.

Note on population: The difference values of population numbers in the table "Population statistic" and in the sections "Ethnicity" & "Religion" is caused by the use of various statistical methods.

The vast majority of the municipality's population consists of the local Roma community. In 2019, they constituted an estimated 75% of the local population.

=== Religion ===
Census 2021 (1+ %)
Religion	Number	Fraction
Roman Catholic Church	899	41.85%
Calvinist Church	648	30.17%
None	460	21.42%
Greek Catholic Church	57	2.65%
Not found out	40	1.86%
Evangelical Church	22	1.02%
Total	2148	

In year 2021 was 2148 people by religion 899 from Roman Catholic Church, 648 from Calvinist Church, 460 from None, 57 from Greek Catholic Church, 40 from Not found out, 22 from Evangelical Church, 18 from Jehovah's Witnesses, 2 from Seventh-day Adventist Church, 1 from Other and not ascertained christian church and 1 from Christian Congregations in Slovakia.
