= Libáň =

- Town
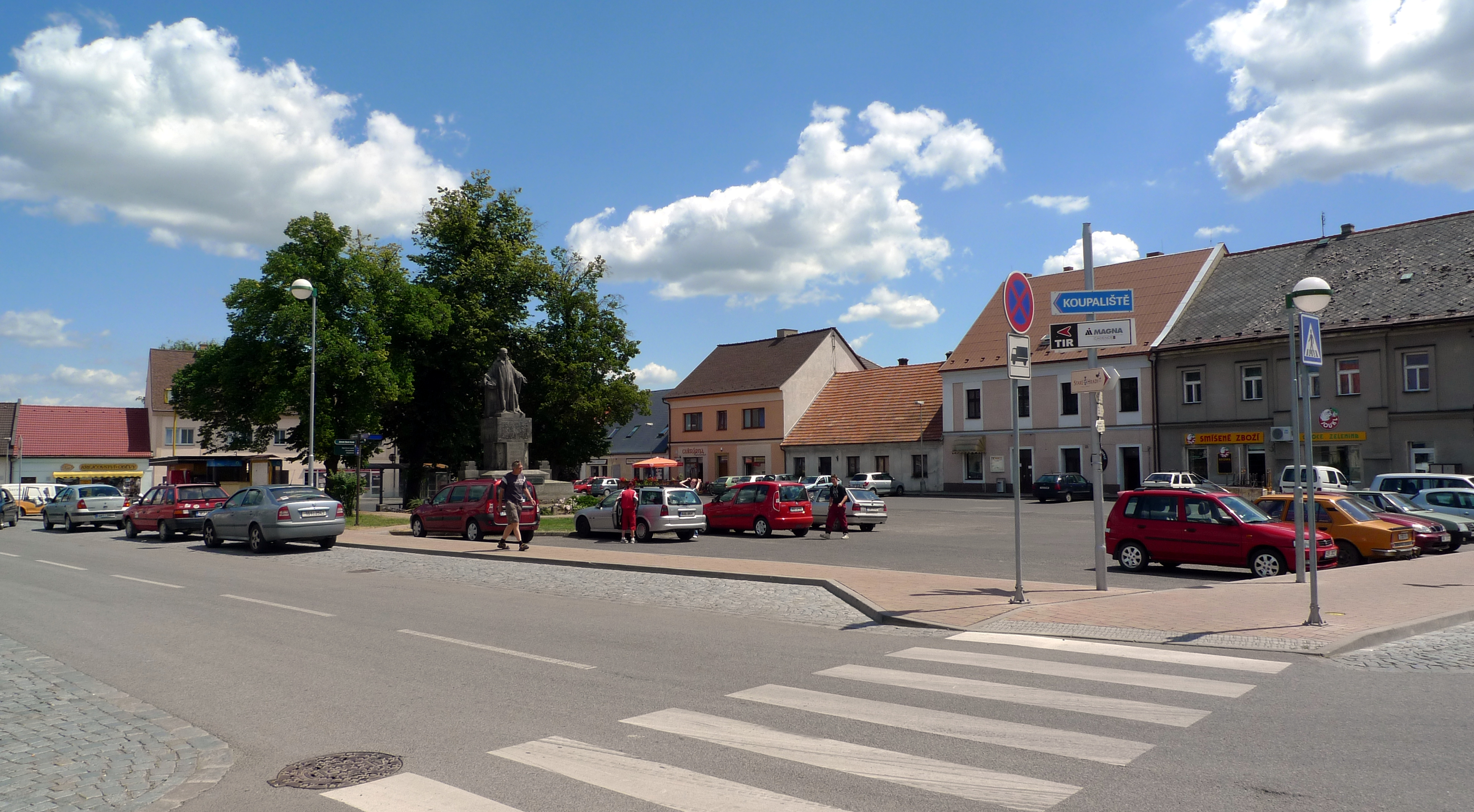
- Main square

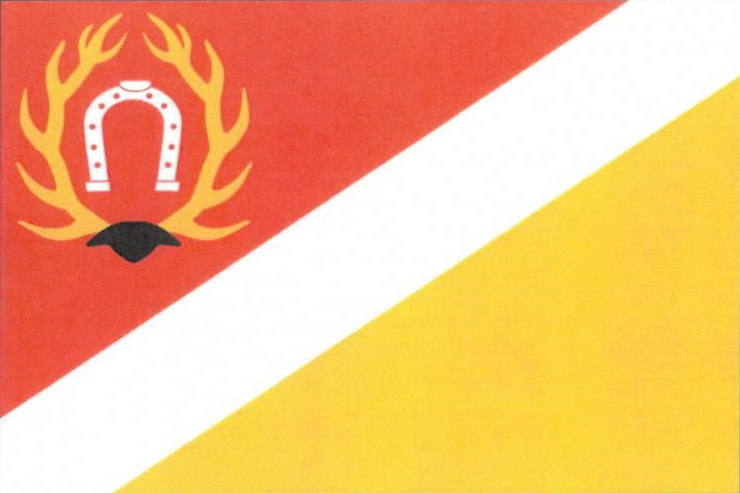
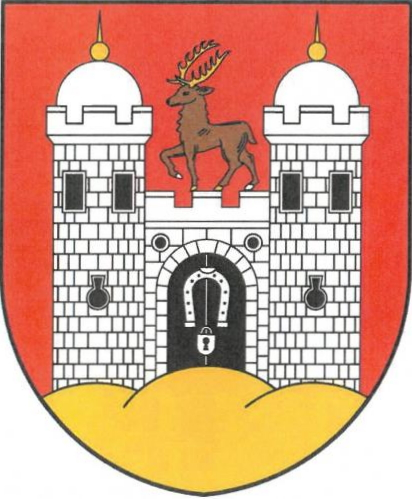
- Flag Coat of arms

- Location in the Czech Republic
- Coordinates: 50°22′31″N 15°13′5″E
- Country: Czech Republic
- Region: Hradec Králové
- District: Jičín
- First mentioned: 1340

Government
  - Mayor: Petr Soukup

Area
  - Total: 19.67 km^{2} (7.59 sq mi)
- Elevation: 238 m (781 ft)

Population (2026-01-01)
  - Total: 1,918
  - Density: 97.51/km^{2} (252.5/sq mi)
- Time zone: UTC+1 (CET)
  - Summer (DST): UTC+2 (CEST)
- Postal code: 507 23
- Website: www.mestoliban.cz

Libáň (Czech pronunciation: [ˈlɪbaːɲ]) is a town in Jičín District in the Hradec Králové Region of the Czech Republic. It has about 1,900 inhabitants.

== Administrative division ==
Libáň consists of five municipal parts (in brackets population according to the 2021 census):

- Libáň (1,584)
- Kozodírky (33)
- Křešice (54)
- Psinice (130)
- Zliv (49)

== Etymology ==
The name Libáň is derived from the personal name Liban, meaning "Liban's (court)".

== Geography ==
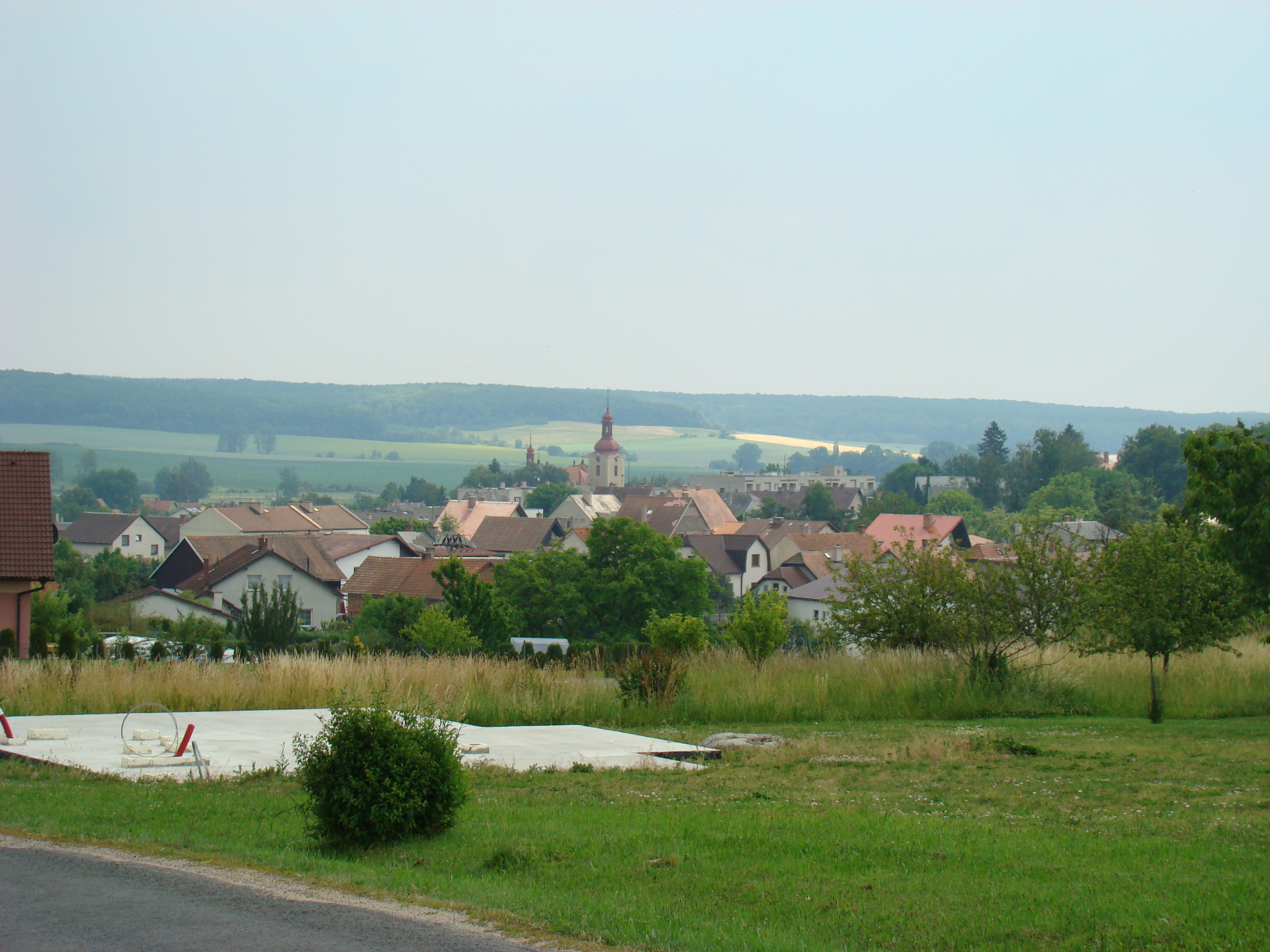
View towards Libáň

Libáň is located about 12 kilometres (7 mi) southwest of Jičín and 59 km (37 mi) northeast of Prague. It lies mostly in the Central Elbe Table. The northeastern part of the municipal territory belongs to the Jičín Uplands and includes the highest point of Libáň at 323 m (1,060 ft) above sea level. The stream Libáňský potok flows through the town. There are several fishponds around the town, the largest of which is Stejskal.

== History ==
The first written mention of Libáň is from 1340, when it was already referred to as a town. It belonged to the Staré Hrady estate and shared its owners. Libáň later lost the town status, but in 1574, it was again promoted to a town by Emperor Maximilian II.

== Demographics ==
Historical population

| Year | Pop. | ±% |
|---|---|---|
| 1869 | 2,746 | — |
| 1880 | 2,936 | +6.9% |
| 1890 | 3,106 | +5.8% |
| 1900 | 3,029 | −2.5% |
| 1910 | 3,033 | +0.1% |

| Year | Pop. | ±% |
|---|---|---|
| 1921 | 3,080 | +1.5% |
| 1930 | 3,100 | +0.6% |
| 1950 | 2,483 | −19.9% |
| 1961 | 2,353 | −5.2% |
| 1970 | 2,043 | −13.2% |

| Year | Pop. | ±% |
|---|---|---|
| 1980 | 1,896 | −7.2% |
| 1991 | 1,693 | −10.7% |
| 2001 | 1,696 | +0.2% |
| 2011 | 1,666 | −1.8% |
| 2021 | 1,850 | +11.0% |

Source: Censuses

== Economy ==
The largest employer in Libáň is Antolin Liban, a car parts manufacturer owned by Grupo Antolin. It employs about 750 people.

== Transport ==
There are no major roads passing through the municipality. The railway that runs through Libáň is unused.

== Sights ==
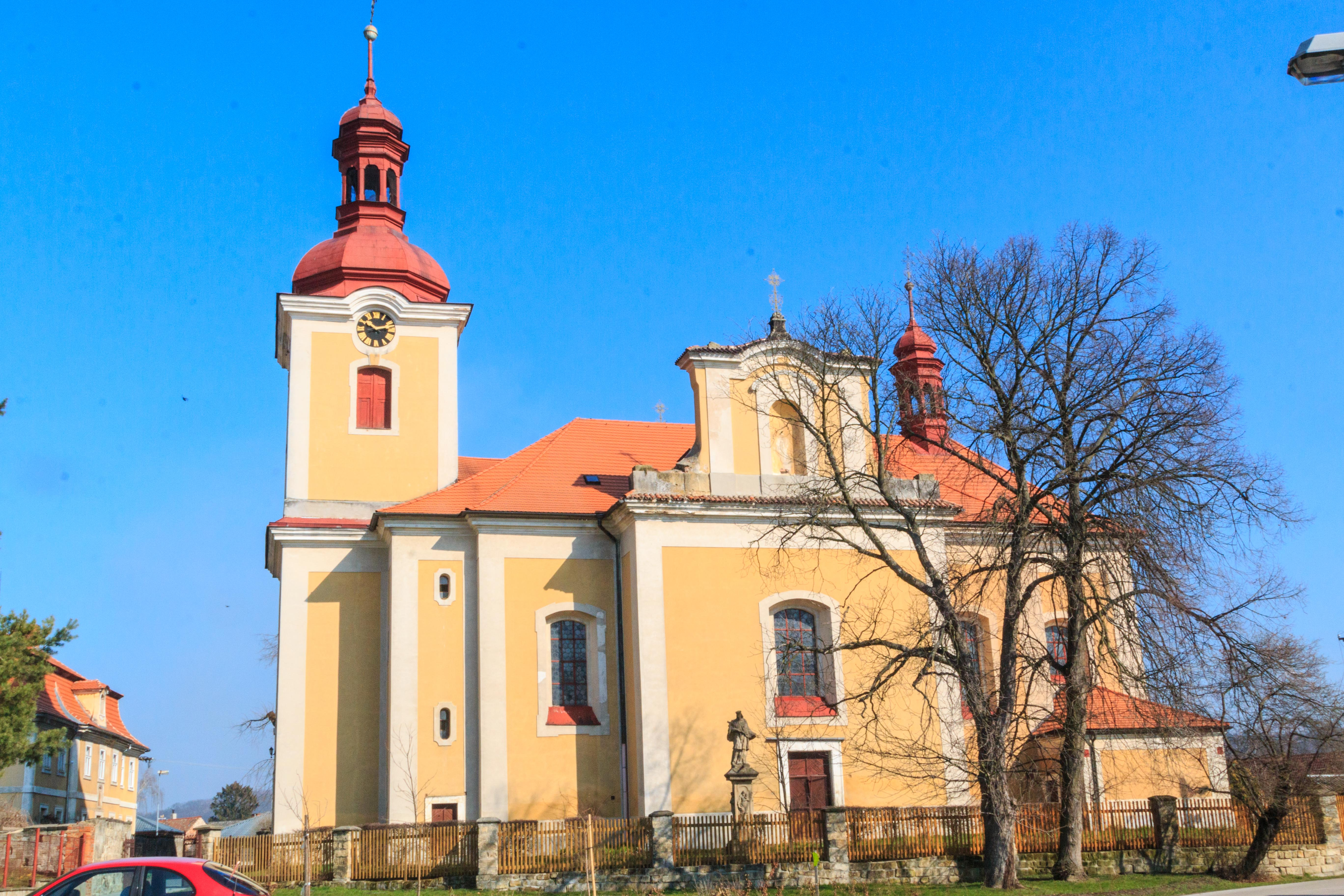
Church of the Holy Spirit

The main landmark of the town is the Church of the Holy Spirit. It is originally a Gothic church from the 14th century. It was rebuilt in the Baroque style in 1753–1756.

The Church of Saint George is located in Psinice. Originally a Gothic building, it was rebuilt to its present form in the Historicist style. A part of the stone wall that surrounds the church is a separate wooden bell tower.
