= Lviv Oblast =

Oblast (region) of Ukraine

Coordinates: 49°43′03″N 23°57′01″E

Lviv Oblast Львівська область
- Oblast
- Lvivska oblast
- Flag Coat of arms
- Nickname: Львівщина (Lvivshchyna)
- Country: Ukraine
- Administrative center: Lviv

Government
  - Governor: Maksym Kozytskyy
  - Oblast council: 84 seats
  - Chairperson: Yurii Kholod (acting)

Area
  - Total: 21,833 km^{2} (8,430 sq mi)
  - Rank: Ranked 17th
- Elevation: 296 m (971 ft)

Population (2022)
  - Total: 2,478,133
  - Density: 113.50/km^{2} (293.97/sq mi)

GDP
  - Total: ₴ 296 billion (€7.7 billion)
  - Per capita: ₴ 119,049 (€3,100)
- Time zone: UTC+2 (EET)
  - Summer (DST): UTC+3 (EEST)
- Postal code: 79-82
- Area code: +380-32
- ISO 3166 code: UA-46
- Raions: 7
- Hromadas: 73
- HDI (2022): 0.722 high
- FIPS 10-4: UP15
- NUTS statistical regions of Ukraine: UA73
- Website: www.loda.gov.ua

Lviv Oblast (Ukrainian: Львівська область, romanized: Lvivska oblast, IPA: [ˈlʲwiu̯sʲkɐ ˈɔblɐsʲtʲ]), also referred to as Lvivshchyna (Ukrainian: Львівщина, IPA: [ˈlʲwiu̯ʃtʃɪnɐ]), (Note: Most of Ukraine's oblasts are named after their capital cities, officially referred to as "oblast centers" (Ukrainian: обласни́й це́нтр, romanized: oblasnýi céntr, IPA: [oblɐsˈnɪj ˈtsɛntr]). The name of each oblast is a relational adjective—in English translating to a noun adjunct which otherwise serves the same function—formed by adding a feminine suffix to the name of the respective center city: Lʹvív is the center of the Lʹvívsʹka óblastʹ (Lviv Oblast). Most oblasts are also sometimes referred to in a feminine noun form, following the convention of traditional regional place names, ending with the suffix "-shchyna", as is the case with the Lviv Oblast, Lvivshchyna.) is an oblast in western Ukraine. The administrative center of the oblast is the city of Lviv. The current population is 2,478,133 (2022 estimate).

== History ==
=== Name ===
The region is named after the city of Lviv which was founded by Daniel of Galicia, the King of Galicia, in the 13th century, where it became the capital of Galicia-Volhynia. Daniel named the city after his son, Leo. During this time, the general region around Lviv was known as Galicia–Volhynia, one of the strongest and most stable kingdoms in Eastern Europe of that time.

=== Early history ===
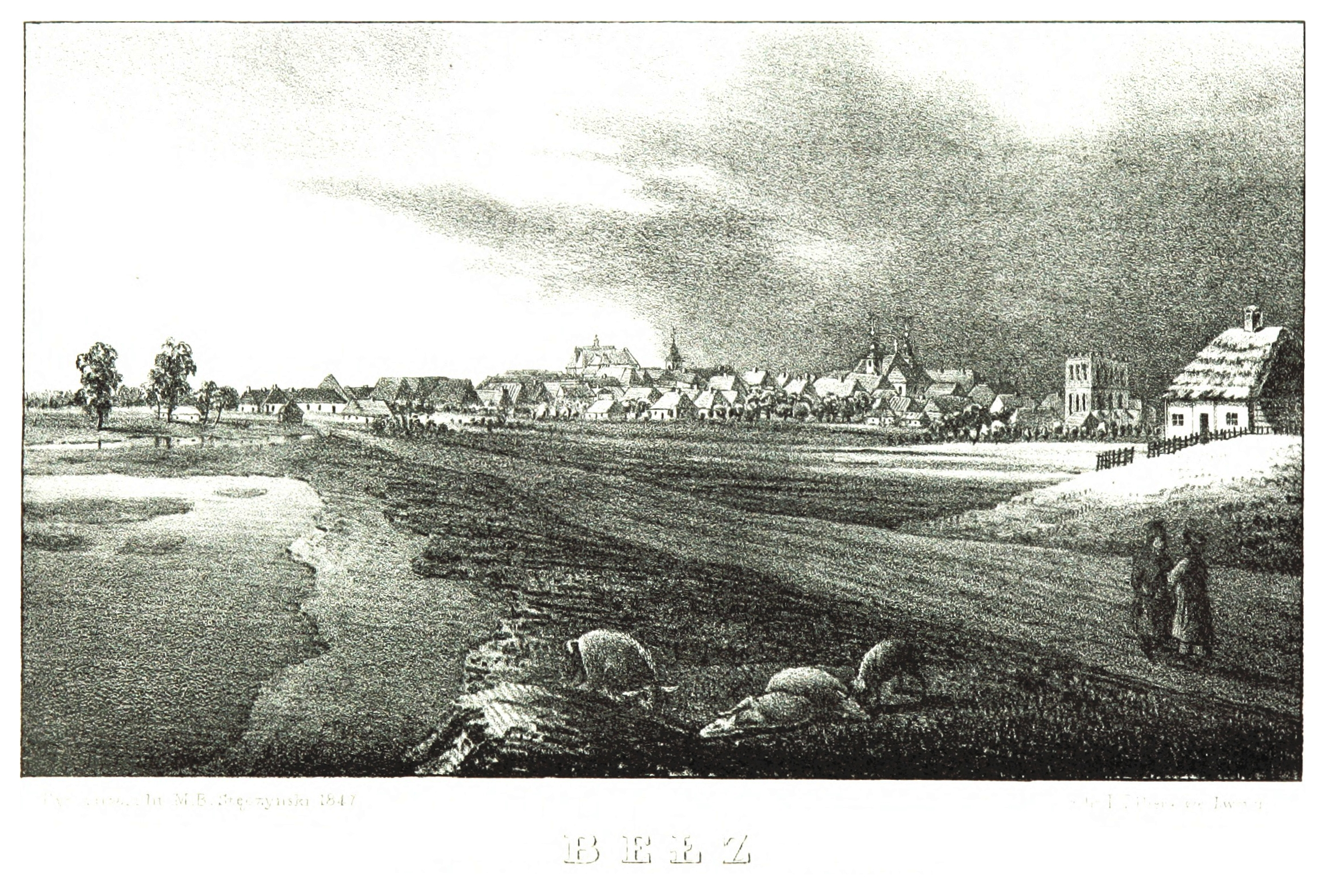
19th-century view of Belz, one of the oldest towns in the region

The oblast's strategic position at the heart of central Europe and as the gateway to the Carpathians has caused it to change hands many times over the centuries. In the Early Middle Ages, the territory was inhabited by the Lendians, an old Polish tribe. It was ruled variously by Great Moravia, Poland, Kievan Rus', the Kingdom of Galicia–Volhynia (circa 1200 to 1340; from 1246 under the suzerainty of the Golden Horde), and then ruled by the Kingdom of Poland and Polish–Lithuanian Commonwealth (1340 to 1772). Apart from the Polish and Ruthenian population, there were sizeable Scottish and Armenian communities in Lviv and Brody during Polish rule. Following the First Partition of Poland it passed to the Austro-Hungarian Empire (1772 to 1918), then the West Ukrainian People's Republic and Poland (1919 to 1939), when it was part of the Lwów Voivodeship of the Second Republic of Poland. The region's historically dominant Ukrainian population declared the area to be a part of an independent West Ukrainian People's Republic in November 1918 until June 1919, but this endured only briefly. Local autonomy was provided in international treaties but was ignored by the Polish government; the area experienced much ethnic tension between the Polish and Ukrainian populations.

=== Establishment ===
The oblast was created as part of the Ukrainian Soviet Socialist Republic on 4 December, 1939 following the Soviet invasion of eastern Poland and annexation of Eastern Galicia and Volhynia. Several NKVD prisoner massacres were committed in the area in 1941, including at Lviv, Sambir and Dobromyl.

It was occupied by Nazi Germany from 1941 to 1944 following the start of Operation Barbarossa, where most of the local Jewish population were killed. The Germans then established several prisoner-of-war camps with multiple forced labor subcamps in the region for Soviet, French and Belgian POWs, who were subjected to beatings, hunger, epidemics and executions, resulting in a high death rate. Following the end of World War II, the region remained in Soviet hands as was arranged in the Tehran and Yalta conferences. Most local Poles were expelled and Ukrainians expelled from Poland arrived.

As a result of the 1951 Polish–Soviet territorial exchange the area of Belz passed from Poland to the Lviv Oblast, whereas the area of Ustrzyki Dolne passed from the Drohobych Oblast to Poland. In 1959, Drohobych Oblast was incorporated into Lviv Oblast.

=== Present day ===
Given its historical development, Lviv Oblast is one of the least Russified and Sovietized parts of Ukraine, with much of its Polish and Habsburg heritage still visible today.

In Ukraine today, there are three provinces (oblasts) that formed the eastern part of the Kingdom of Galicia and Lodomeria. Two of these, Lviv Oblast and Ivano-Frankivsk Oblast were entirely contained in the kingdom; the third oblast of Ternopil was mainly in the kingdom apart from four of its most northerly counties (raions). The counties of the Kingdom of Galicia remained largely unchanged when they were incorporated into successor states; with minor changes as detailed below, the current counties are almost co-extensive with those of the Kingdom.

During the 2014 Euromaidan protests, the region is also notable for having declared independence from the central government led by Viktor Yanukovych who started to use active military force against protestors. During Ukraine's decommunization process that accelerated after 2014, Lviv Oblast became the first region of Ukraine to remove all its Soviet-era monuments by January 2024.

== Geography ==
The terrain of Lviv Oblast is highly varied. The southern part is occupied by the low Beskids mountain chains running parallel to each other from northwest to southeast and covered with secondary coniferous forests as part of the Eastern Carpathians; the highest point is Pikui (1408 m). North from there are the wide upper Dniester river valley and much smaller upper San River valley. These rivers have flat bottoms covered with alluvial deposits, and are susceptible to floods. Between these valleys and Beskyd lies the Precarpathian upland covered with deciduous forests, with well-known mineral spa resorts (see Truskavets, Morshyn). It's also the area of one of the earliest industrial petroleum and gas extraction. These deposits are all but depleted by now.

In the central part of the region lie Roztochchia, Opillia, and part of the Podolia uplands. Rich sulfur deposits were mined here during the Soviet era. Roztocze is densely forested, while Opillia and Podolia (being covered with loess on which fertile soils develop) are densely populated and mostly covered by arable land. In the central-north part of the region lies the Small Polesia lowland, geographically isolated from the rest of Polesia but with similar terrain and landscapes (flat plains with sandy fluvioglacial deposits and pine forests). The far North of the region lies on the Volhynia upland, which is also covered with loess; coal is mined in this area.

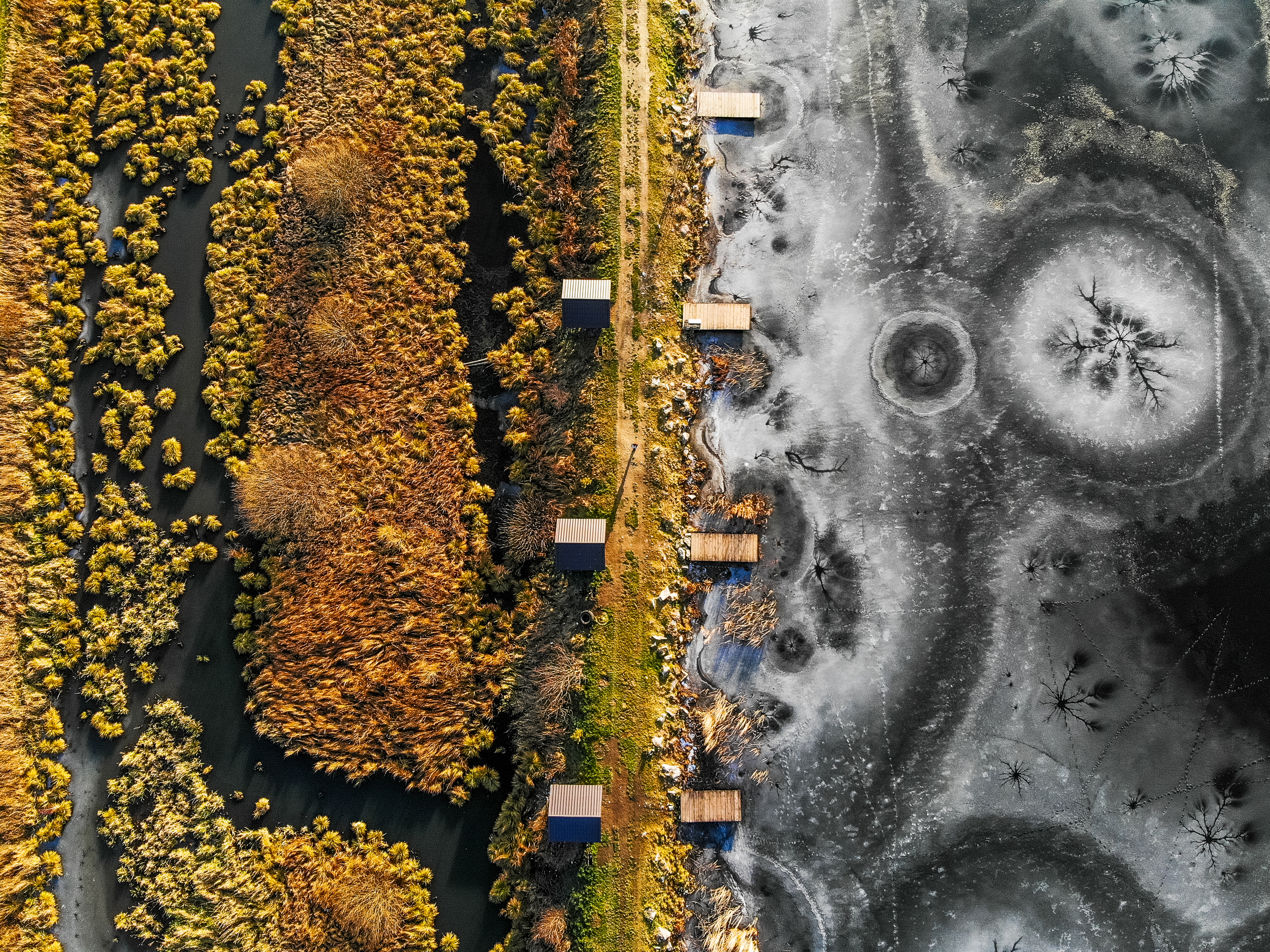
Roztochchia Biosphere Reserve

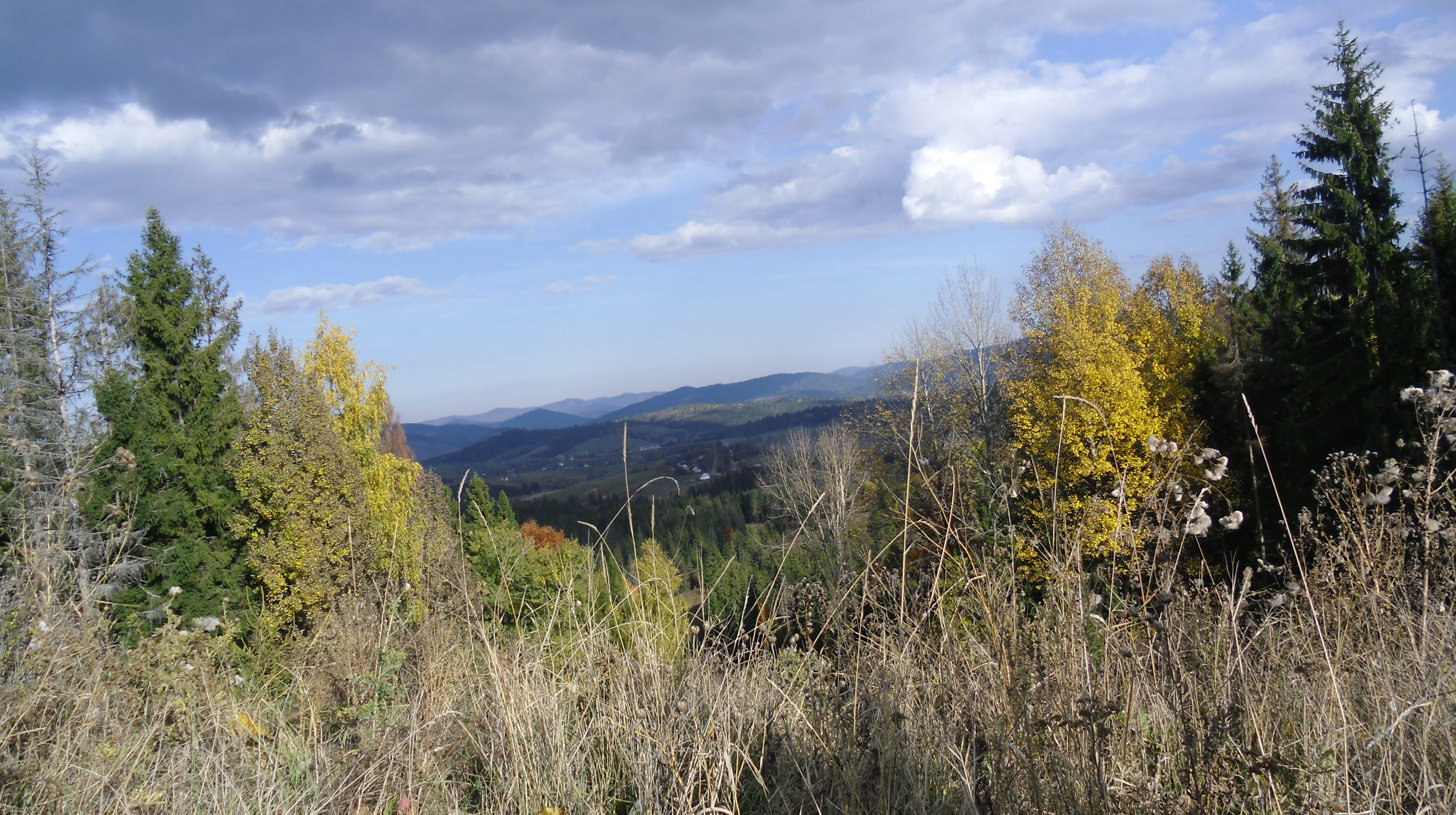
Skole Beskids. View of the village Tukholka.

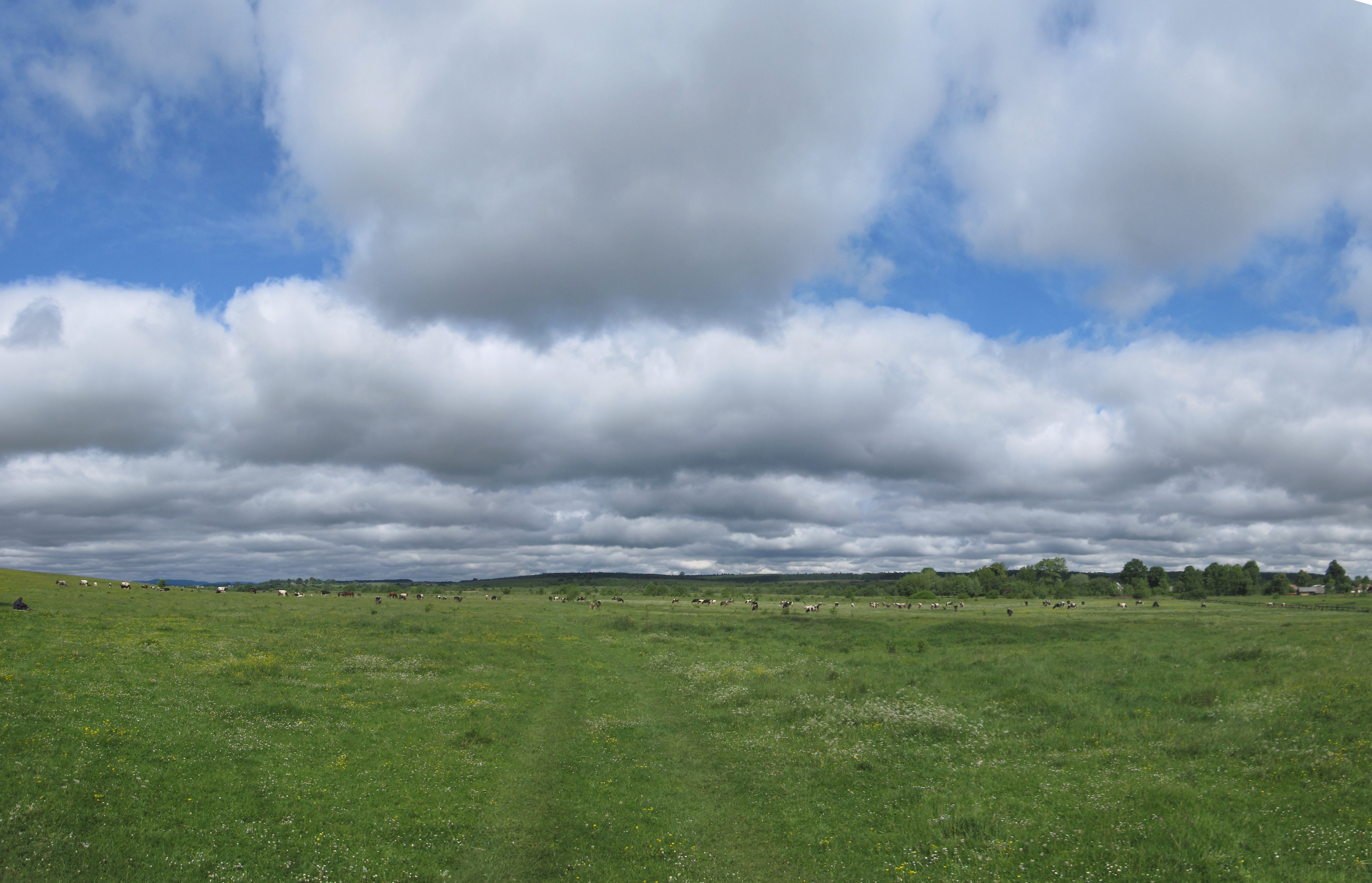
Grassy flatlands with rolling hills in the Drohobych Raion

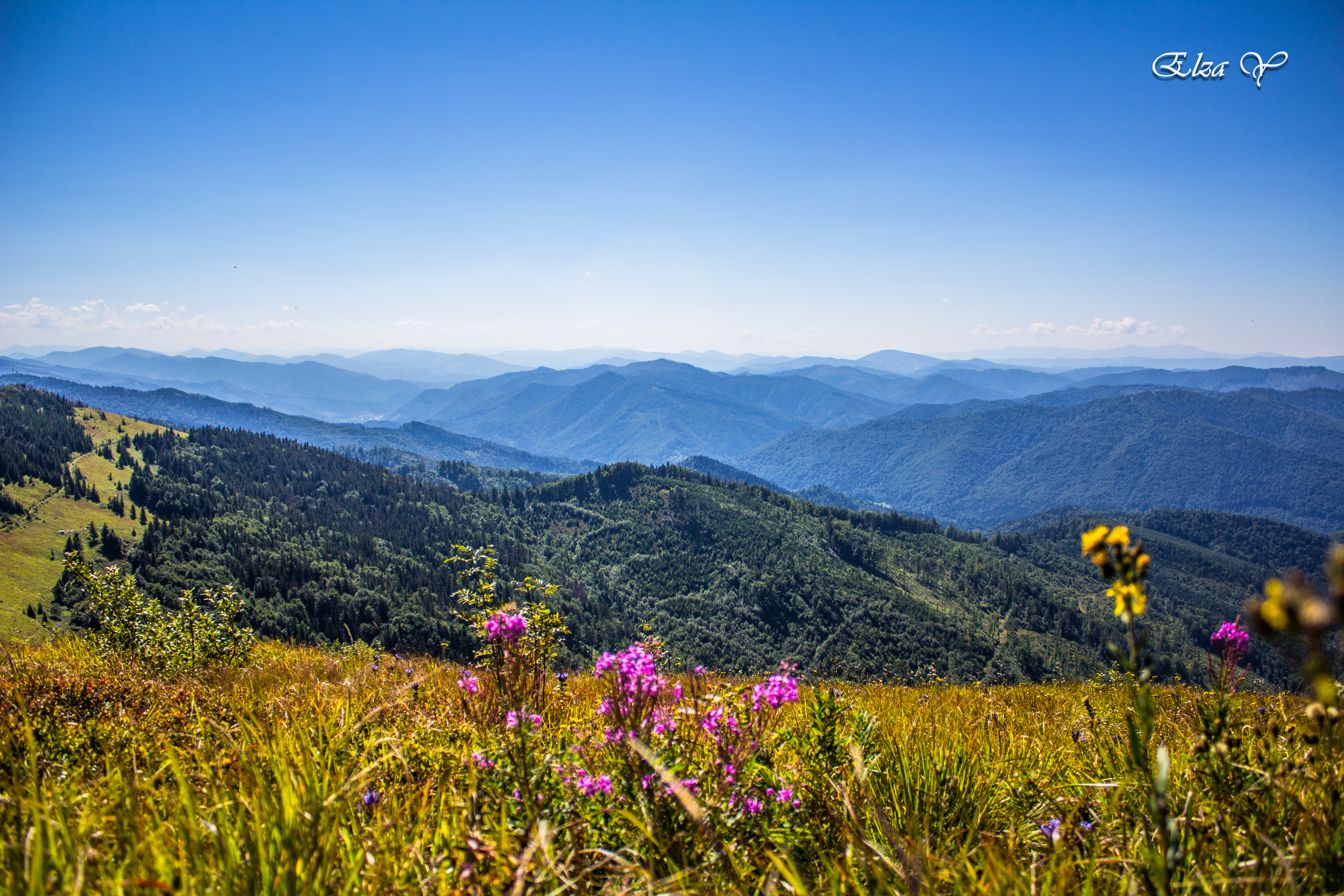
Mount Parashka, the highest peak of the Parashka Range in the Skole Beskids

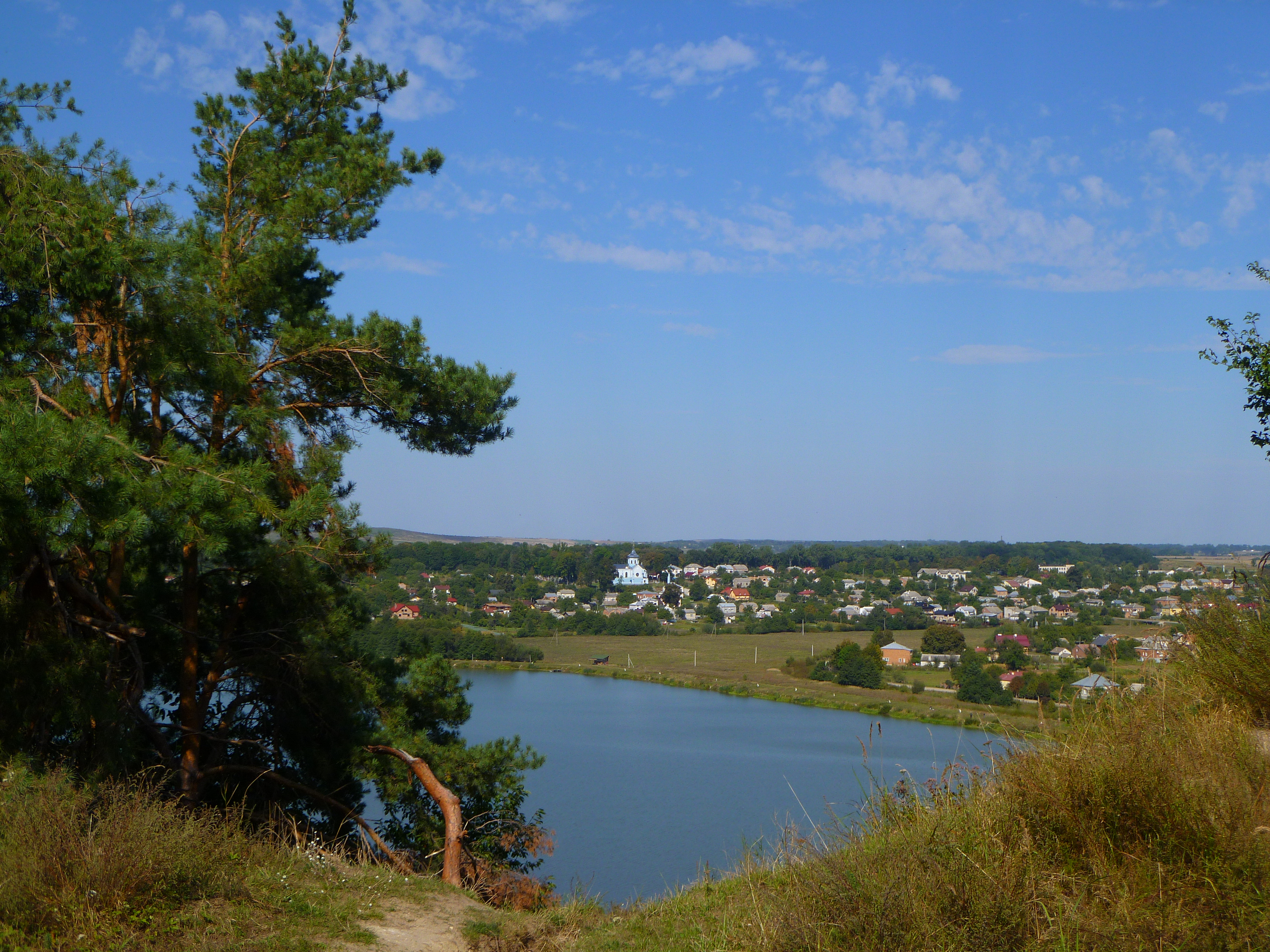
Zashkiv village in the former Lviv Raion

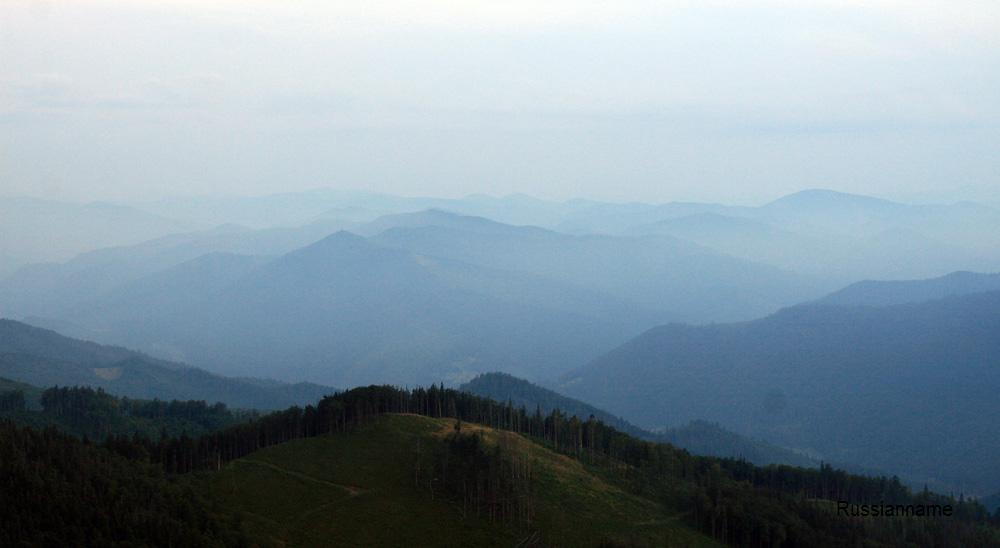
Ukrainian Carpathians within the Lviv Oblast

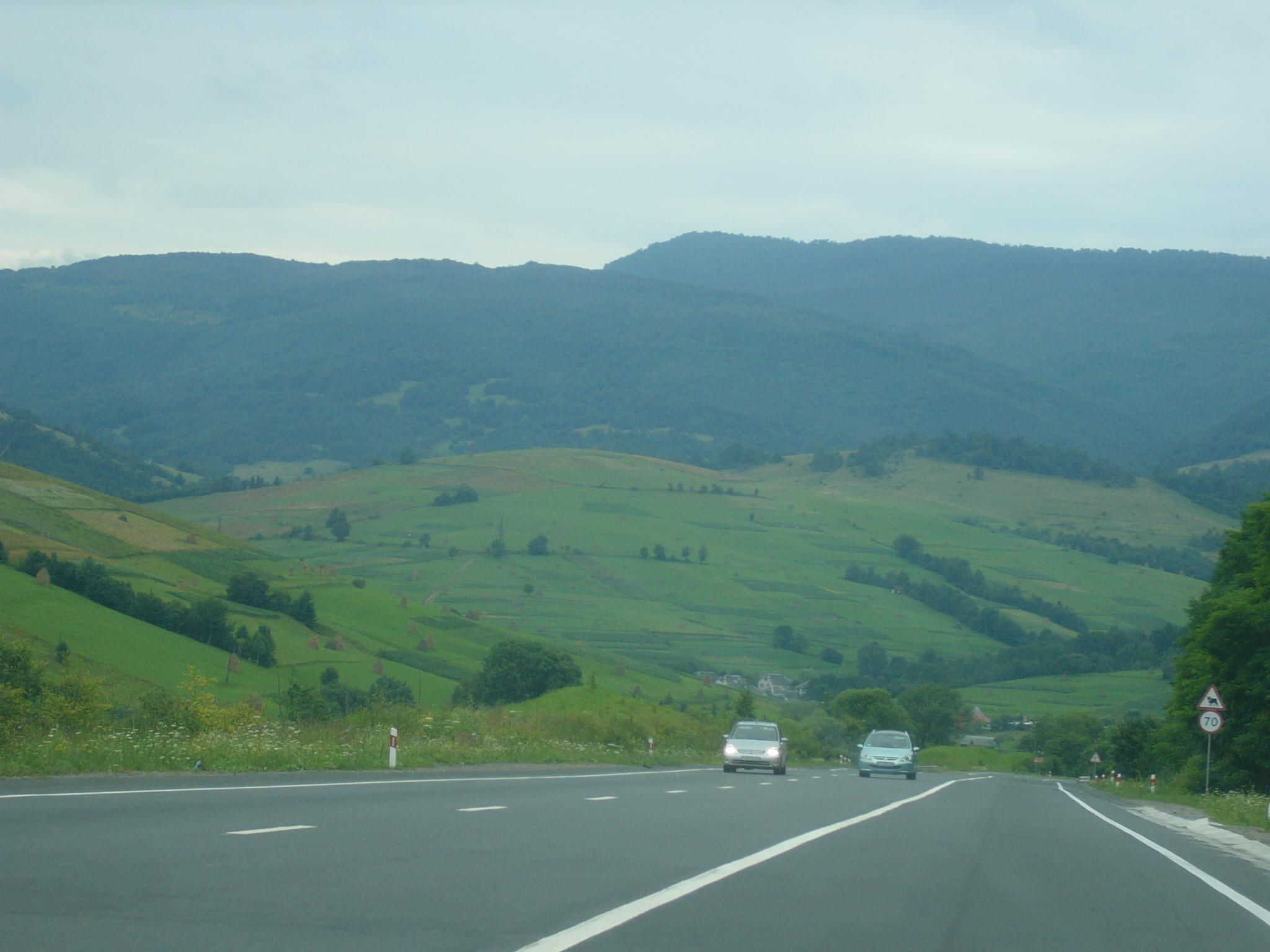
Motorway in Stryi Raion

== Climate ==
The climate of Lviv Oblast is moderately cool and humid. The average January temperatures range from −7 °C (19 °F) in the Carpathians to −3 °C (27 °F) in the Dniester and San River valleys while in July the average temperatures are from 14–15 °C (57–59 °F) in the Carpathians to 16–17 °C (61–63 °F) in Roztochchia and 19 °C (66 °F) in the lower part of the Dniester valley. The average annual precipitation is 600–650 mm (23.62–25.59 in) in the lowlands, 650–750 mm (25.59–29.53 in) in the highlands and up to 1,000 mm (39.37 in) in the Carpathians, with the majority of precipitation occurring in summer. Prolonged droughts are uncommon, while strong rainfalls can cause floods in river valleys. Severe winds during storms can also cause damage, especially in the highlands. The climate is suitable for the cultivation of sugar beets, winter wheat, flax, rye, cabbage, apples, and for dairy farming. It is still too cold to successfully cultivate maize, sunflower, grapes, melon, watermelon or peaches in Lviv Oblast. In the Carpathians conditions are suitable for seasonal Alpine skiing.

== Demographics ==
According to the 2001 Ukrainian census, ethnic Ukrainians accounted for 94.8% of the population of Lviv Oblast, ethnic Russians for 3.6%, and ethnic Poles for 0.7%. Notably, the comparison of the 2001 Ukrainian census (mentioned above), with the last Soviet census of 1989 reveals that in those 12 years the number of Poles in the Lviv Oblast declined by 29.7% which, in the opinion of "Wspólnota Polska" Society defies explanation, and could possibly be attributed to the intensive Ukrainization of the Roman Catholic Church.

=== Language ===
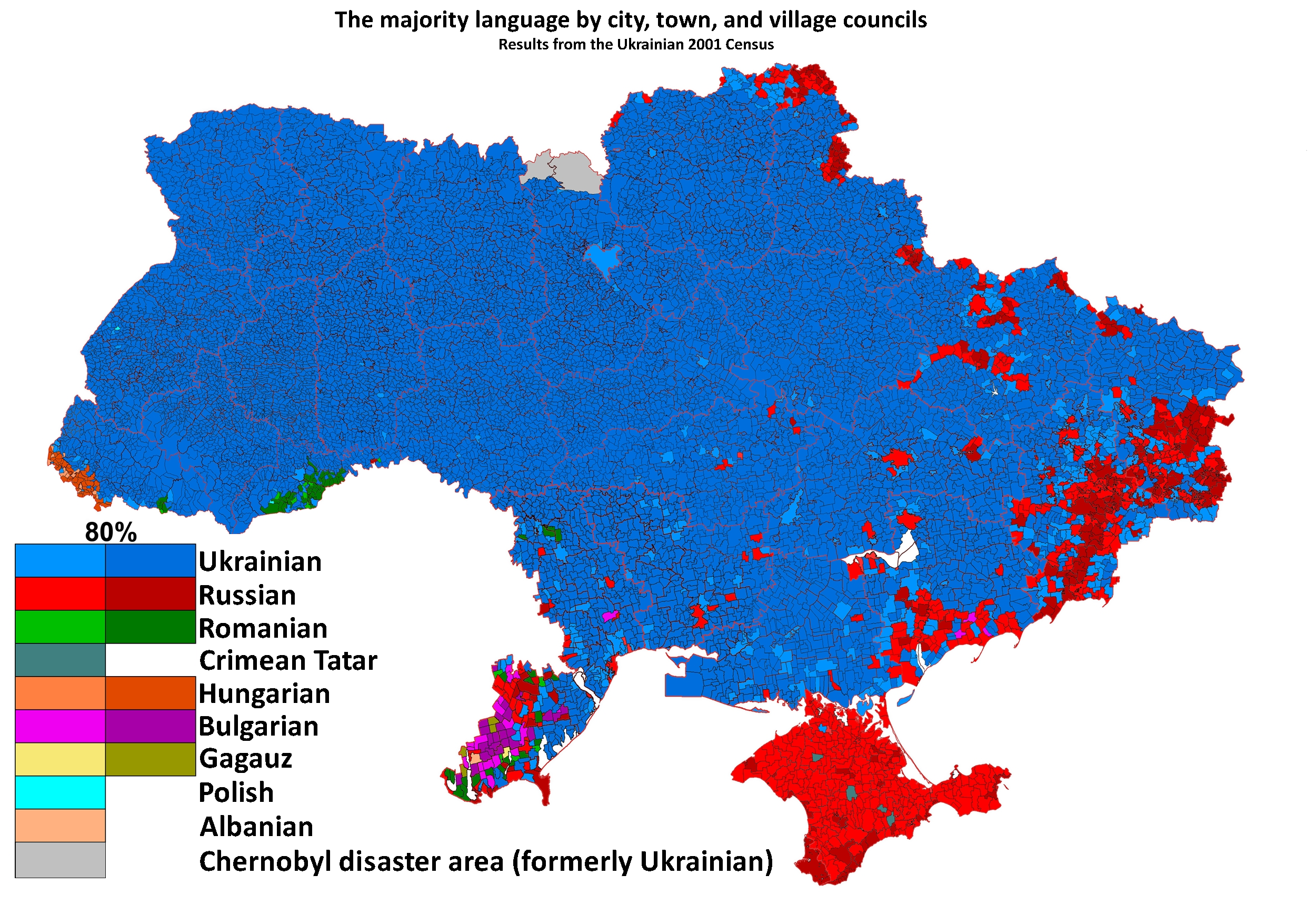
According to the 2001 Ukrainian census, Ukrainian was the native language for over 95% of Lviv Oblast's population: it was the dominant language in all of the city, town, and village councils of the oblast except one: Lypnyky, where Polish was the majority language.

Lviv Oblast was one of the few oblasts of the Ukrainian SSR where the share of Ukrainian speakers was increasing despite the Russification of Ukraine carried out in the USSR. Native language of the population of Lviv Oblast according to the results of population censuses:

| | 1959 | 1970 | 1979 | 1989 | 2001 |
|---|---|---|---|---|---|
| Ukrainian | 84.8% | 87.6% | 89.0% | 90.1% | 95.3% |
| Russian | 11.6% | 10.8% | 9.8% | 8.8% | 3.8% |
| Other | 3.6% | 1.6% | 1.2% | 1.1% | 0.6% |

Native language of the population of the raions, cities, and city councils of Lviv Oblast according to the 2001 Ukrainian census:

| | Ukrainian | Russian |
|---|---|---|
| Lviv Oblast | 95.3% | 3.8% |
| Lviv (city council) | 88.8% | 9.7% |
| Boryslav (city council) | 97.6% | 1.9% |
| Drohobych (city council) | 94.9% | 3.8% |
| Sheptytskyi (city council) | 93.3% | 6.2% |
| City of Sambir | 95.2% | 2.3% |
| City of Stryi | 93.0% | 5.1% |
| City of Truskavets | 94.2% | 5.0% |
| Brody Raion | 98.3% | 1.6% |
| Busk Raion | 99.4% | 0.5% |
| Horodok Raion | 99.1% | 0.8% |
| Drohobych Raion (in pre-2020 borders) | 99.6% | 0.3% |
| Zhydachiv Raion | 99.3% | 0.6% |
| Zhovkva Raion | 99.1% | 0.7% |
| Zolochiv Raion (in pre-2020 borders) | 99.0% | 0.9% |
| Kamianka-Buzka Raion | 98.8% | 1.0% |
| Mostyska Raion | 93.2% | 0.4% |
| Mykolaiv Raion | 98.5% | 1.4% |
| Peremyshliany Raion | 99.7% | 0.3% |
| Pustomyty Raion | 98.9% | 0.7% |
| Radekhiv Raion | 99.6% | 0.3% |
| Sambir Raion (in pre-2020 borders) | 98.0% | 0.6% |
| Skole Raion | 99.4% | 0.5% |
| Sokal Raion | 99.0% | 0.8% |
| Staryi Sambir Raion | 98.8% | 0.4% |
| Stryi Raion (in pre-2020 borders) | 99.3% | 0.6% |
| Turka Raion | 99.8% | 0.1% |
| Yavoriv Raion (in pre-2020 borders) | 98.9% | 1.0% |

Ukrainian is the only official language on the whole territory of Lviv Oblast.

On 18 September 2018, a moratorium on the public use of Russian-language cultural products was imposed in Lviv Oblast by a decision of the Lviv Oblast Council.

According to a poll conducted by Rating from 16 November to 10 December 2018 as part of the project «Portraits of Regions», 90% of the residents of Lviv Oblast believed that the Ukrainian language should be the only state language on the entire territory of Ukraine. 7% believed that Ukrainian should be the only state language, while Russian should be the second official language in some regions of the country. 1% believed that Russian should become the second state language of the country. 2% found it difficult to answer.

On 20 September 2022, Lviv Oblast Council approved the «Comprehensive Programme for Strengthening of the Ukrainian Language for 2023—2026», the main objectives of which are to strengthen the positions of the Ukrainian language in various spheres of public life in the oblast and to Ukrainianize the refugees from other regions of Ukraine.

According to the research of the Content Analysis Centre, conducted from 15 August to 15 September 2024, the topic of which was the ratio of Ukrainian and Russian languages in the Ukrainian segment of social media, 93.9% of posts from Lviv Oblast were written in Ukrainian (87.3% in 2023, 86.0% in 2022, 52.4% in 2020), while 6.1% were written in Russian (12.7% in 2023, 14.0% in 2022, 47.6% in 2020).

After Ukraine declared independence in 1991, Lviv Oblast, as well as Ukraine as a whole, experienced a gradual Ukrainization of the education system, which had been Russified during the Soviet era. Dynamics of the ratio of the languages of instruction in general secondary education institutions in Lviv Oblast:

| Language of instruction, % of pupils | 1991— 1992 | 1992— 1993 | 1993— 1994 | 1994— 1995 | 1995— 1996 | 2000— 2001 | 2005— 2006 | 2007— 2008 | 2010— 2011 | 2012— 2013 | 2015— 2016 | 2018— 2019 | 2021— 2022 | 2022— 2023 |
| Ukrainian | 91.8% | 93.6% | 94.6% | 95.4% | 96.0% | 98.0% | 99.0% | 99.0% | 99.0% | 99.0% | 99.0% | 99.0% | 99.65% | 99.64% |
| Russian | 8.1% | 6.2% | 5.3% | 4.4% | 4.0% | 2.0% | 1.0% | 1.0% | 1.0% | 1.0% | 1.0% | 1.0% | 0.07% | — |

According to the State Statistics Service of Ukraine, in the 2023–2024 school year, of the 286,111 pupils in general secondary education institutions in Lviv Oblast, 285,367 (99.74%) were studying in classes where Ukrainian was the language of instruction, while 744 (0.26%) were studying in classes where Polish was the language of instruction.

=== Age structure ===
0-14 years: 15.7% ▲ (male 202,923/female 193,000)
15-64 years: 70.0% ▼ (male 867,699/female 897,788)
65 years and over: 14.3% (male 122,906/female 238,016) (2013 official)

=== Median age ===
total: 38.0 years ▲
male: 35.2 years ▲
female: 40.9 years ▲ (2013 official)

== Politics ==
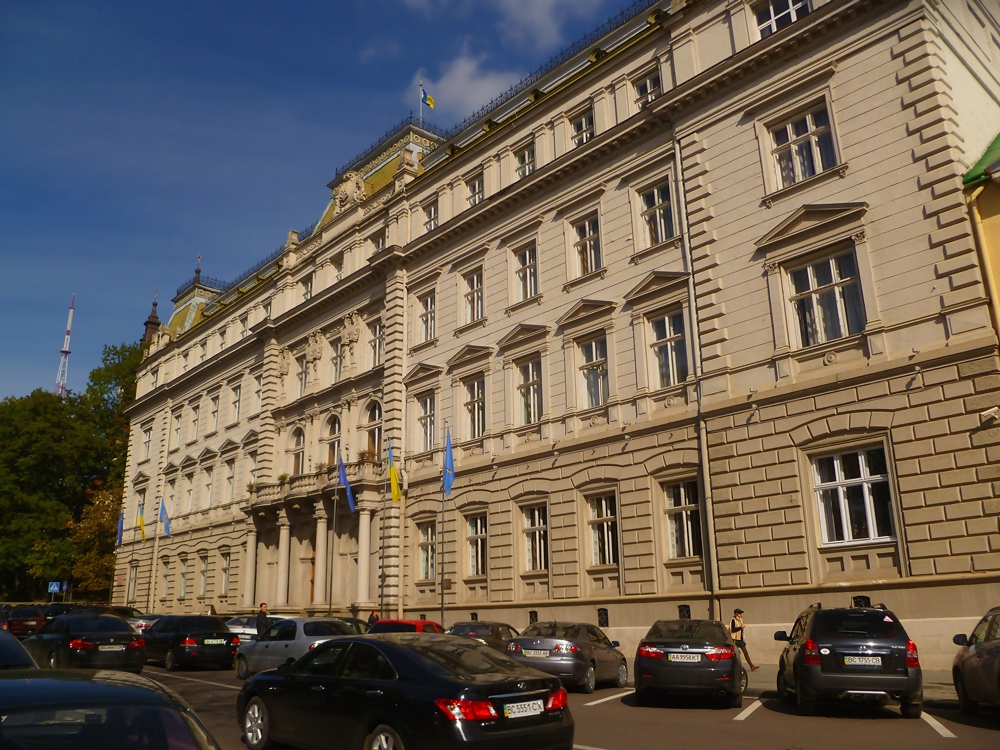
Government House, Lviv

=== Governors ===
- Chairmen of the Executive Committee

| Term start | Term end | Name | Year of birth | Year of death |
|---|---|---|---|---|
| March 1991 | 6 April 1992 | Vyacheslav Chornovil | b. 1937 | d. 1999 |
| June 1994 | July 1995 | Mykola Horyn | b. 1945 | |

- Representative of the President

| Term start | Term end | Name | Year of birth |
|---|---|---|---|
| 20 March 1992 | June 1994 | Stepan Davymuka | b. 1947 |

- Heads of the Administration

| Term start | Term end | Name | Year of birth | Year of death |
|---|---|---|---|---|
| 7 July 1995 | 6 Feb. 1997 | Mykola Horyn | b. 1945 | |
| 6 Feb. 1997 | 14 Jan. 1999 | Mykhailo Hladiy | b. 1952 | |
| 15 Jan. 1999 | 19 March 2001 | Stepan Senchuk | b. 1955 | d. 2005 |
| 26 March 2001 | 26 April 2002 | Mykhailo Hladiy | b. 1952 | |
| 26 April 2002 | 4 June 2003 | Myron Yankiv | b. 1951 | |
| 9 June 2003 | 20 Dec. 2004 | Oleksandr Sendeha | b. 1953 | |
| 20 Dec. 2004 | 4 Feb. 2005 | Bohdan Matolych (acting) | b. 1955 | |
| 4 Feb. 2005 | 20 Feb. 2008 | Petro Oliynyk | b. 1957 | d. 2011 |
| 20 Feb. 2008 | 27 Feb. 2008 | Valery Pyatak (acting) | b. 1959 | |
| 27 Feb. 2008 | 20 April 2010? | Mykola Kmit (acting to 1 Sep 2008) | b. 1966 | |
| 20 April 2010 | 21 December 2010 | Vasyl Horbal | b. 1971 | |
| 21 December 2010 | 2 November 2011 | Mykhailo Tsymbaliuk | b. 1964 | |
| 2 November 2011 | 4 March 2013 | Mykhailo Kostiuk | b. 1961 | |
| 4 March 2013 | 31 October 2013 | Viktor Shemchuk | b. 1970 | |
| 31 October 2013 | 23 January 2014 | Oleh Salo | b. 1968 | |
| 2 March 2014 | 14 August 2014 | Iryna Sekh | b. 1970 | |
| 14 August 2014 | 26 December 2014 | Yuriy Turyanskyi (acting) | b. 1975 | |
| 26 December 2014 | 11 June 2019 | Oleh Synyutka | b. 1970 | |
| 11 June 2019 | 5 July 2019 | Rostyslav Zamlynsky (acting) | b. 1976 | |
| 5 July 2019 | 5 February 2020 | Markiyan Malsky | b. 1984 | |
| 5 February 2020 | | Maksym Kozytsky | b. 1981 | |

== Subdivisions ==
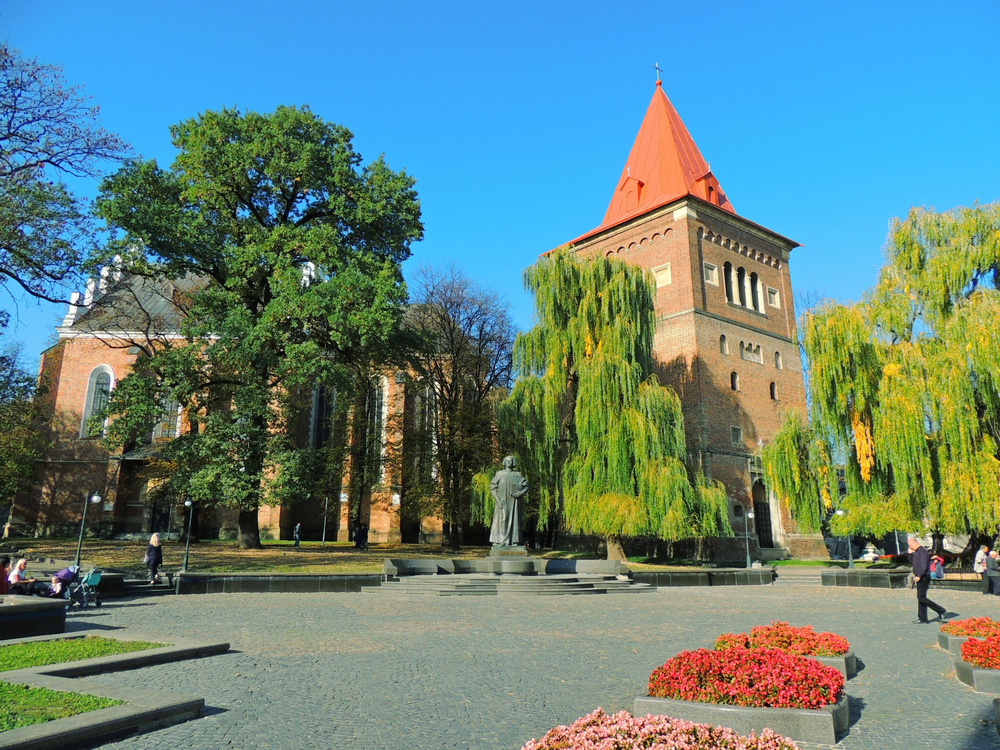
Drohobych, the second largest city in Lviv Oblast

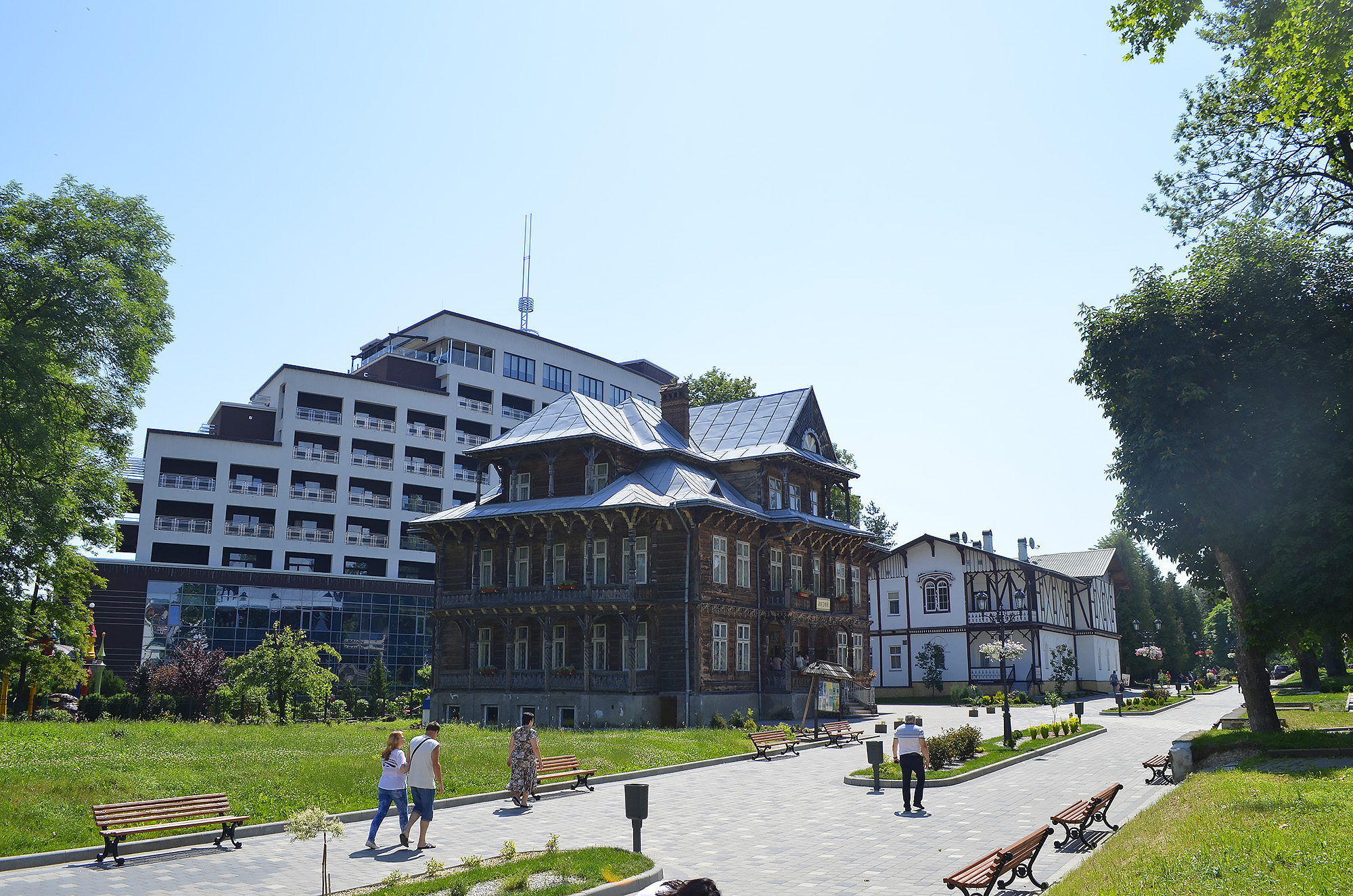
Truskavets, a small resort town in the Carpathian foothills.

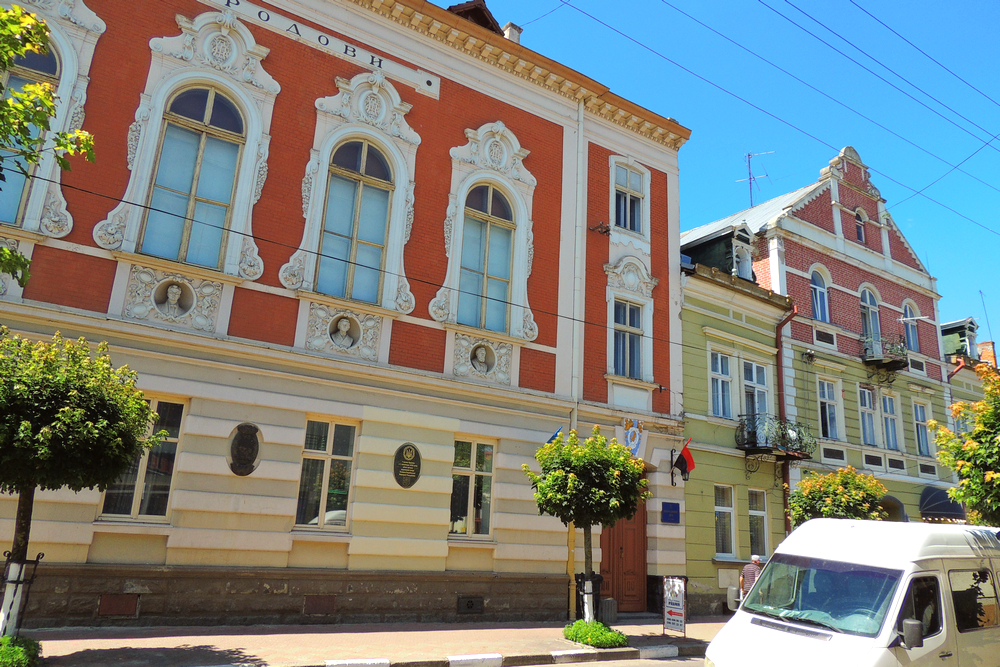
Architecture in Stryi

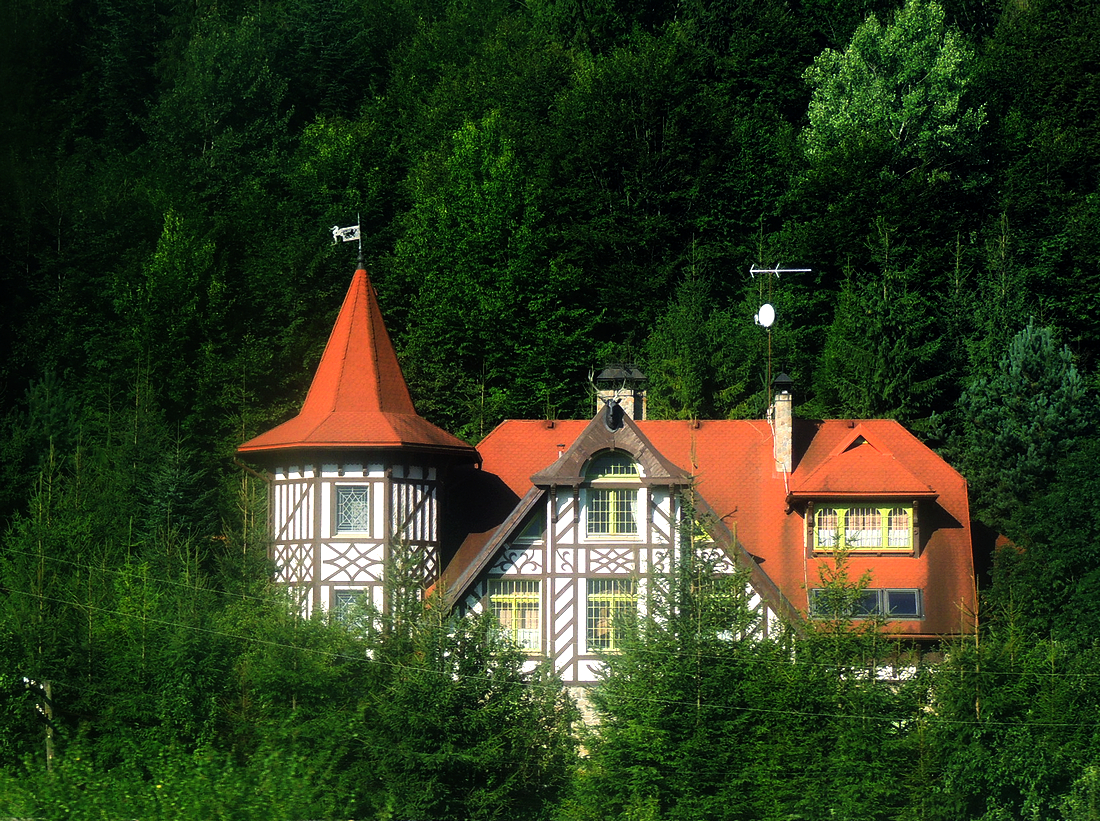
Half-timbered old villa in the Carpathian foothills in Stryi Raion

Lviv Oblast
As of January 1, 2022
| Number of districts (райони) | 7 |
| Number of hromadas (громади) | 73 |

Until the big district reform on July 18, 2020, Lviv Oblast was administratively subdivided into 20 raions (districts), as well as 9 city (municipalities) which are directly subordinate to the oblast government: Boryslav, Sheptytskyi, Drohobych, Morshyn, Novyi Rozdil, Sambir, Stryi, Truskavets, and the administrative center of the oblast, Lviv.

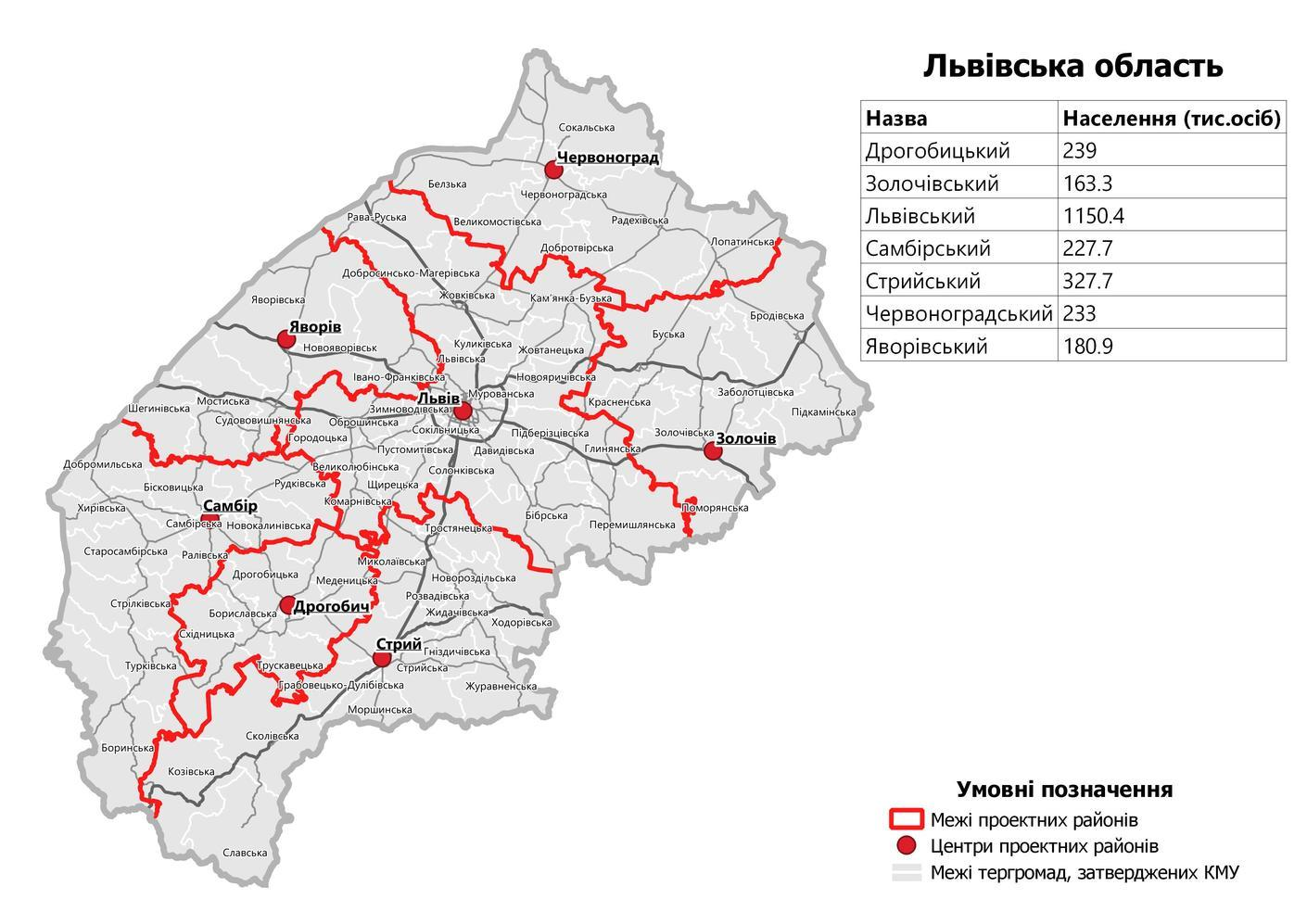
Raions of Lviv Oblast as of August 2020

On 18 July 2020, the number of districts was reduced to seven. These are:

1. Drohobych Raion (Дрогобицький район), the center is in the city of Drohobych;
2. Lviv Raion (Львівський район), the center is in the city of Lviv;
3. Sambir Raion (Самбірський район), the center is in the city of Sambir;
4. Sheptytskyi Raion (Шептицький район), the center is in the city of Sheptytsky;
5. Stryi Raion (Стрийський район), the center is in the city of Stryi;
6. Yavoriv Raion (Яворівський район), the center is in the city of Yavoriv;
7. Zolochiv Raion (Золочівський район), the center is in the city of Zolochiv.

In addition, there are the city raions of the city of Lviv.

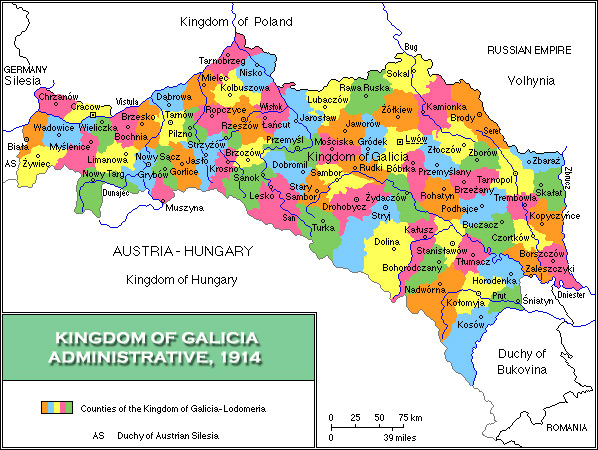
Kingdom of Galicia, administrative, 1914

Raions of the Lviv Oblast (pre-2020 reform)
| In English | In Ukrainian | Administrative Center |
|---|---|---|
| Brody Raion | Бродівський район Brodivskyi raion | Brody (City) |
| Busk Raion | Буський район Buskyi raion | Busk (City) |
| Drohobych Raion | Дрогобицький район Drohobytskyi raion | Drohobych (City) |
| Horodok Raion | Городоцький район Horodotskyi raion | Horodok (City) |
| Kamianka-Buzka Raion | Кам'янка-Бузький район Kamianka-Buzkyi raion | Kamianka-Buzka (City) |
| Mostyska Raion | Мостиський район Mostyskyi raion | Mostyska (City) |
| Mykolaiv Raion | Миколаївський район Mykolaivskyi raion | Mykolaiv (City) |
| Peremyshliany Raion | Перемишлянський район Peremyshlianskyi raion | Peremyshliany (City) |
| Pustomyty Raion | Пустомитівський район Pustomytivskyi raion | Pustomyty (City) |
| Radekhiv Raion | Радехівський район Radekhivskyi raion | Radekhiv (City) |
| Sambir Raion | Самбірський район Sambirskyi raion | Sambir (City) |
| Skole Raion | Сколівський район Skolivskyi raion | Skole (City) |
| Sokal Raion | Сокальський район Sokalskyi raion | Sokal (City) |
| Staryi Sambir Raion | Старосамбірський район Starosambirskyi raion | Staryi Sambir (City) |
| Stryi Raion | Стрийський район Stryiskyi raion | Stryi (City) |
| Turka Raion | Турківський район Turkivskyi raion | Turka (City) |
| Yavoriv Raion | Яворівський район Yavorivskyi raion | Yavoriv (City) |
| Zhovkva Raion | Жовківський район Zhovkivskyi raion | Zhovkva (City) |
| Zhydachiv Raion | Жидачівський район Zhydachivskyi raion | Zhydachiv (City) |
| Zolochiv Raion | Золочівський район Zolochivskyi raion | Zolochiv (City) |

== Religion ==
Fifty-nine percent of the religious organisations active in the Lviv Oblast adhere to the Ukrainian Greek Catholic Church. The Ukrainian Autocephalous Orthodox Church is the second largest religious body. The followers of the Latin Church and the Ukrainian Orthodox Church (Moscow Patriarchate) are mostly from the Polish, and Russian or non-Galician Ukrainian minorities respectively.

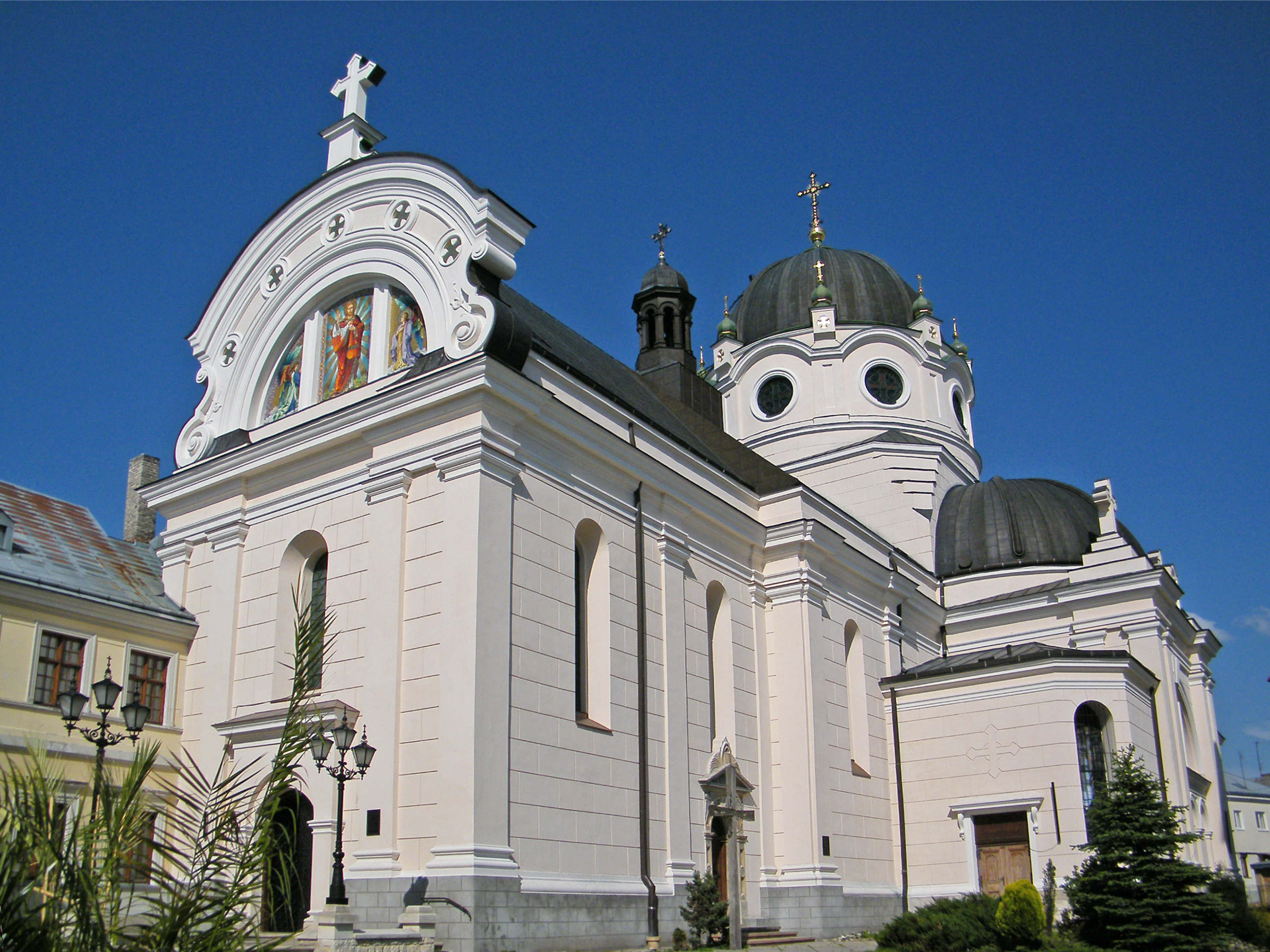
Zhovkva. Temple of the Sacred Heart of Jesus

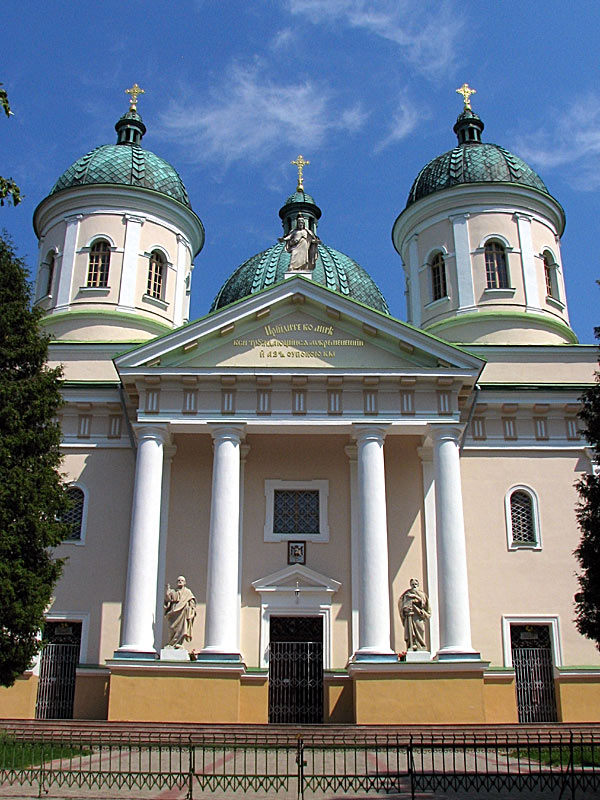
Church of Sts. Peter & Paul in Sokal

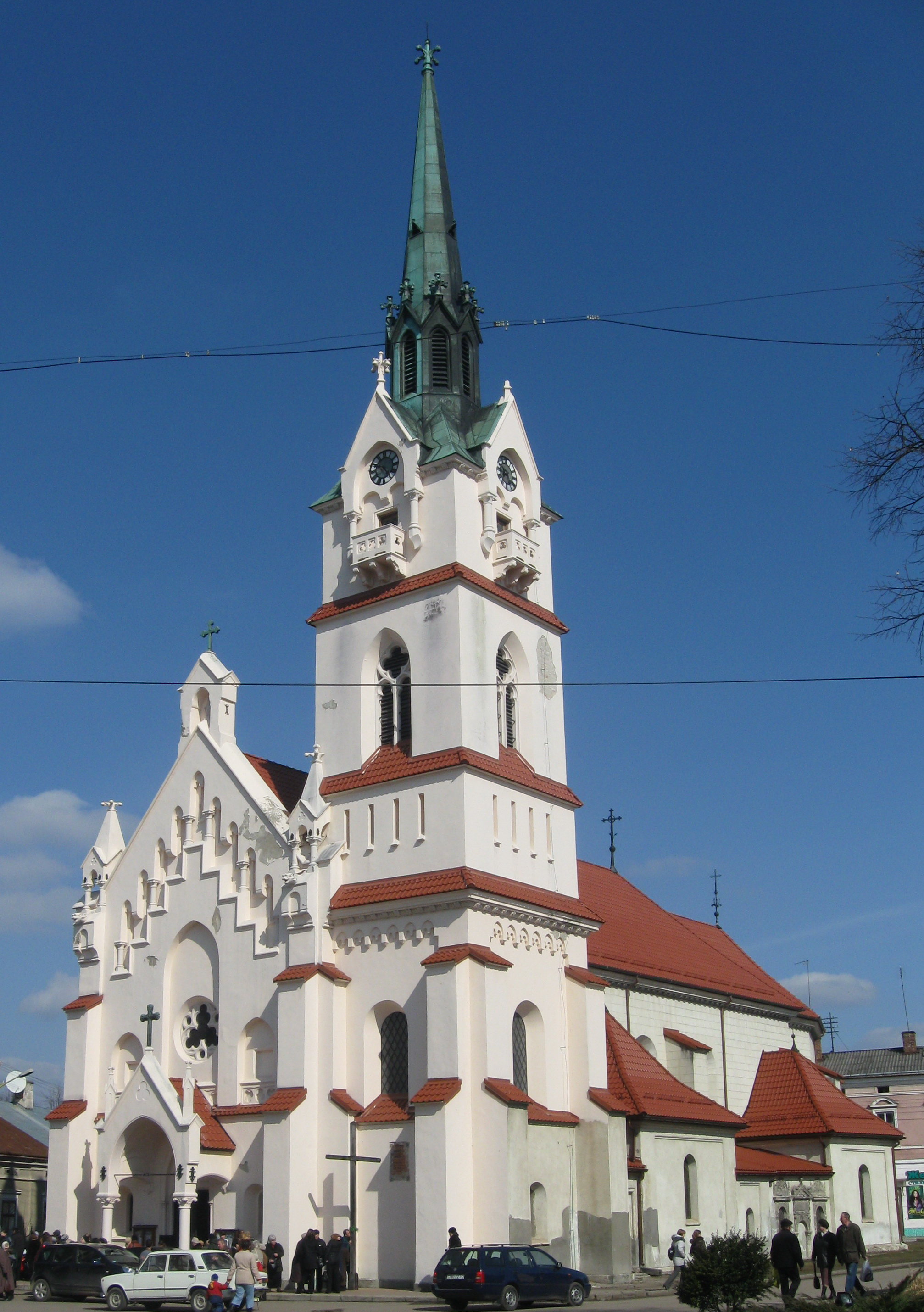
Church of Our Lady Protectress in Stryi

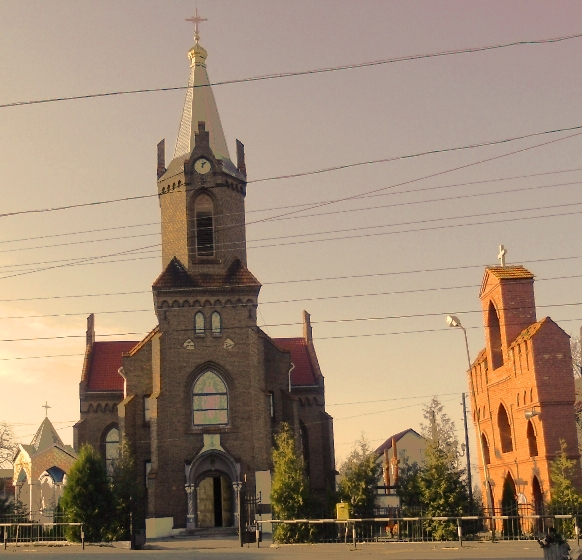
Church of St. Anna in Boryslav

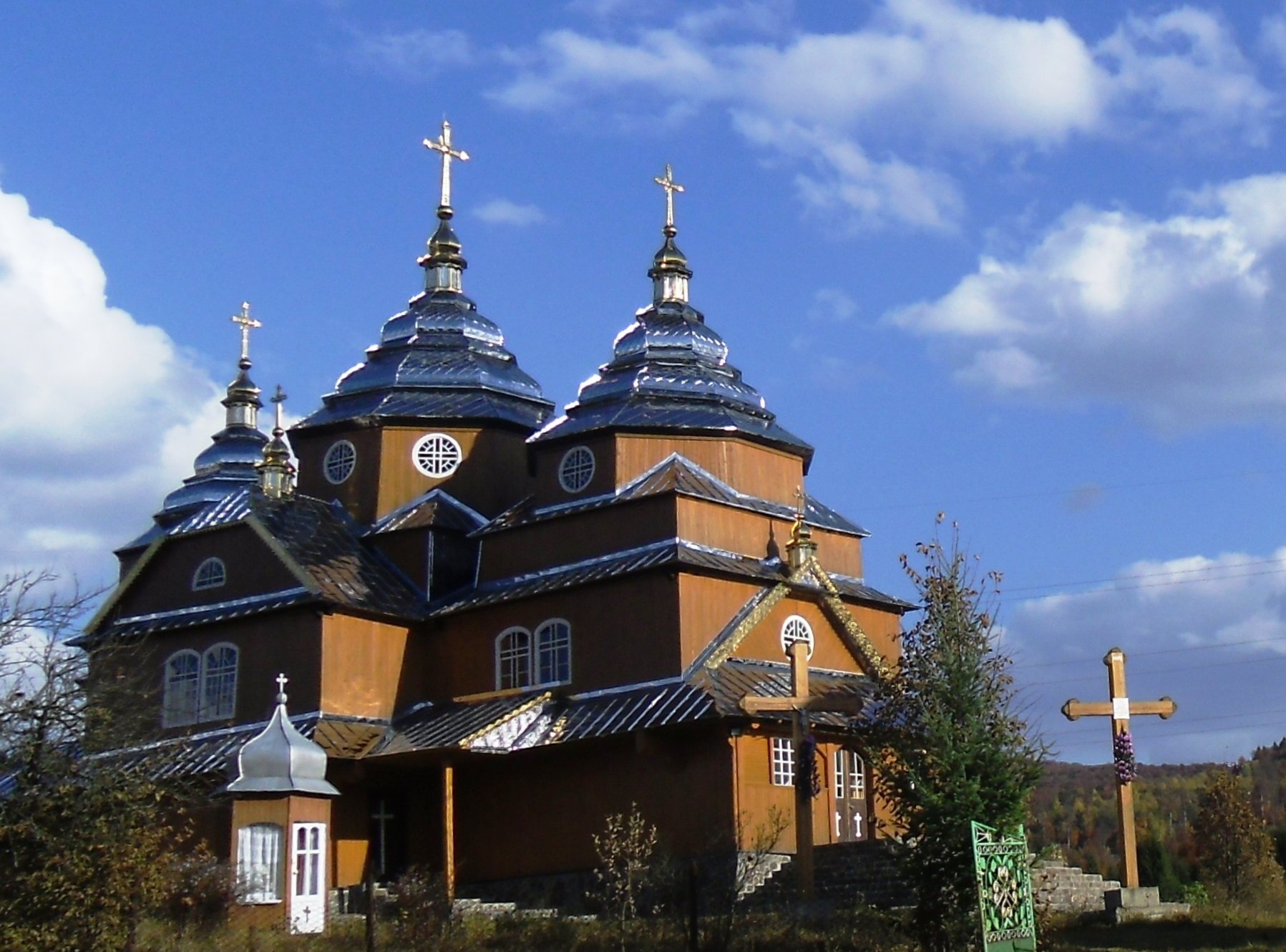
Church of the Blessed Eucharist, Klymets, Stryi Raion

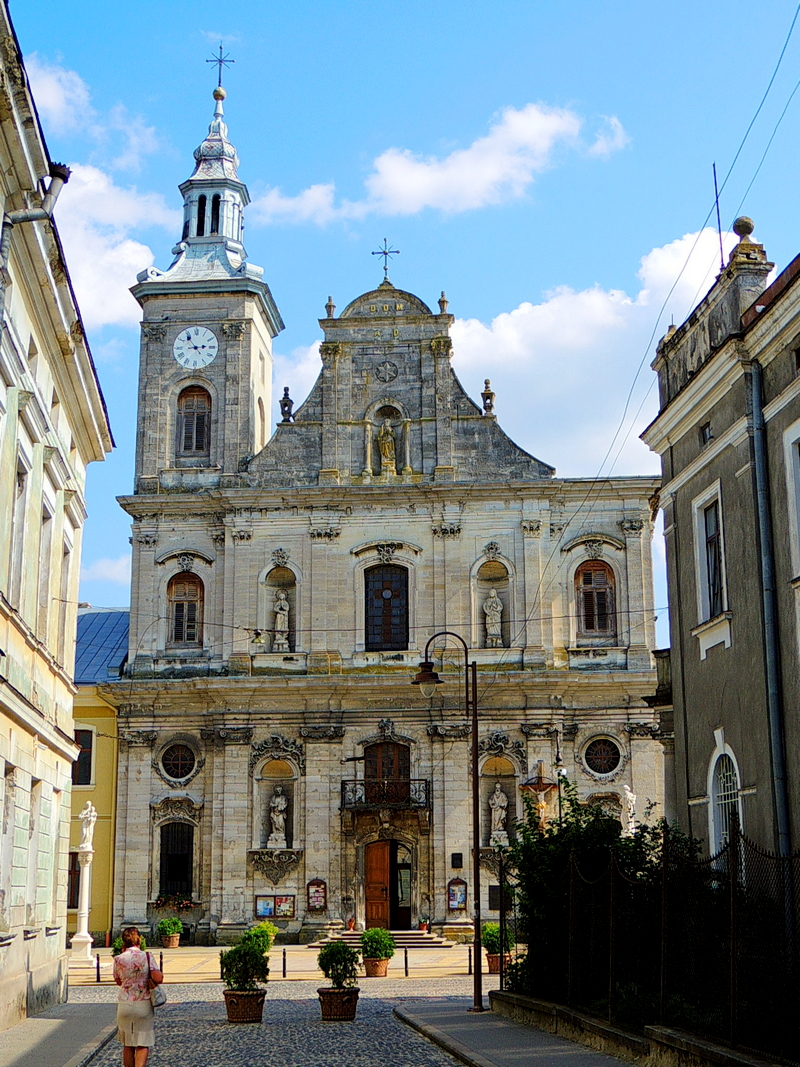
Church of Assumption of the Holy Virgin (1731–1763) in Zolochiv

== Historical and cultural sites ==
The city of Lviv contains a well-preserved main square (Rynok) and numerous historical churches. Other sites of interest are the historic Lychakiv Cemetery, the local museum of folklore, and the ruins of the famous Vysokyi Zamok. The name of the castle is closely tied to the name of the city. There is also a museum of military artifacts, the "Arsenal".

Well-preserved local wooden churches, castles, and monasteries can be found throughout the Oblast. One of them is the Olesko Castle which is first recorded in 1327. Another castle that was built at the end of the 15th century is Svirzh Castle in the village of Svirzh. One more and no less famous castle is the Pidhirtsi Castle. Its architectural complex consists of the three-story palace, Kostel, and small park. In Roztochia is also located the Krekhivsky monastery in the beech-pine grove at the foot of the Pobiina mount. The whole complex consists of the Saint Nicholas Church, the bell tower, numerous service structures, and defensive walls with towers. Another site worth of mentioning is the Tustan city-fortress which is built in the rock. The site was nominated as the historical and as the natural wonder of Ukraine. There also a nature complex in the valley of the Kamianka river in Stryi Raion. Another natural wonder of the region is the Kamin-Veleten (Rock-Giant in English) which is located near city of Pidkamin in Zolochiv Raion. The name of the local city means Under the Rock. A local museum of Ukrainian art and an institution of higher learning (Ivan Franko State University) are also present.

=== Gallery ===
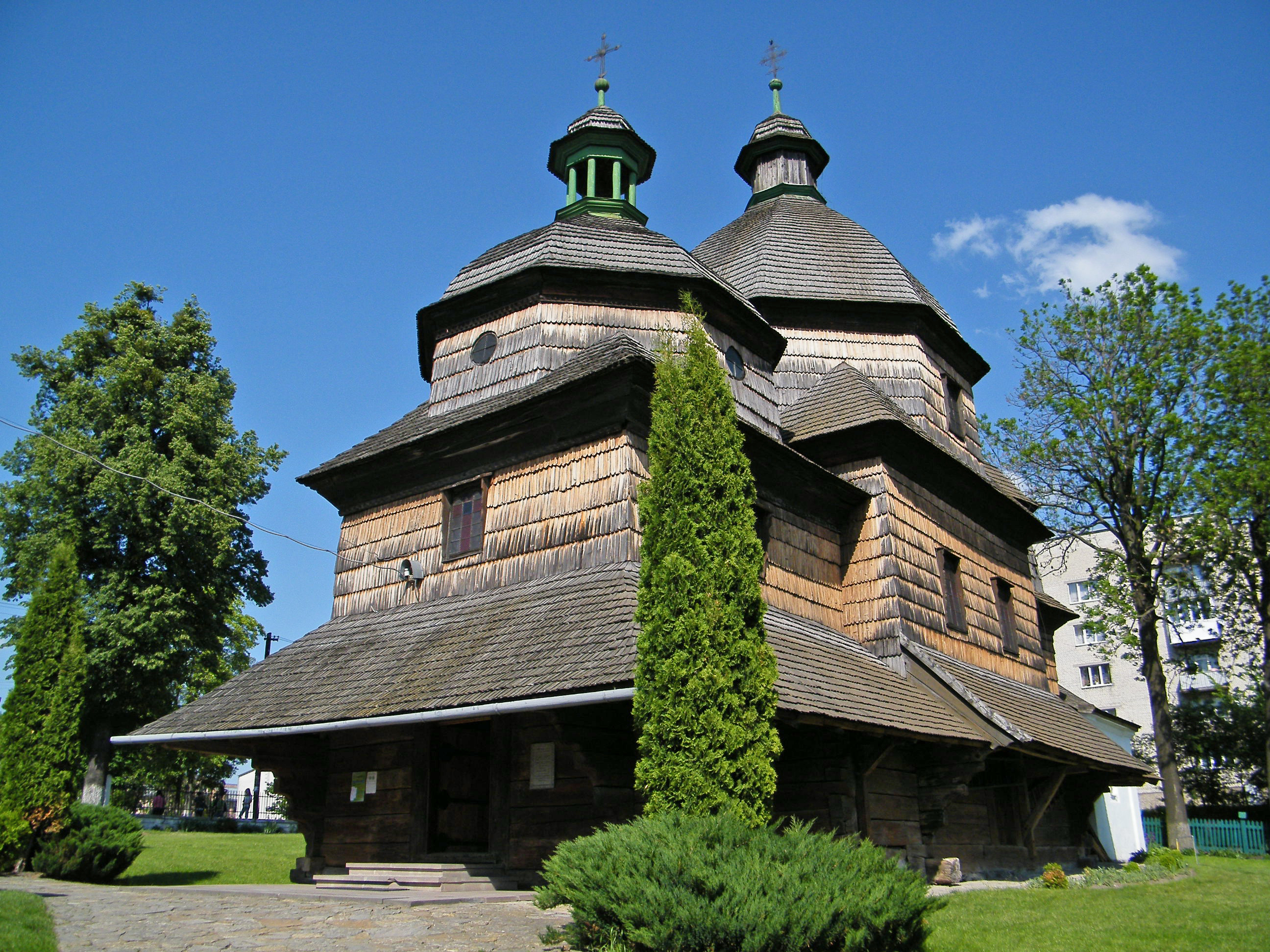
Trinity Church in Zhovkva

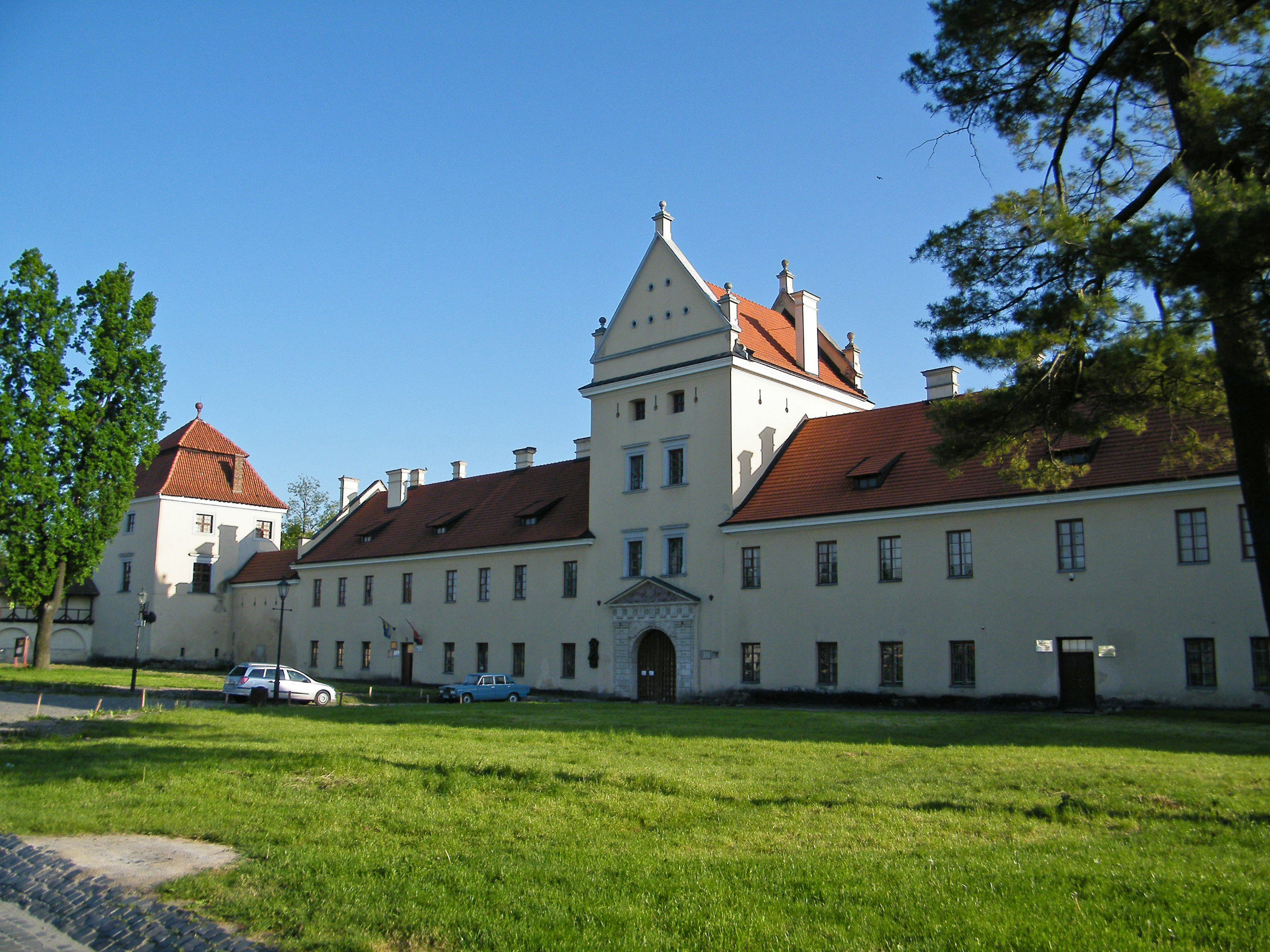
Zhovkva Castle

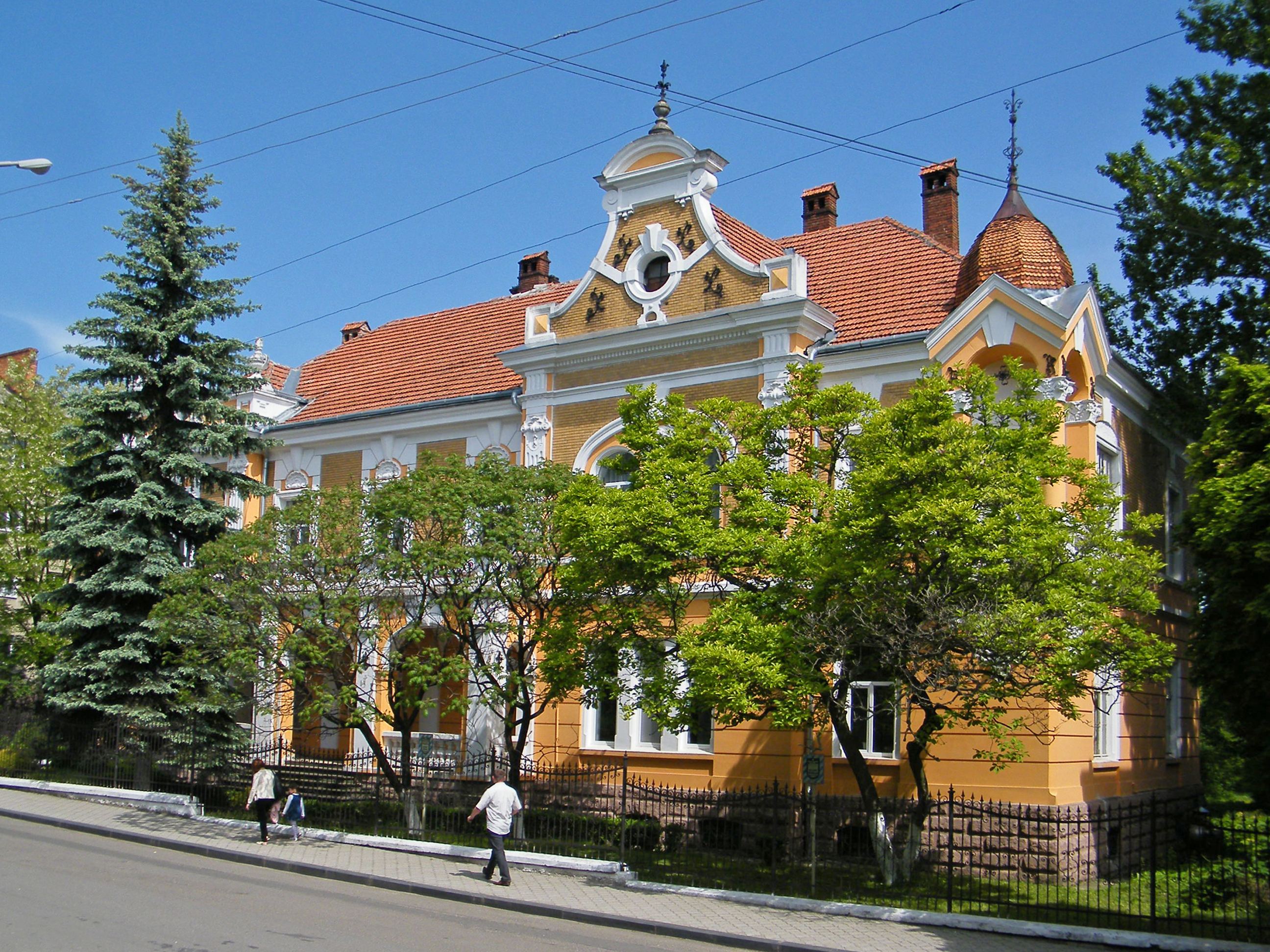
Villa in Drohobych

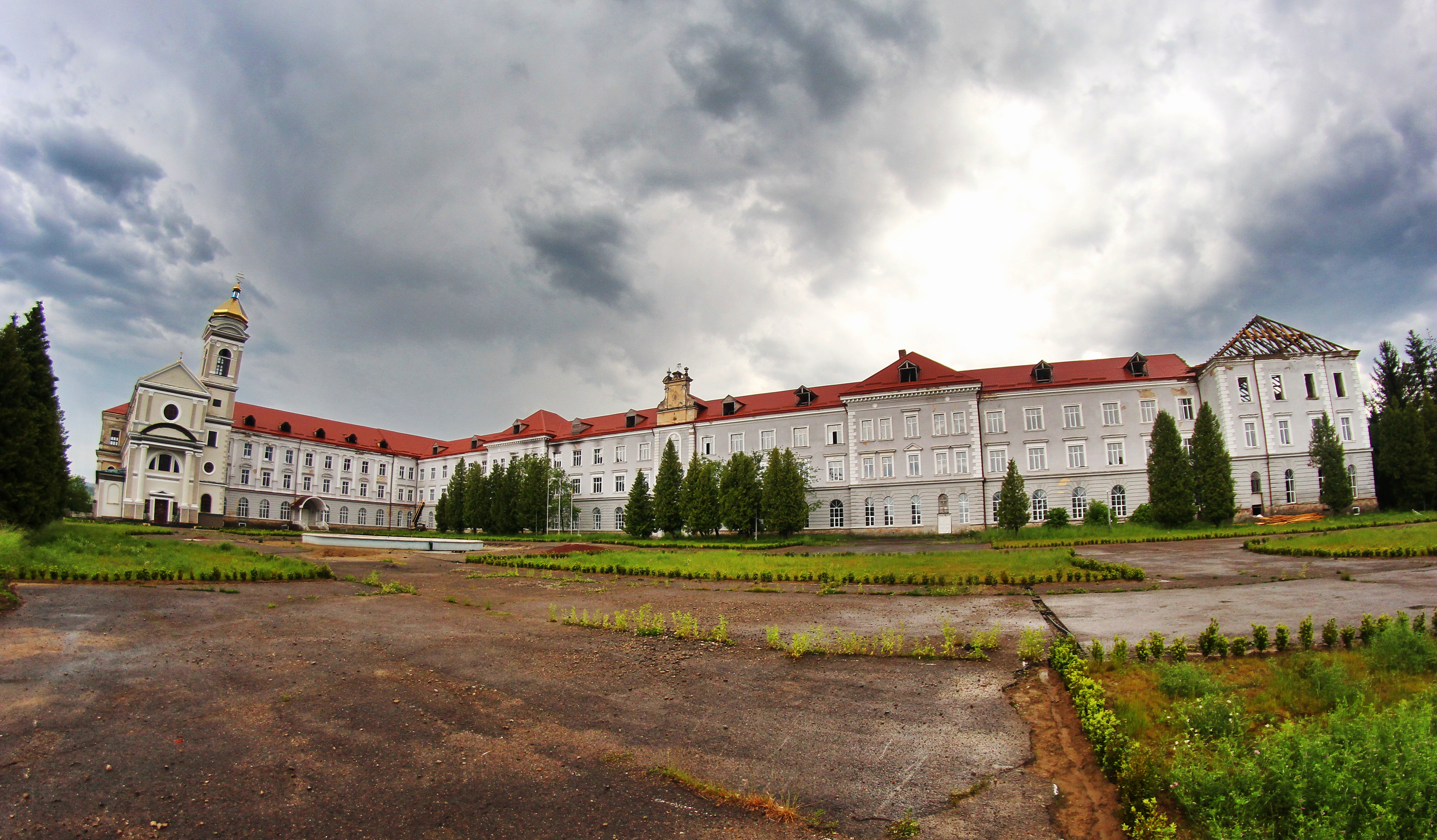
Former college of Jesuits in Khyriv

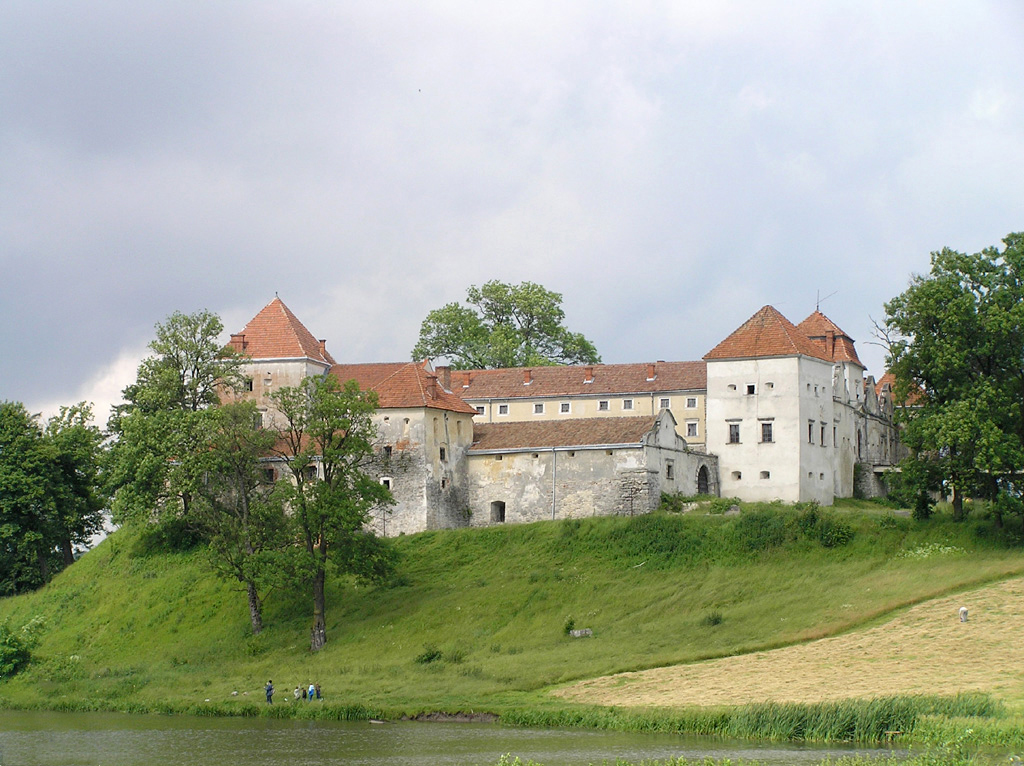
Svirzh Castle

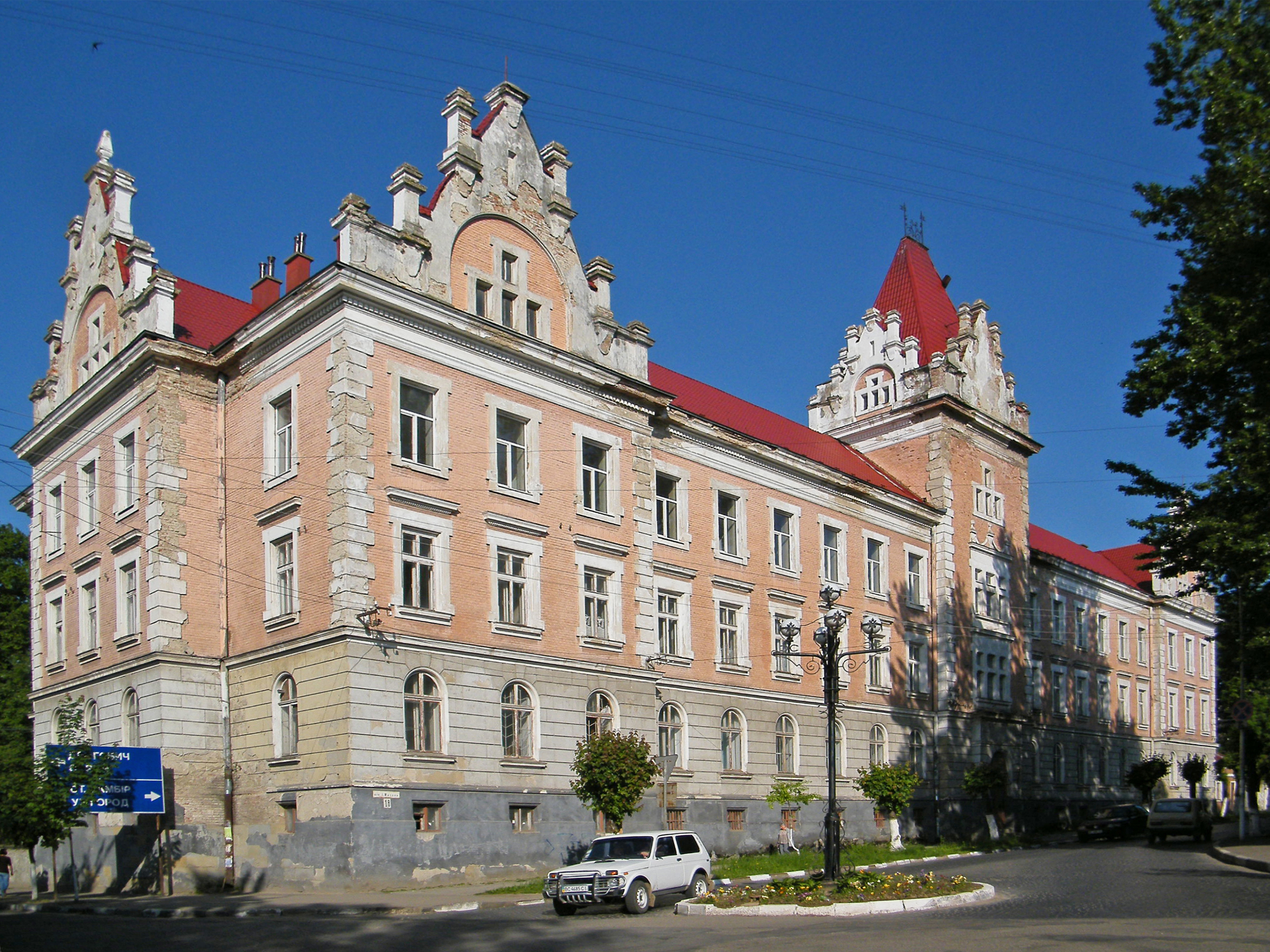
Former Treasury building in Sambir

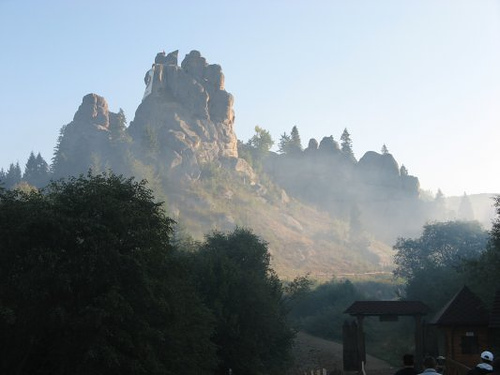
Morning in Tustan

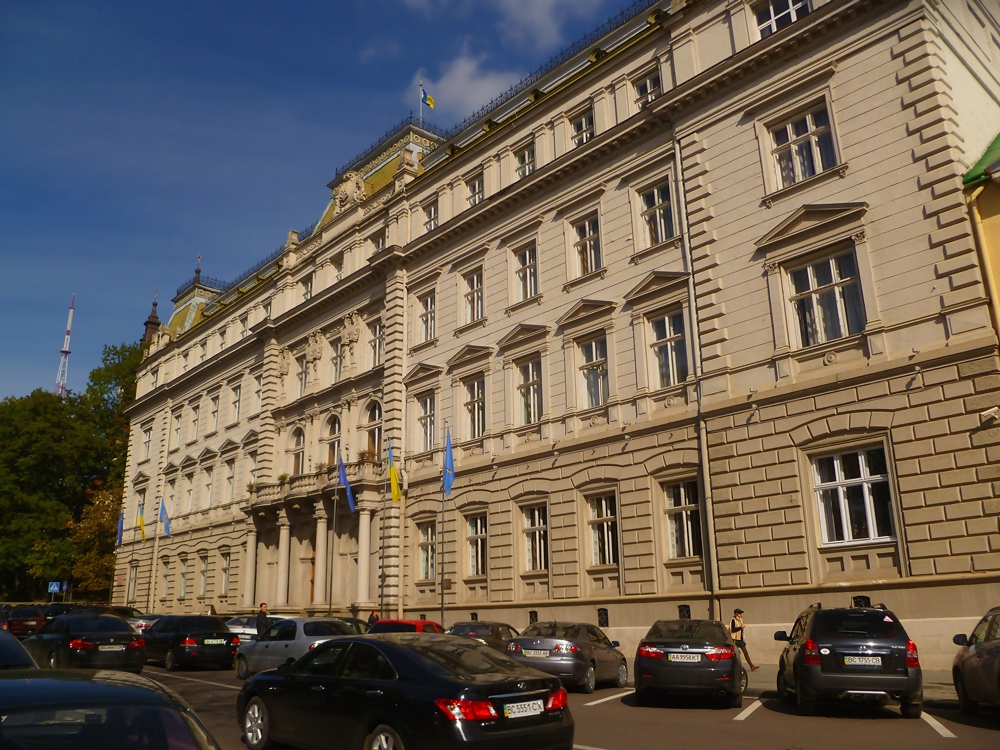
Building of the Lviv Regional Council

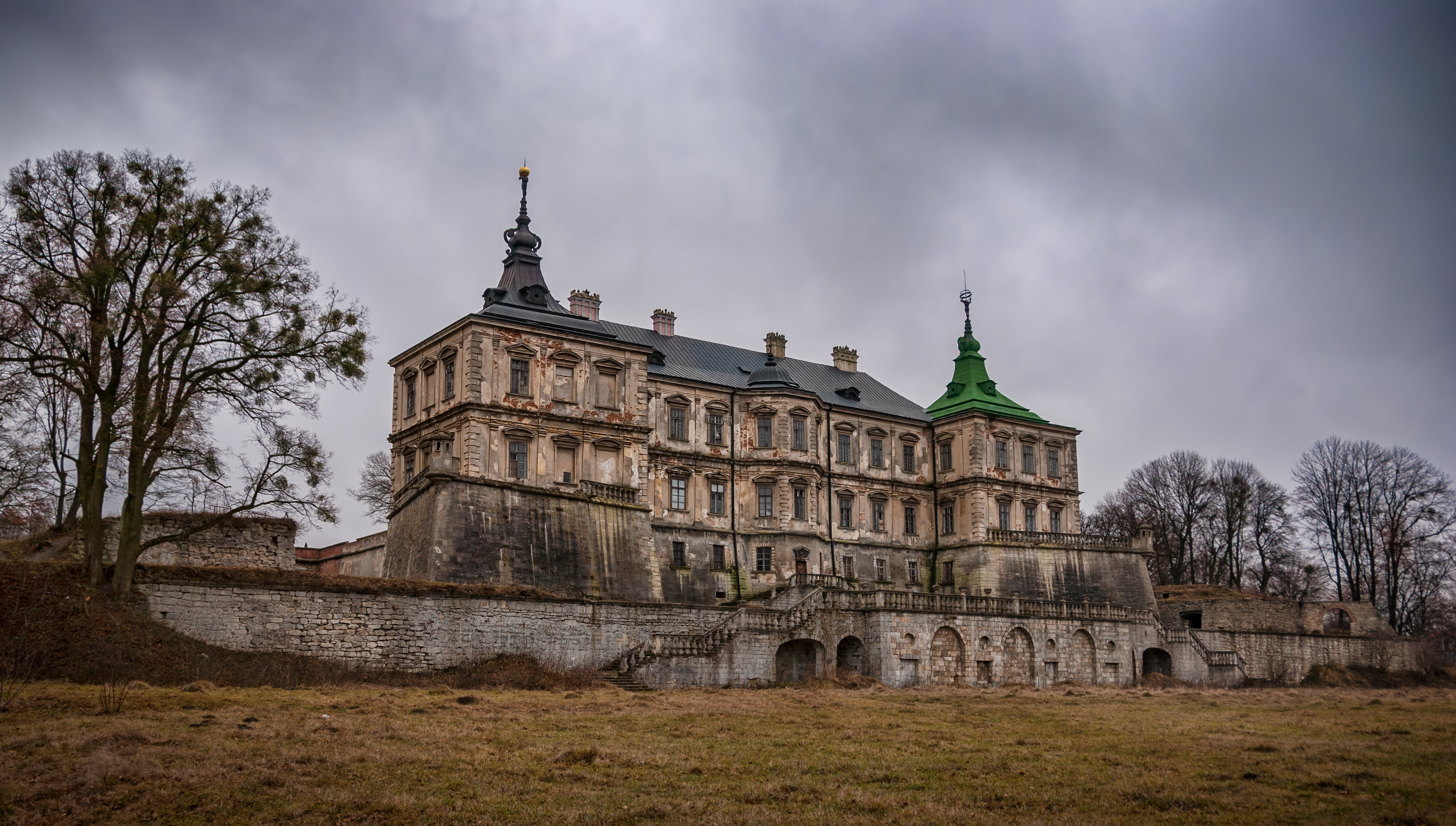
Pidhirtsi Casle

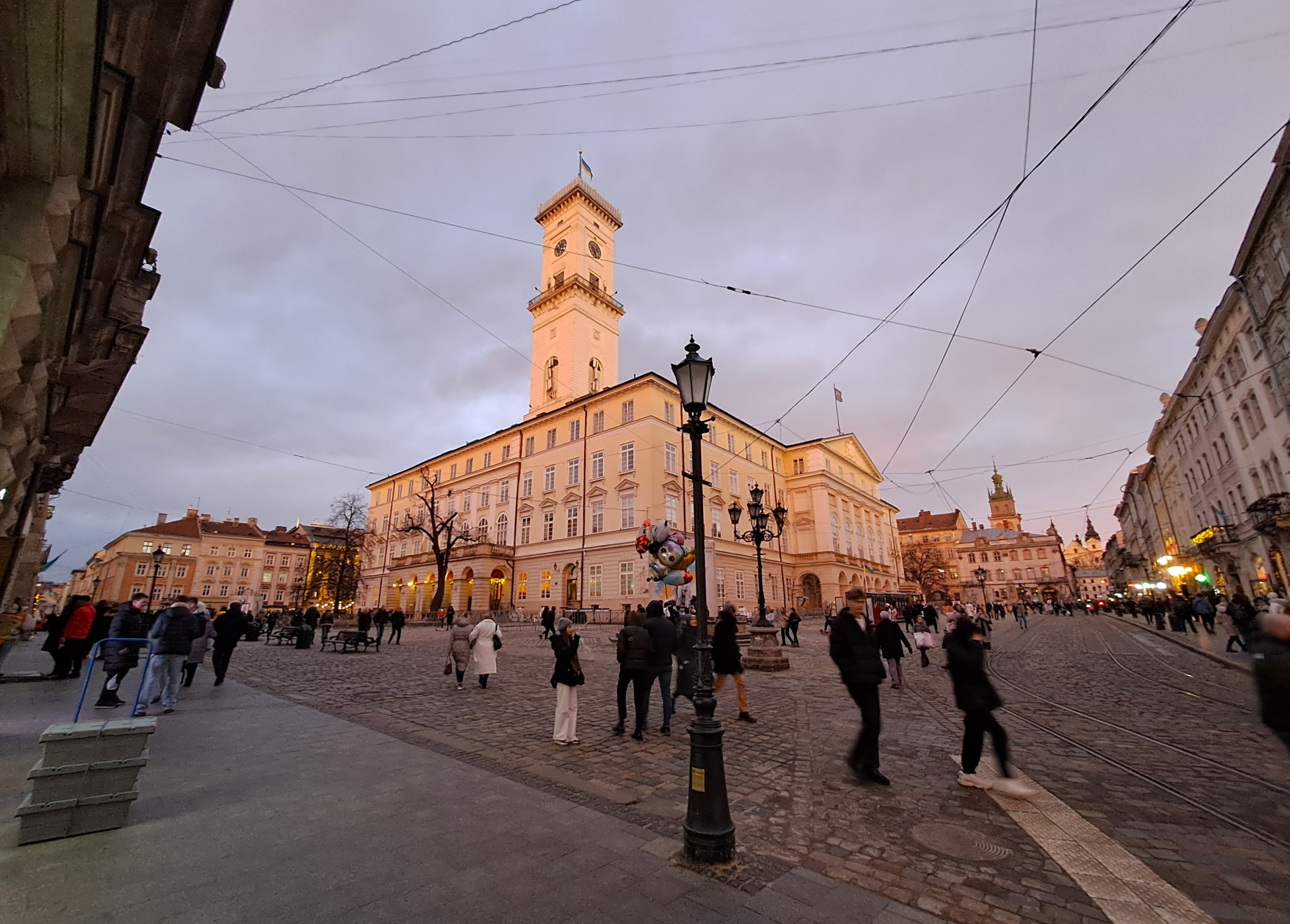
Lviv Town Hall

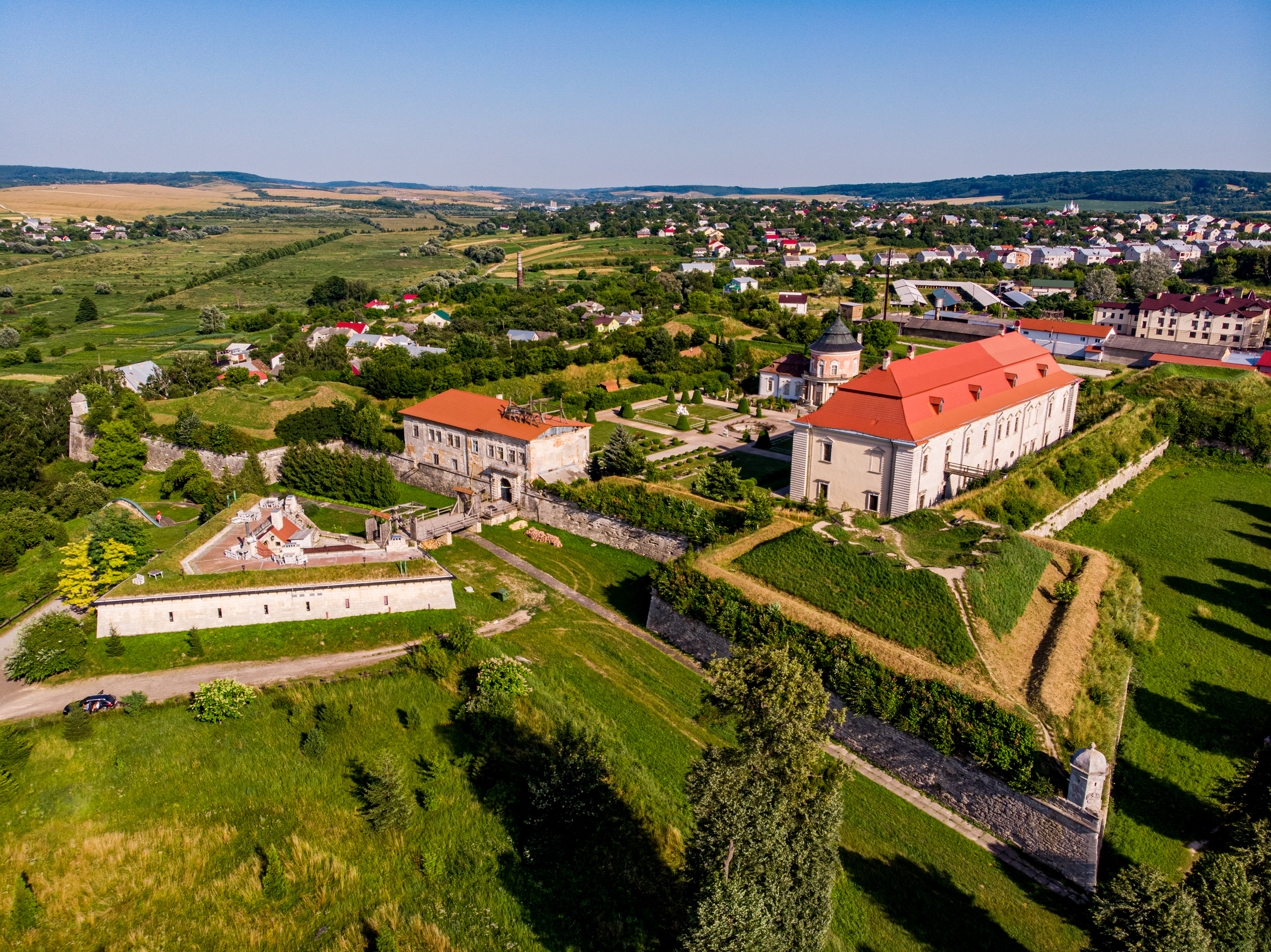
Zolochiv Castle

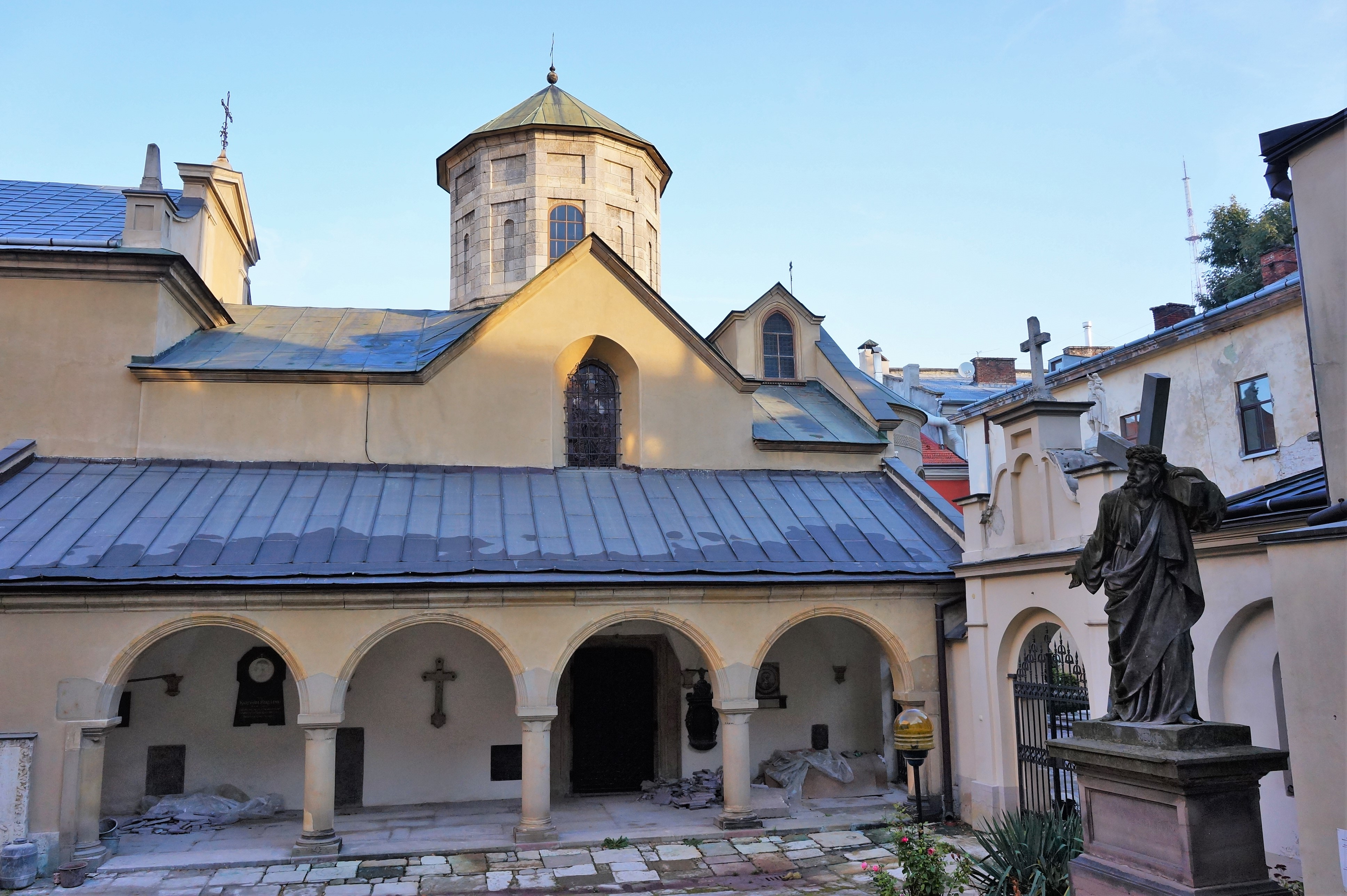
Armenian Cathedral of Lviv

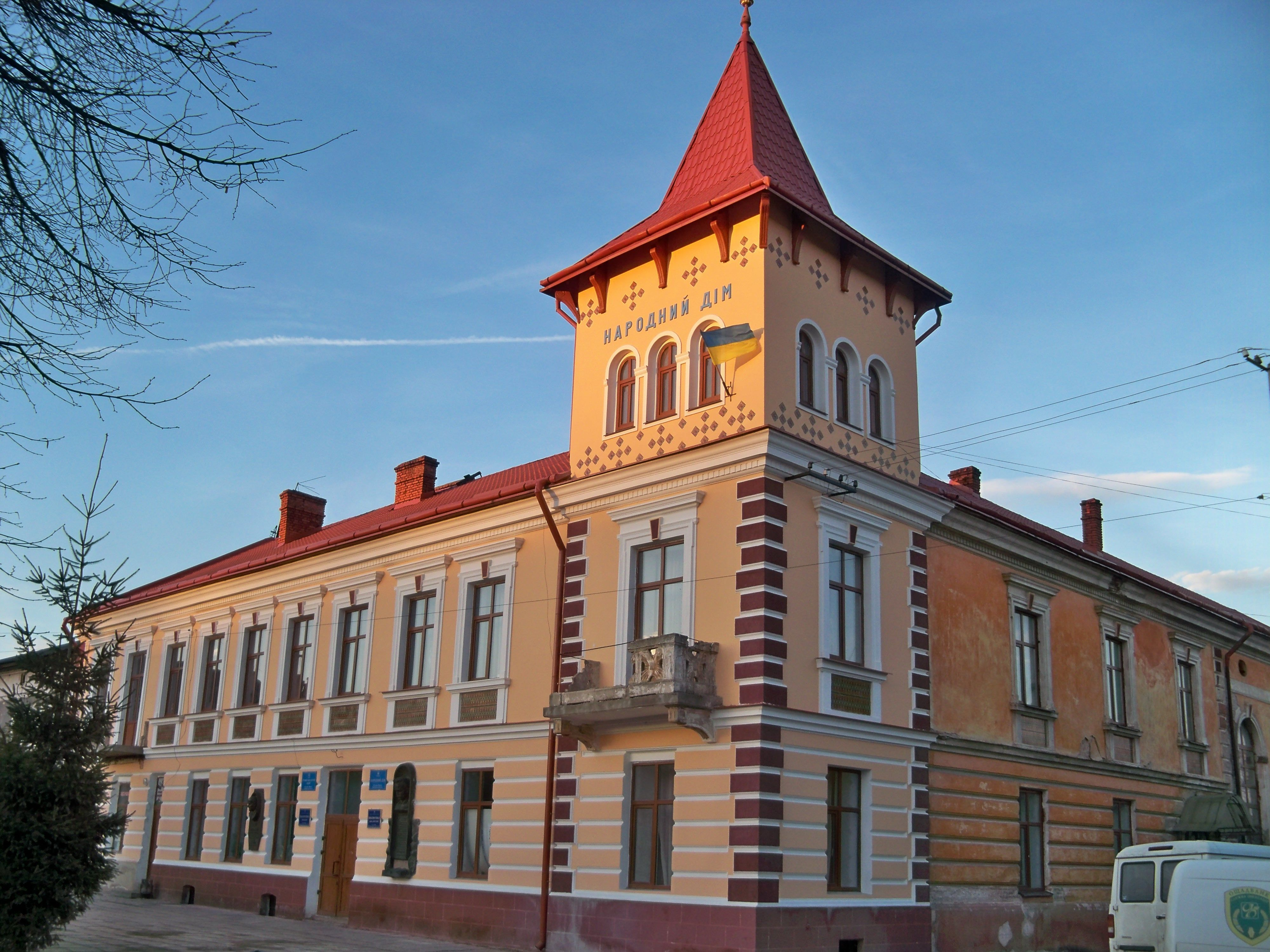
Narodnyi dim in Sudova Vyshnia

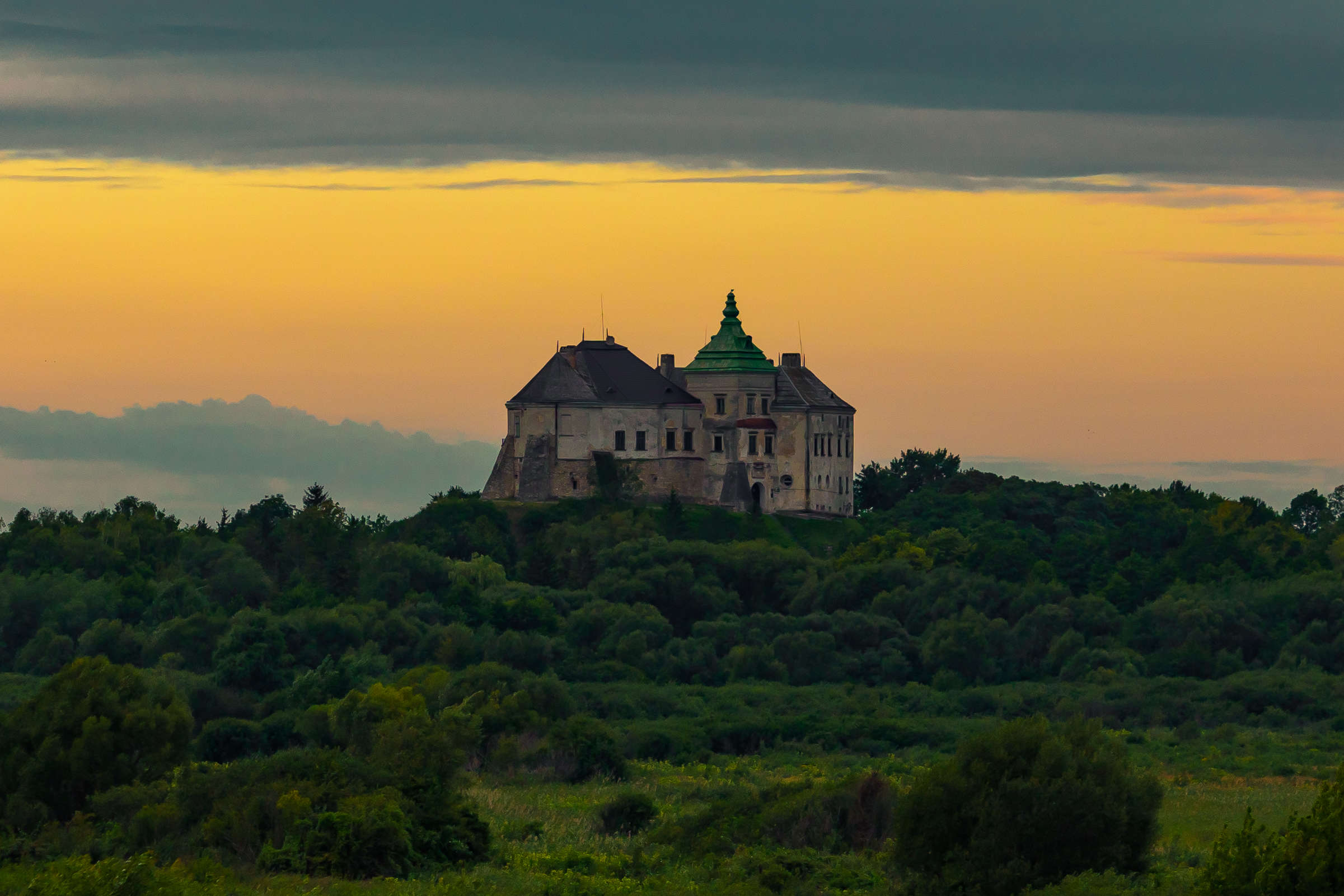
Olesko Castle

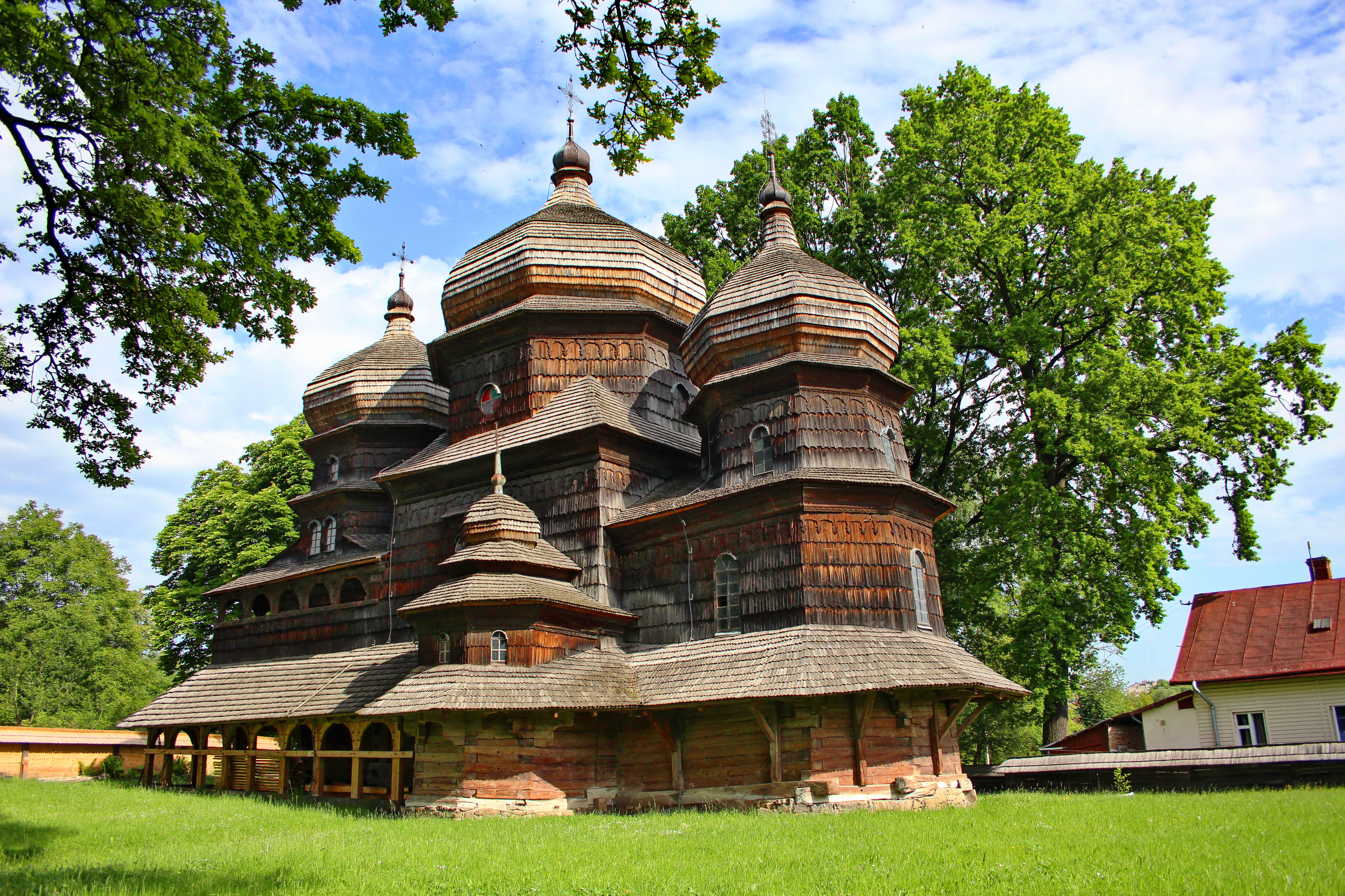
Church of St. George in Drohobych

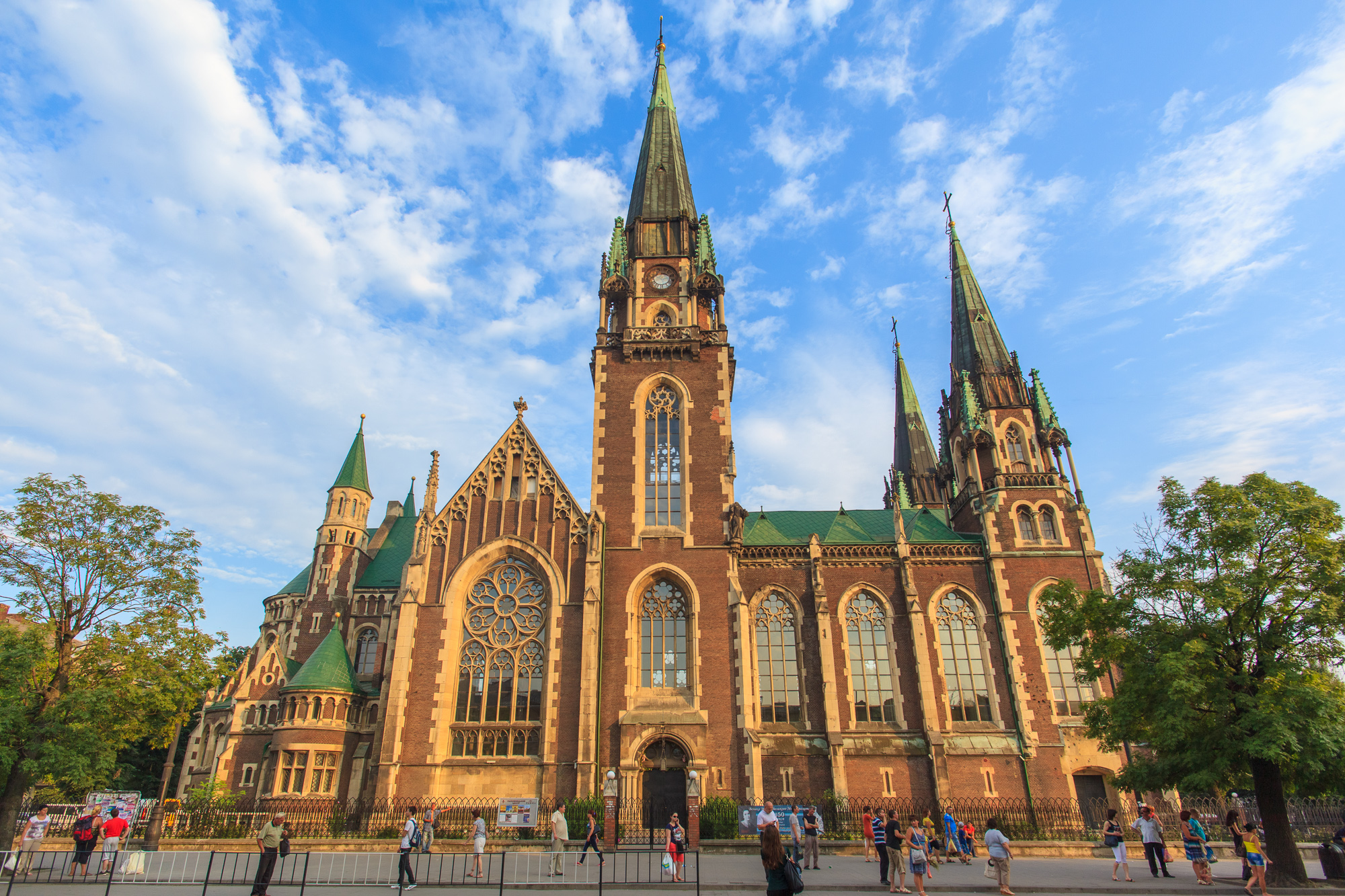
Church of Sts. Olha and Elizabeth in Lviv

== Economy ==
The most important research into cereal epidemics in the country is undertaken here. The National Academy of Agrarian Sciences of Ukraine's Institute of Agriculture in Obroshino is the center of study for cereal pathogens including powdery mildew of barley. In the early 2000s the most active researchers here were Olga Vronska and G. Kosilovich at the IoA. Puccinia recondita, Blumeria graminis and various Pseudocercosporella spp. are present and are significant in winter wheat in this oblast.

Two introduced banded land snails, the Grove Snail (Cepaea nemoralis) and White-Lipped Snail (C. hortensis) are found here. C. n. was intentionally brought here in the late 1800s, but the genetic analysis of Gural-Sverlova et al., 2021 shows continued introductions have also occurred ever since. (The geographic distribution of both suggests they arrive through the gardening trade, as is known from other countries.) This analysis shows several distinct arrivals of C. n. yielding several present-day populations in and around Lviv.

== See also ==
- List of Canadian place names of Ukrainian origin; Ukrainian immigrants to Canada brought place names from this oblast with them to Alberta, Manitoba, and Saskatchewan.
- Poland's Lwów Voivodeship (1921–1939)
- Subdivisions of Ukraine
