= Zavodske =

Zavodske is a name of several localities in Ukraine:

- Zavodske, Poltava Oblast, a city in Poltava Oblast formerly known as Chervonozavodske
- Zavodske, Ternopil Oblast, an urban-type settlement in Ternopil Oblast
