= Lypnyky =

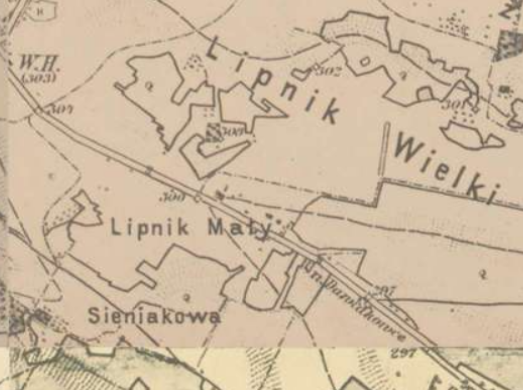
Lypnyky on the map of Austrian map, 19th century

Lypnyky (formerly Mali and Velyki Lypnyky) is a hamlet in Chortkiv Raion in Ternopil Oblast of Ukraine. It is on the site of which the village of Zavodske was built at the same time as the Chortkiv Sugar Plant.

== Name ==
The historical name of the hamlet was formed semantically from the geographical term lypnyk, which means 'linden forest', 'small linden forest'. That is, its name comes from the location near the tract Lypnyk on the basis of the fact that in this area of large forest dominated by linden trees.

== History ==
Founded in the late 19th century.

Before the Second World War there were 12 peasant farms. On the farm, on the site of the current hospital, there was a farm of Mr. Rynchakovskyi, where there was a house, farm buildings, a garden, a large apiary, 10 hectares of land. Local peasants worked on this land for a fee. The war did not affect the village, as troops were only moving through the village. In the post-war period, three Polish families left the village, and three immigrant families arrived from Poland. Authorities accused and convicted two residents of the village of aiding the UPA. They were serving sentences in the Magadan region (RF).

In 1950, in the process of collectivization, the Lipnyky hamlet was annexed to the neighboring village of Pastushe, which was part of the Lenin collective farm. Land, household equipment and cattle were confiscated from the peasants.

== People ==
In 1952, the farm had 27 yards and 121 inhabitants.

== Sources ==
- До питання перейменування Заводського на Липники, або Пошуки історичної справедливості Archived 2021-04-19 at the Wayback Machine // Свобода. — 2021. — 8 квітня.
- Погорецький В. Чортківщина. Історико-туристичний путівник. — Тернопіль: Астон, 2007. — 188 с. : іл. ISBN 978-966-308-206-0
- "Lipnik". Geographical Dictionary of the Kingdom of Poland (in Polish). 5. Warszawa: Kasa im. Józefa Mianowskiego. 1884. p. 275.
