= Zavodske, Ternopil Oblast =

Urban locality in Ternopil Oblast, Ukraine

Zavodske Заводське
- Rural settlement
- Location of Zavodske in Ternopil Oblast Location of Zavodske in Ukraine
- Coordinates: 48°59′47″N 25°51′32″E
- Country: Ukraine
- Oblast: Ternopil Oblast
- Raion: Chortkiv Raion
- Hromada: Zavodske settlement hromada
- Established: 1981

Area
  - Total: 5 km^{2} (1.9 sq mi)
- Elevation: 300 m (980 ft)

Population (2022)
  - Total: 3,300
  - Density: 660/km^{2} (1,700/sq mi)
- Time zone: UTC+2 (EET)
  - Summer (DST): UTC+3 (EEST)
- Postal code: 48523
- Area code: +380 3552
- Website: http://rada.gov.ua/

Zavodske (Ukrainian: Заводське) is a rural settlement in Chortkiv Raion, Ternopil Oblast, western Ukraine. It hosts the administration of Zavodske settlement hromada, one of the hromadas of Ukraine. Population: 3,300 (2022 estimate).

== History ==
The settlement was built on the site of the village of Lypnyky at the same time as the construction of the Chortkiv Sugar Plant.

Zavodske was established as an urban-type settlement in 1981. On 26 January 2024, a new law entered into force which abolished the status of urban-type settlement, and Zavodske became a rural settlement.

Its population was 3,087 as of the 2001 Ukrainian Census.
