= Alphons Barb =

Austrian academic

Alphons Augustinus Barb (born: Alfons Ascher Barb; 15 April 1901 – 13 November 1979) was an Austrian academic, archaeologist, numismatist, museum director and author who received recognition both from his native Austria and in Britain for his contribution to the Arts and Sciences. He was the founding director of the Burgenland Landesmuseum in Eisenstadt, Austria and throughout his life remained a committed advocate for this region and its people. Being Jewish, he was removed from his job as a public servant immediately following the Anschluss and fled to Britain with his young family. In 1949 Barb joined the Warburg Institute, ultimately becoming Librarian and publishing extensively in both English and German.

== Family and education ==
The son of Moriz Barb, an engineer in the Austro-Hungarian army, and Henrietta Schrenzel, Barb was born in Vienna, the second of four children. His grandfathers were Isaac Barb and D. H. Schrenzel from Galicia (now Ukraine), both notable for their roles in the revival of the Hebrew language during the mid 19th century. A student at the University of Vienna, he was obliged to put his studies on hold to support his family by working as a goldsmith. Under the tutelage of Wilhelm Kubitschek, he finally received his doctorate at the age of 25 for his thesis on the coinage of Cilicia. During his time at the university, Barb was selected to work on archaeological digs by Adolf Mahr in support of whom he gave testimony after the war during the latter's denazification process.

== Austria and the Anschluss ==
Shortly after receiving his doctorate, Barb was chosen by Sándor Wolf, the philanthropist, art collector and wine merchant, to create and manage the Landesmuseum for the Burgenland. In his role as director of the museum he was a tireless advocate for the region's culture, history and environment. However, as was the case for all Jews operating as public servants at the time of the Anschluss, he was dismissed from his post and then required to leave Eisenstadt. With the support of ESG Robinson, then Deputy Keeper of the Coin and Medal Department, British Museum he was given entry to the United Kingdom but following the outbreak of war was interned on the Isle of Man as an enemy alien. He was subsequently released to work as a factory tool-fitter in Leeds, where he remained for a number of years.

== Warburg Institute ==
In 1949 Barb took up the role of assistant librarian at the Warburg Institute, becoming librarian in 1956. He worked under a number of directors, including E.H. Gombrich, and, in addition to his special interest in the Burgenland, continued to publish extensively on the fields of folklore and magic in the ancient world.

== Honours and awards ==
Austrian Cross of Honour for Science and Art First Class

Grand Decoration of the Burgenland

Fellow of the Society of Antiquaries of London

Honorary Fellow of the Royal Numismatic Society
