= Zavadiv, Mostyska urban hromada, Yavoriv Raion, Lviv Oblast =

Rural locality in Lviv Oblast, Ukraine

Zavadiv Завадів
- Coordinates: 49.7717°N 23.2508°E
- Country: Ukraine
- Oblast: Lviv Oblast
- Raion: Yavoriv Raion

Zavadiv (Ukrainian: Зава́дів) is a village (selo) in Yavoriv Raion, Lviv Oblast (province) of western Ukraine. It belongs to Mostyska urban hromada, one of the hromadas of Ukraine.

Until 18 July 2020, Zavadiv belonged to Mostyska Raion. The raion was abolished in July 2020 as part of the administrative reform of Ukraine, which reduced the number of raions of Lviv Oblast to seven. The area of Mostyska Raion was merged into Yavoriv Raion.
