= Dovhomostyska =

Village in Lviv Oblast, Ukraine

Dovhomostyska Довгомостиська
- Village
- Location within Lviv Oblast Location within Ukraine
- Coordinates: 49.77306°N 23.42444°E
- Country: Ukraine
- Oblast: Lviv Oblast
- Raion: Yavoriv Raion
- Hromada: Sudova Vyshnia urban hromada
- First mentioned: 1437
- Elevation: 236 m (774 ft)

Population (2001)
  - Total: 775
- Time zone: UTC+2 (Eastern European Time)
  - Summer (DST): UTC+3 (Eastern European Summer Time)
- Postal code: 81342
- Area code: +380 3234

Dovhomostyska (Ukrainian: Довгомостиська) is a village in Yavoriv Raion, Lviv Oblast, western Ukraine. It is part of the Sudova Vyshnia urban hromada. According to the 2001 All-Ukrainian Population Census, the village had a population of 775 people.

== History ==
Dovhomostyska was first mentioned in historical records in 1437 as Domahostyska, and was renamed in 1589. Historically, the village formed part of the region of Galicia, which experienced frequent changes in political control from the early modern period through the 20th century.

== Geography ==
The village is located in western Lviv Oblast at an elevation of approximately 236 metres above sea level. The surrounding area is predominantly rural and characterized by agricultural land use.

== Administration ==
Administratively, Dovhomostyska belongs to the Sudova Vyshnia urban hromada in Yavoriv Raion. As part of the 2020 administrative reform of Ukraine, the village was transferred from Mostyska Raion to Yavoriv Raion.

== Demographics ==
According to the 2001 census, the population of Dovhomostyska was 775, with the majority of residents identifying Ukrainian as their native language.

== Economy ==
The local economy is based primarily on agriculture and small-scale local services. The village is connected economically to nearby towns within the Sudova Vyshnia area.
