= Heinrich Alfred Barb =

Austro-Hungarian scholar (1826–1883)

Heinrich Alfred Barb (1 January 1826 – 2 June 1883) was a Galician academic, university director, civil servant, interpreter and author who received recognition both from his native Austro - Hungary and overseas for his contribution to the Arts and Sciences, and in particular towards the study of Persian and oriental languages. He was the director of what is now the Diplomatic Academy of Vienna (at that time still the Oriental Academy). Born Jewish, he formally left the Jewish faith on 1 February 1884 while in his first year of law at the University of Vienna and rose in the civil service to the rank of Hofrat, a distinction rarely accorded to those of Jewish ancestry.

== Family and Education ==
The son of Josef Barb, the town medical officer, and Rosalia Hiller, Barb was born in Mostyska, one of three brothers. His cousin was Isaac Barb, notable for his role in the revival of the Hebrew language during the mid-19th century. Barb's renunciation of the Jewish faith caused an irrevocable break with his family. He never married.

== Honours and awards ==
- Knight of the Order of the Iron Crown III Class
- Golden Civil Service Cross with Crown
- Austrian Golden Medal for the Arts and Sciences
- The Most Noble Order of the Crown of Thailand
- Order of Glory (Ottoman Empire)
- Order of the Lion and the Sun
- Order of the Medjidie III Class
