= Ivan Rutkovych =

Ruthenian painter

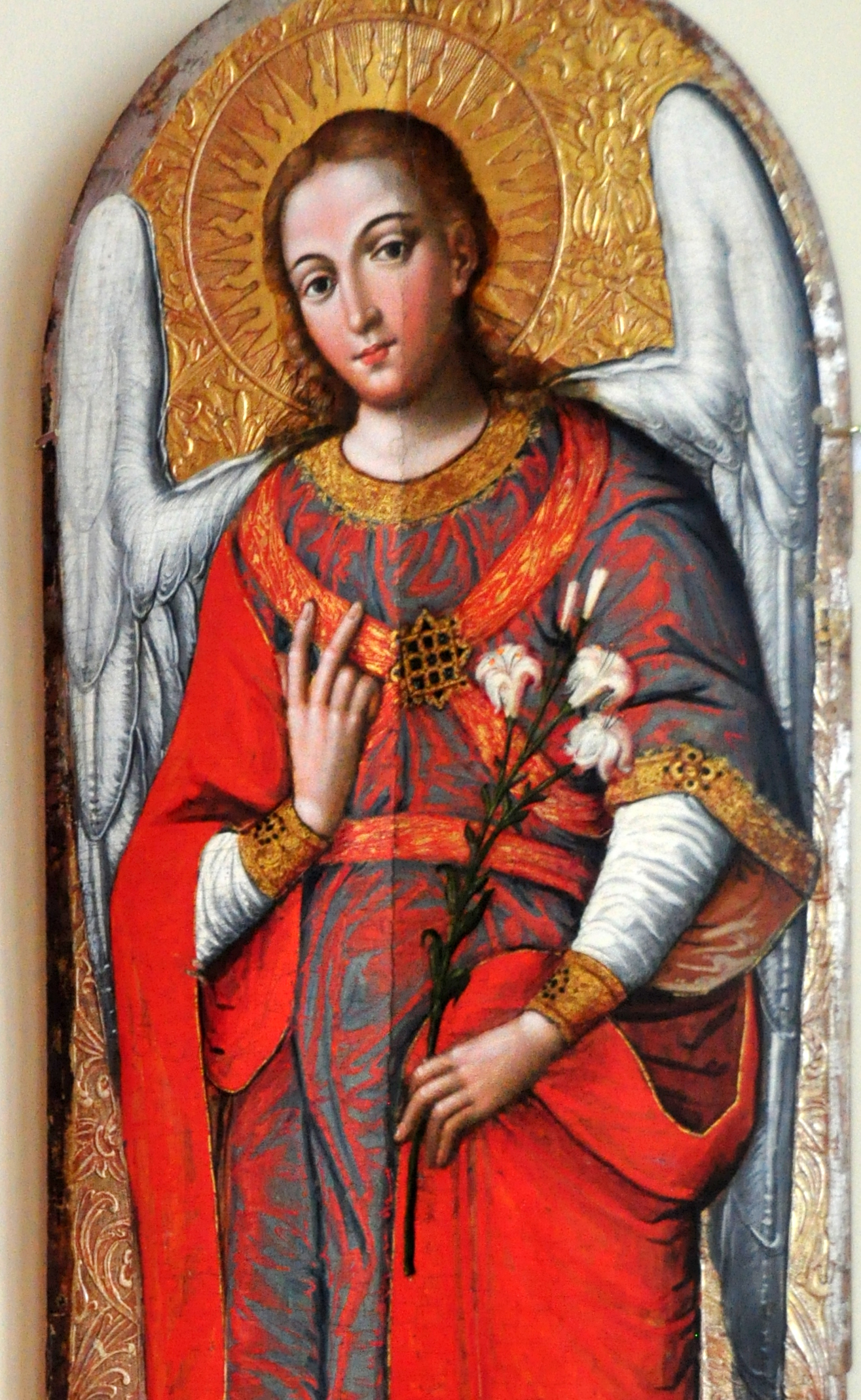
Gabriel the Archangel, 1697–99, Lviv National Museum

Ivan Rutkovych (Polish: Iwan Rutkowicz, Ukrainian: Іван Руткович), born c. 1650 in Bilyi Kamin, near Zolochiv, Lviv region, Polish–Lithuanian Commonwealth, died after 1708, was a Ruthenian icon painter who worked mostly in Zhovkva and Univ.

== Biography ==
Ivan Rutkovych is considered a founder of the Zhovkva Iconographic School of painting and wood carving.

Some of Rutkovych's work was lost, but there is still a significant amount of well-preserved icons, as well as iconostases, made by Rutkovych together with other masters. There are iconostases of the wooden churches in Volytsia Derevlianska (1680–82), Volia Vysotska (1688–89); the large (10,85 х 11,87 m) iconostasis of the Church of Christ's Nativity in Zhovkva (also known as iconostasis from Nova Skvariava) (1697–99), now in Lviv National Museum. The last is considered as a masterpiece among Ukrainian iconostases of that time. It consists from 7 rows of icons. It was restored and exhibited to the public in 2009. Also in Lviv National Museum are preserved separate icons, among them Supplication (1683) from Potelych village, Lviv region.

The artistic style of Ivan Rutkovych combines Byzantine tradition of expressing religious subjects with modern European influences, more secular and realistic.

Rutkovych is a most prominent representative of Zhovkva Iconographic School of painting and wood carving. According to art historians, in that time new iconographical cannons were established, giving free rein to the artist to reveal his individual style with maximum care for detail. A score of local schools sprang up in Sudova Vyshnia, Zhovkva, Robotychi, Volyn region and other.

The iconostasis of The Holy Trinity Church in Zhovkva shows the contribution of different masters, among them Vasyl Petranovych (icon of Savoir, icon of Our Lady), Hnat Stobensky (carving of the Holy Door) and Ivan Rutkovych himself (Annunciation, Christmas, Archangel Michael). The Church has been placed on the UNESCO World Heritage List since 2013.

In Lviv and Zhovkva there is the street named after Ivan Rutkovych.

Rutkovich died between 1703 and 1708.

== Gallery ==
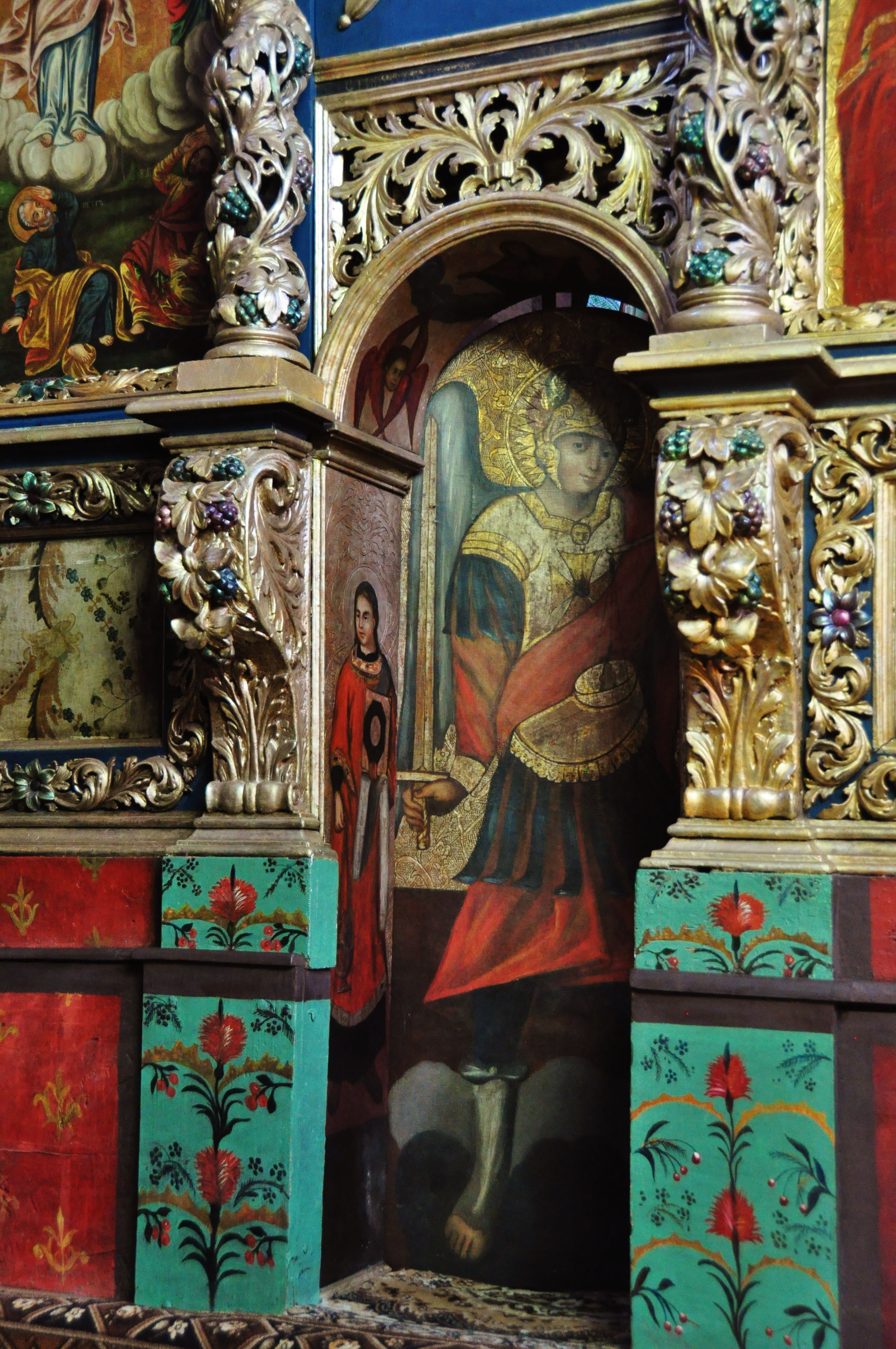
St. Michael from Holy Trinity Church, Zhovkva

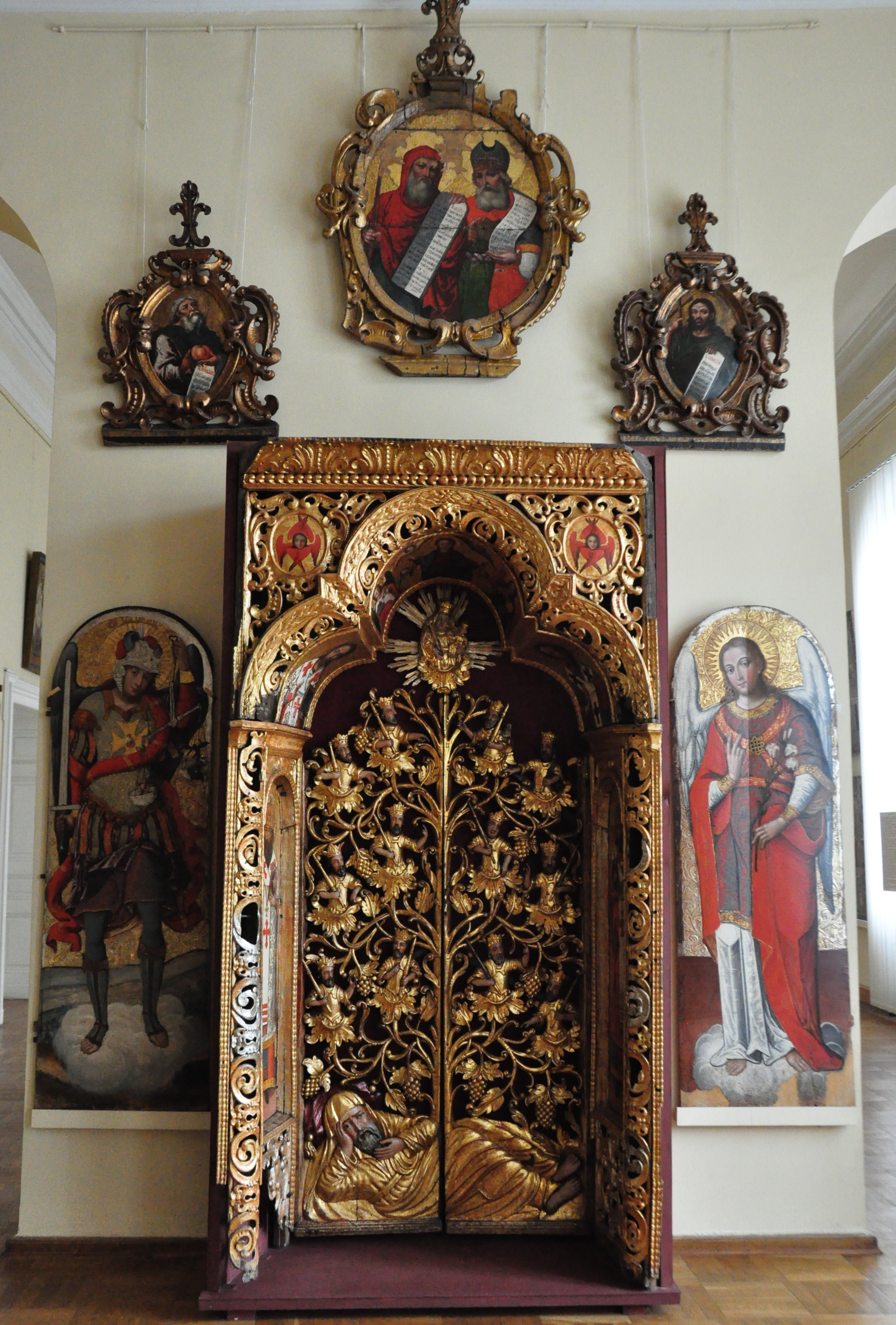
Part of iconostasis from Skvariava Nova, Lviv National Museum

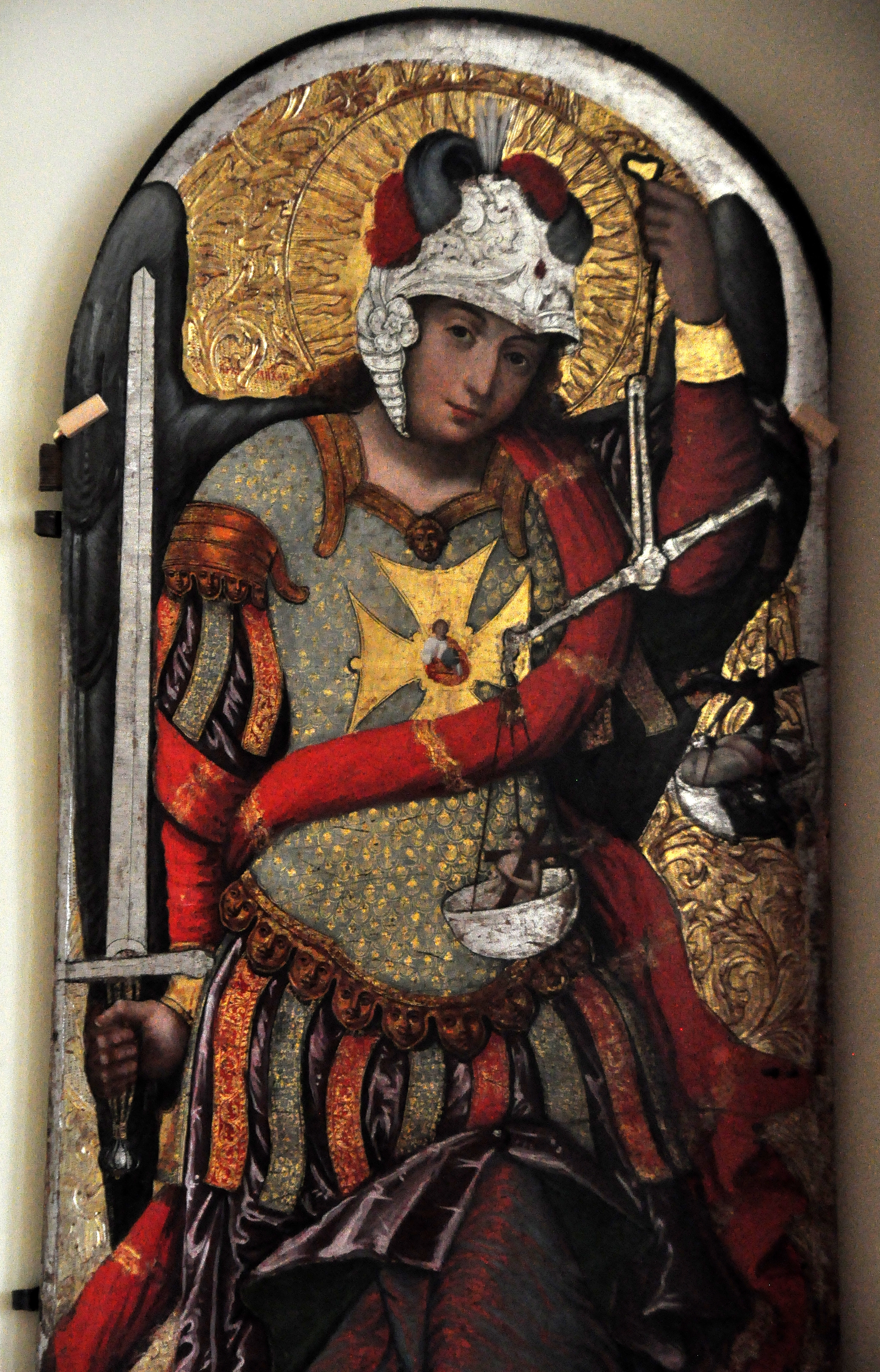
St. Michael from Skvariava Nova, Lviv National Museum

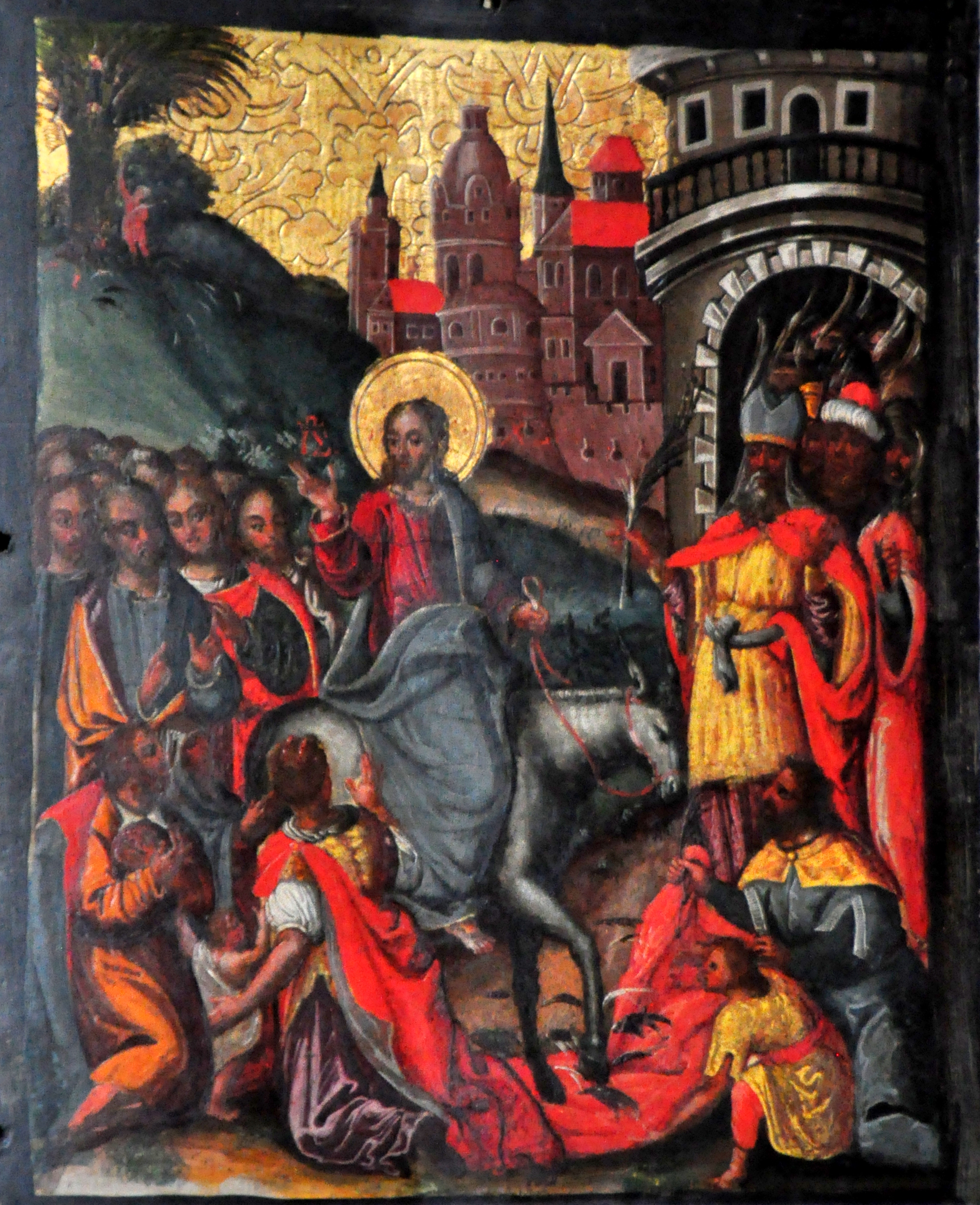

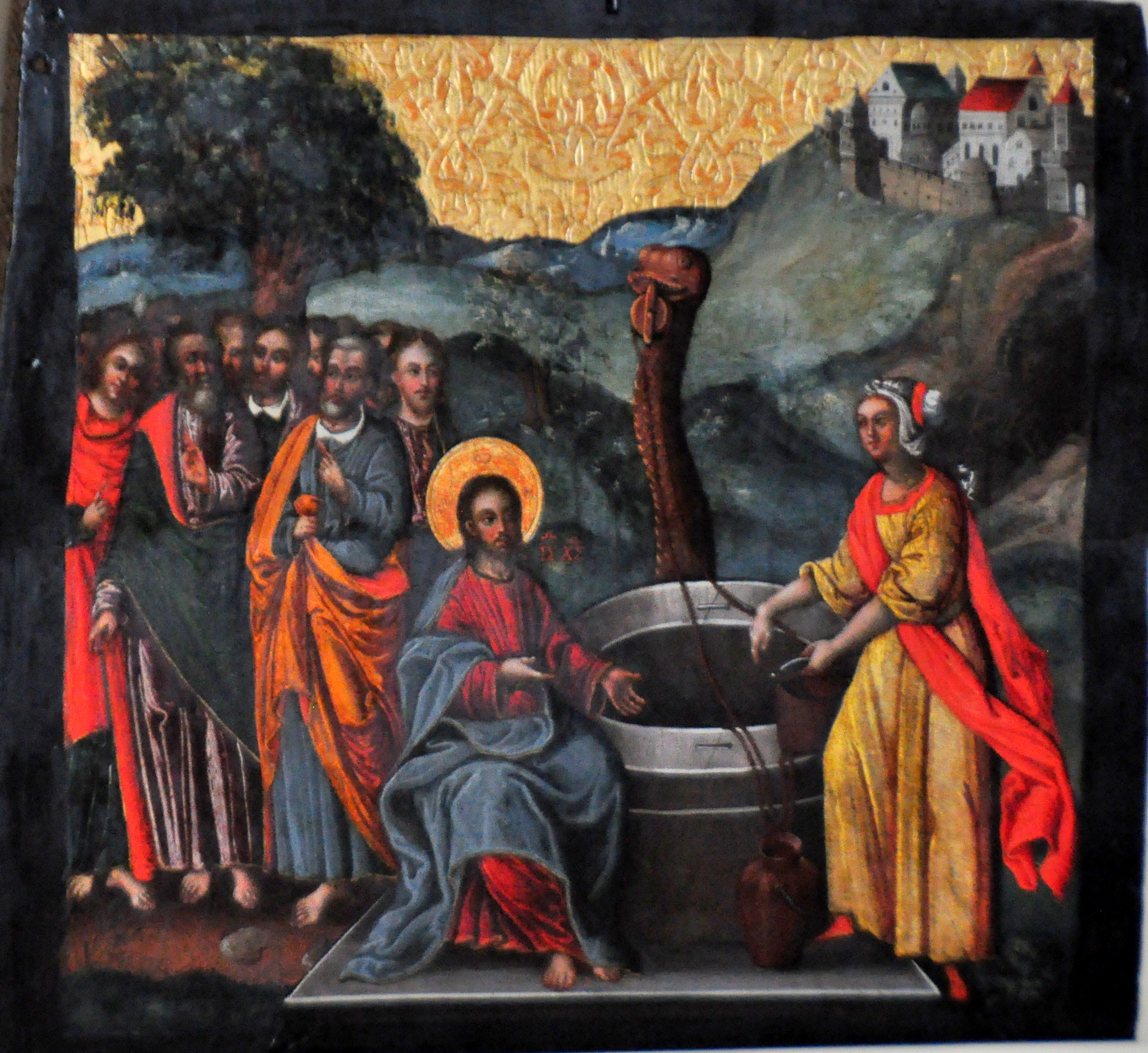

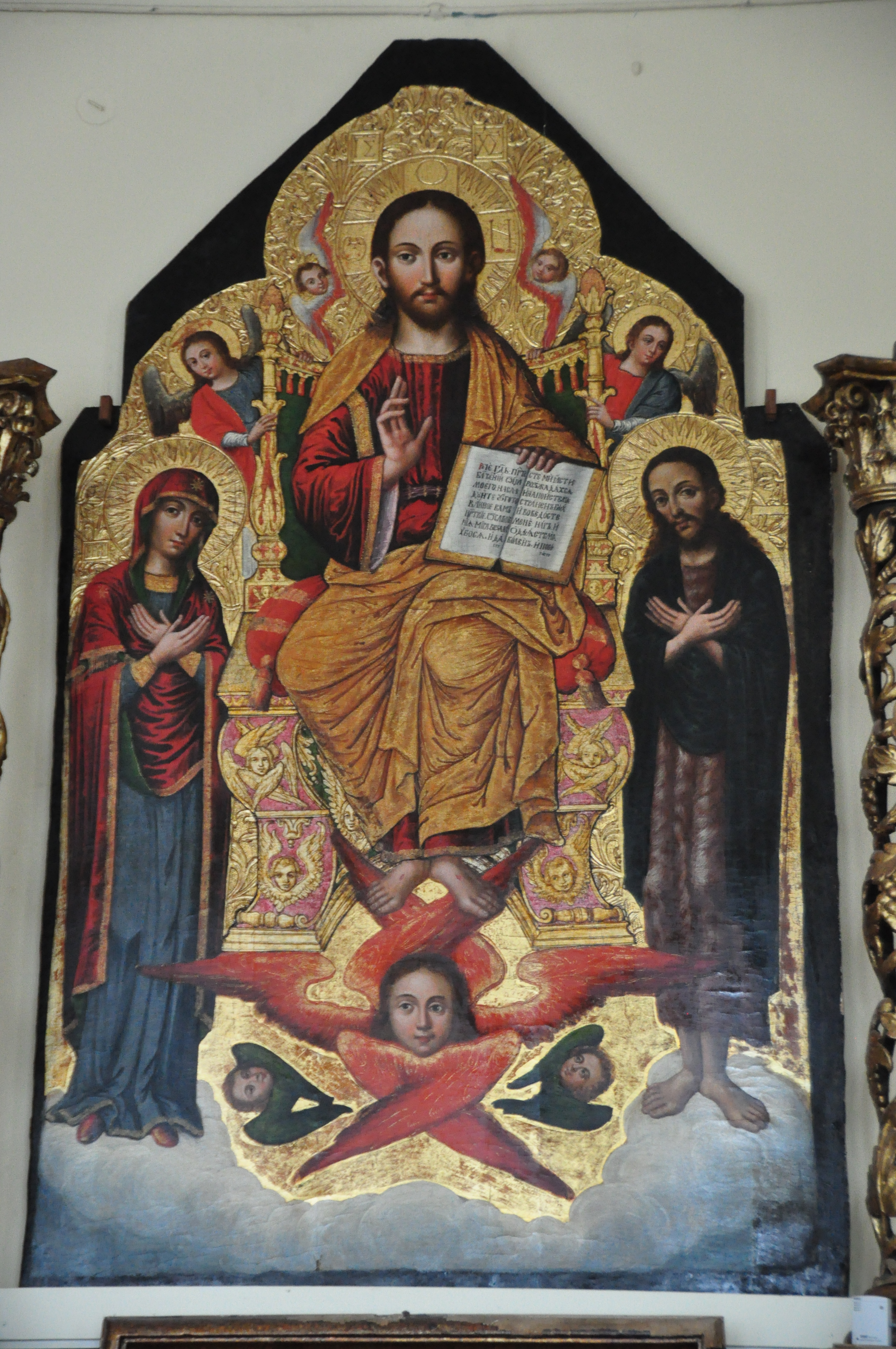

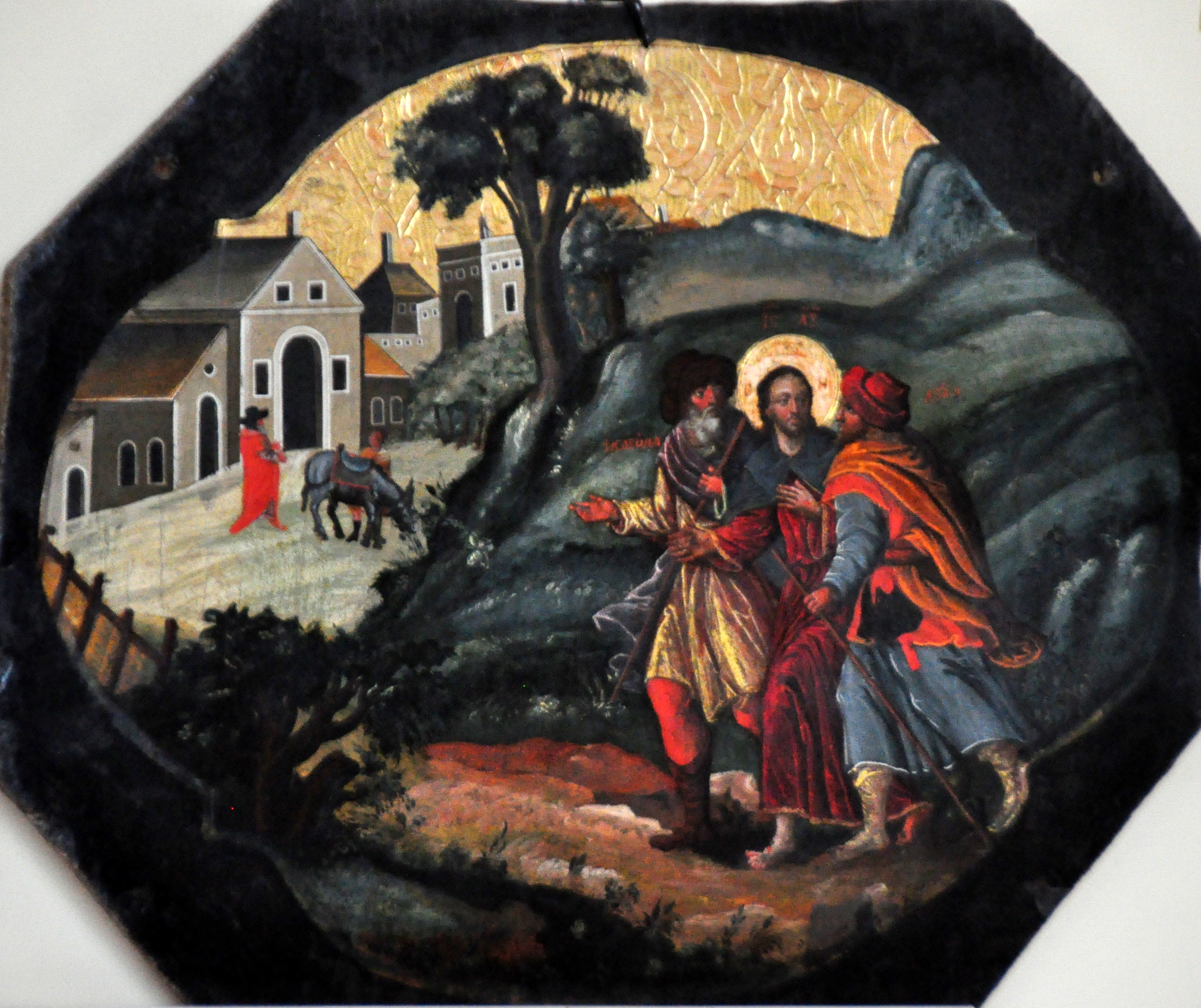

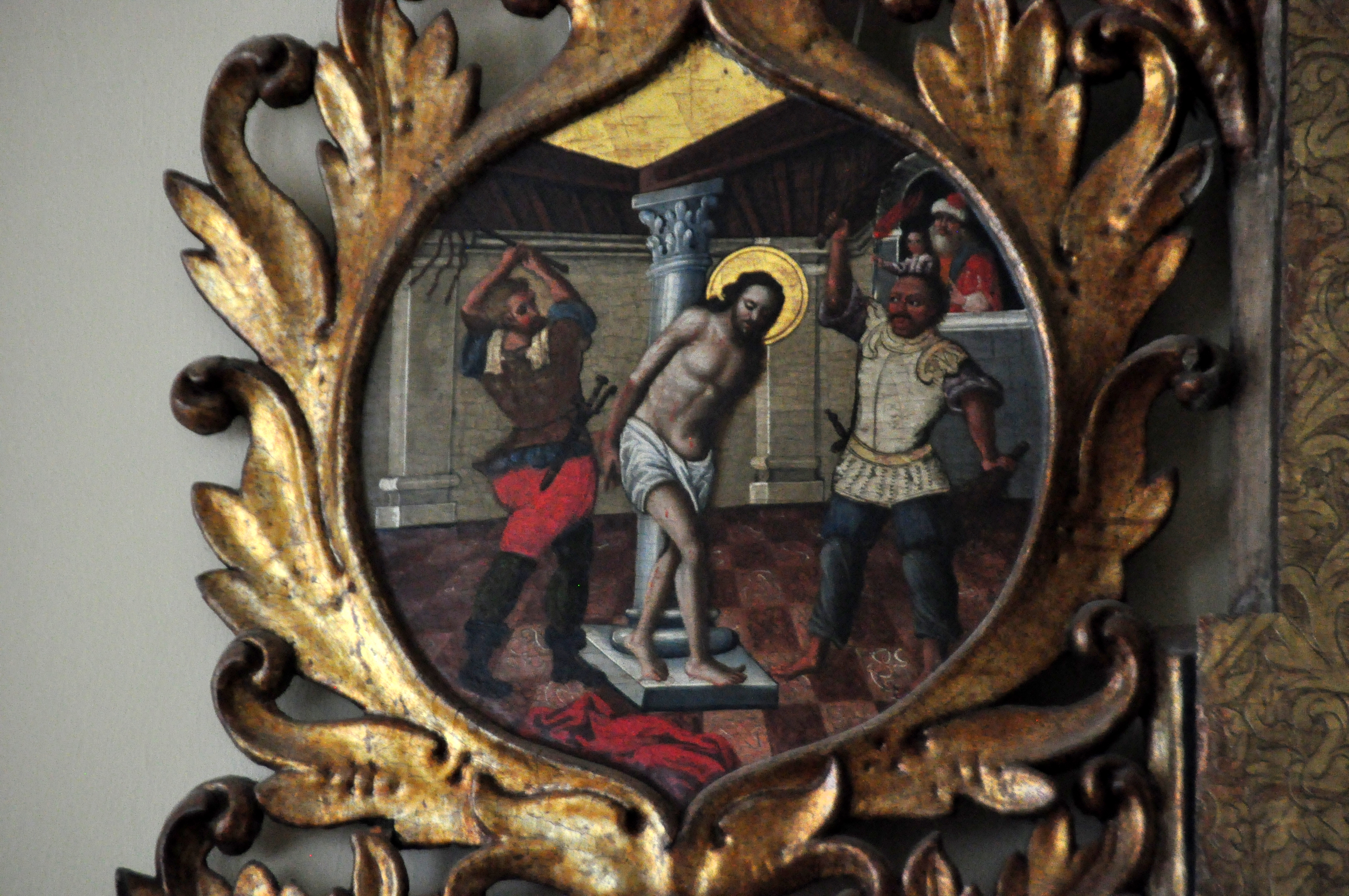

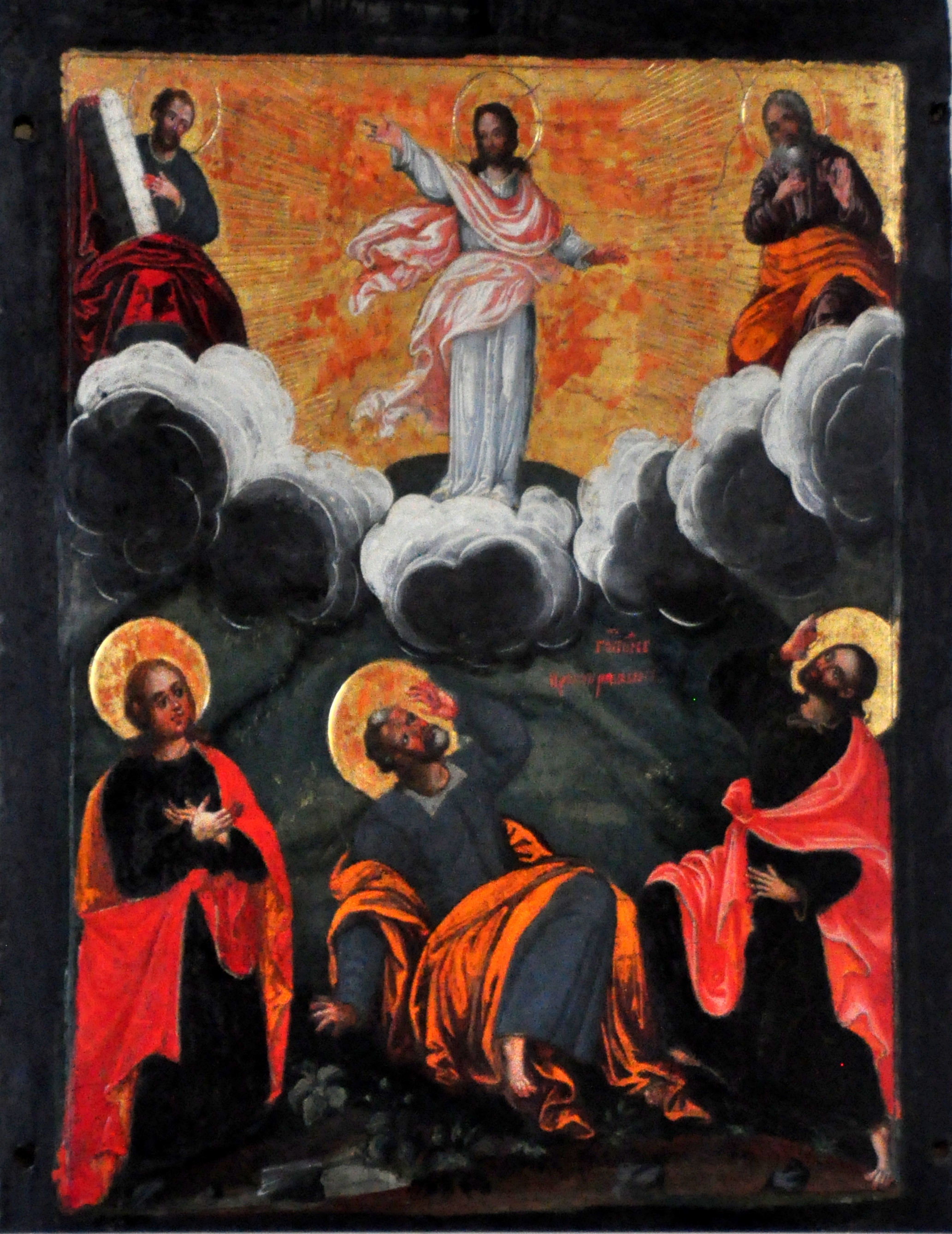

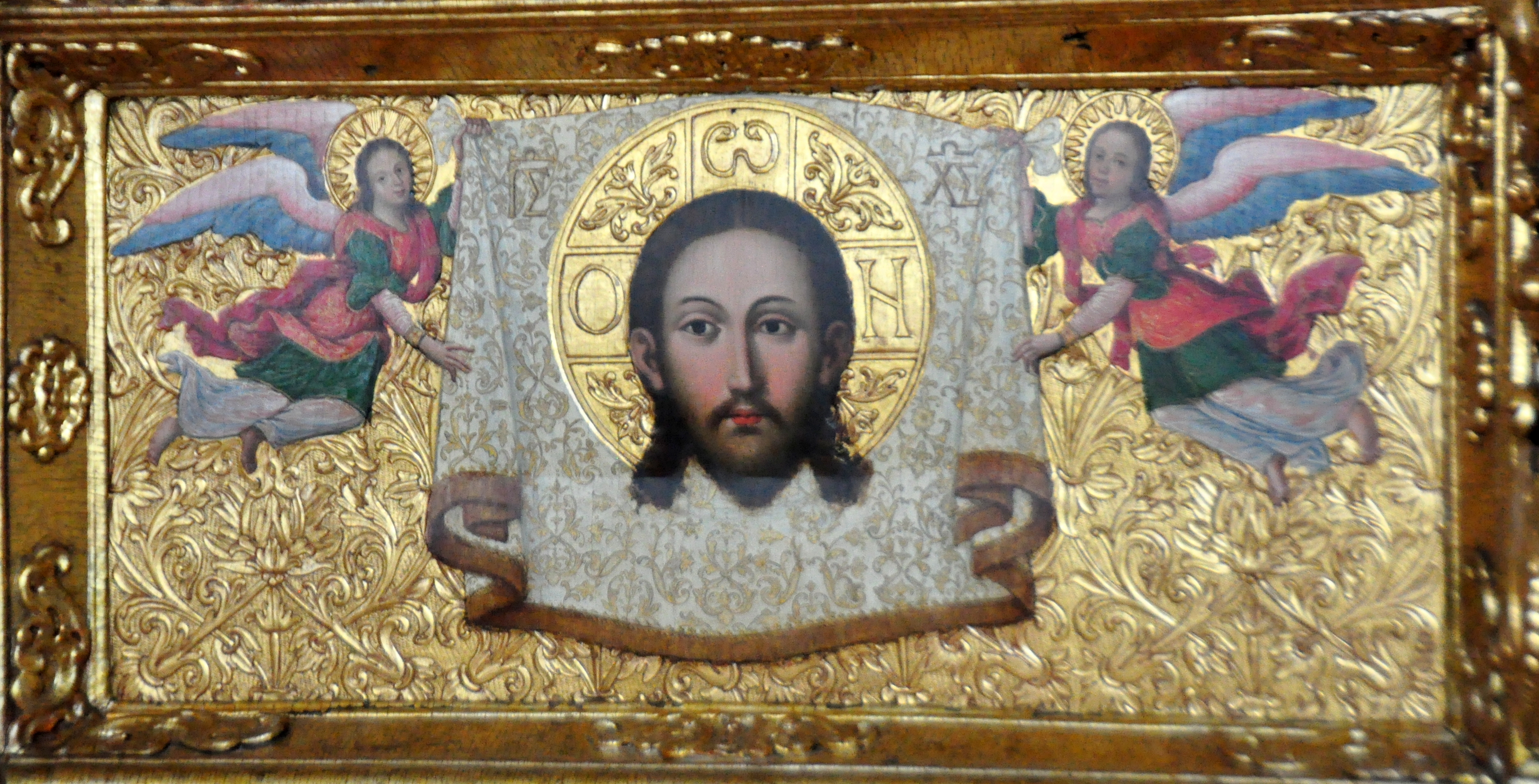
