= Sudova Vyshnia =

City in Lviv Oblast, Ukraine

Sudova Vyshnia Судова Вишня Sądowa Wisznia
- City
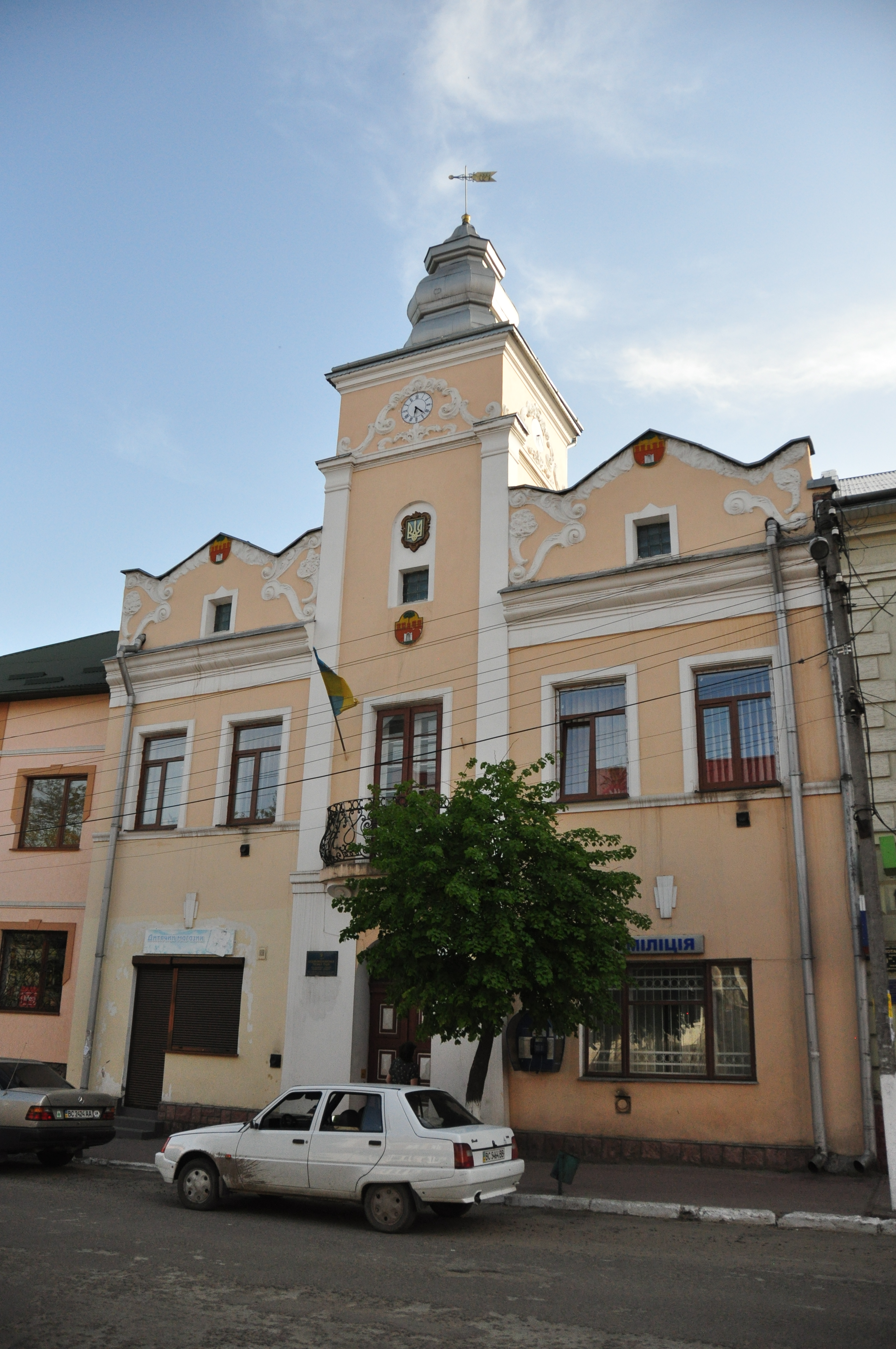
- Town hall

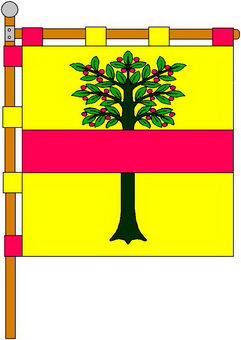
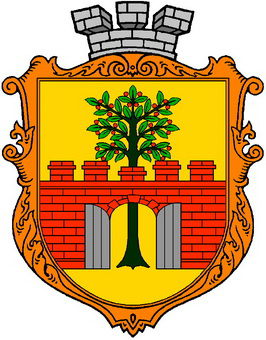
- Flag Coat of arms
- Interactive map of Sudova Vyshnia
- Location within Lviv Oblast Location within Ukraine
- Coordinates: 49°47′21″N 23°22′20″E
- Country: Ukraine
- Oblast: Lviv Oblast
- Raion: Yavoriv Raion
- Hromada: Sudova Vyshnia urban hromada
- First mentioned: 1230
- Magdeburg law: 1368

Population (2022)
  - Total: 6,470
- Time zone: UTC+2 (EET)
  - Summer (DST): UTC+3 (EEST)
- Postal code: 81340
- Area code: +380

Sudova Vyshnia (Ukrainian: Судова Вишня, IPA: [sʊˈdɔwɐ ˈwɪʃnʲɐ]; Polish: Sądowa Wisznia) is a small city in the Yavoriv Raion of the Lviv Oblast (region) of Ukraine. It hosts the administration of Sudova Vyshnia urban hromada, one of the hromadas of Ukraine. Its population is 6,470 (2022 estimate).

The town has a number of Catholic cathedrals and a secondary school, and is a market centre for the surrounding agricultural area. In the past the town contained a horse farm, providing a horse stud service for the area, some of the horse studs being very expensive. On the outskirts there is a hippodrome.

== Geography ==
Sudova Vyshnia is located about 50 km (31 mi) west of Lviv, on the highway M 11 (Shehyni – Lviv) and railroad to Przemyśl in Poland. The city is also the terminus of route P40, that stretches all the way to Rava-Ruska.

The Vishnya river flows through the town in a westerly direction, eventually joining the San in Poland. The railway line (twin track) leads to Kraków and Silesia in Poland, a main route for carrying coal to the former USSR.

== History ==
Sudova Vyshnia was first mentioned in the Galician–Volhynian Chronicle for 1230 as Vyshnia. In 1340, together with the entirety of Red Ruthenia, it was annexed by the Kingdom of Poland. Until the 1772 Partitions of Poland, Sądowa Wisznia, as it was officially called, was part of Przemyśl Land, Ruthenian Voivodeship.

Sudova Vyshnia received its Magdeburg rights town charter in 1368. Originally, it was called Vyshnia (Wisznia), after the river Wisznia, a tributary of the San. The adjective Sudova (Polish: Sądowa) was added in 1545, when it became the seat of the general sejmiks of the Ruthenian szlachta of Lesser Poland Province of the Polish Crown.

In 1772, the town was annexed by the Habsburg Empire, as part of Habsburg Austrian Galicia, where it remained until late 1918. In the Second Polish Republic, Sądowa Wisznia belonged to Mościska County, Lwów Voivodeship. During the September 1939 Invasion of Poland, the Battle of Jaworów took place in the area of the town.

When captured by the USSR in the Second World War, the town had a large main square, cobbled and with a podium – suitable for public meetings. Under Communism, the square was planted over by trees and bushes – no more public meetings. In 1940–1941 and 1944–1959 Sudova Vyshnia was a district seat of the Sudova Vyshnia Raion that eventually was merged with Mostyska Raion.

When under the administration of Nazi Germany during the Second World War, being in the area called Galicia since ancient times, it was not considered occupied but a part of the German Reich. The currency at that time was the Reichsmark, whereas in occupied territories the German administration used the Ostmark. German armed forces included a number of SS divisions, considered elite units; there was also an SS Galicia division. Before the war the town had had a Jewish population; only three of its Jews survived the war (two of whom are Frieda Stramer and her brother Dov Stramer), and none remained there afterwards.

After World War II, the Soviet regime used a Catholic church (Church of St Mary) that existed since the 14th century as a warehouse until 1989.

Today, Sudova Vyshnia is one of the centers of the Poles in Ukraine, with a local office of the Association of Polish Culture of the Lviv Land.

Until 18 July 2020, Sudova Vyshnia belonged to Mostyska Raion. The raion was abolished in July 2020 as part of the administrative reform of Ukraine, which reduced the number of raions of Lviv Oblast to seven. The area of Mostyska Raion was merged into Yavoriv Raion.

== Notable people ==
=== Born ===
- Ivan Vyshenskyi (1550–1620), an Eastern Orthodox monk
- Yevhen Nakhlik (born 1956), Ukrainian literary critic
- Stefan Czmil (1914–1978), an Eastern Catholic bishop
- Bohdan Shust (born 1986), a professional football player
- Jakub Schulz (1846-1915), Jewish businessman and father of the writer and illustrator Bruno Schulz

=== Resided ===
- Jan Szczęsny Herburt (1567–1616), Polish magnate, one of the leaders of Sandomierz rokosz
- Jan Mars (1853–1924), an owner of Sudova Vyshnia
- Marcin Krowicki (1501–1573), a priest who converted from Catholicism to Unitarianism

== Gallery ==
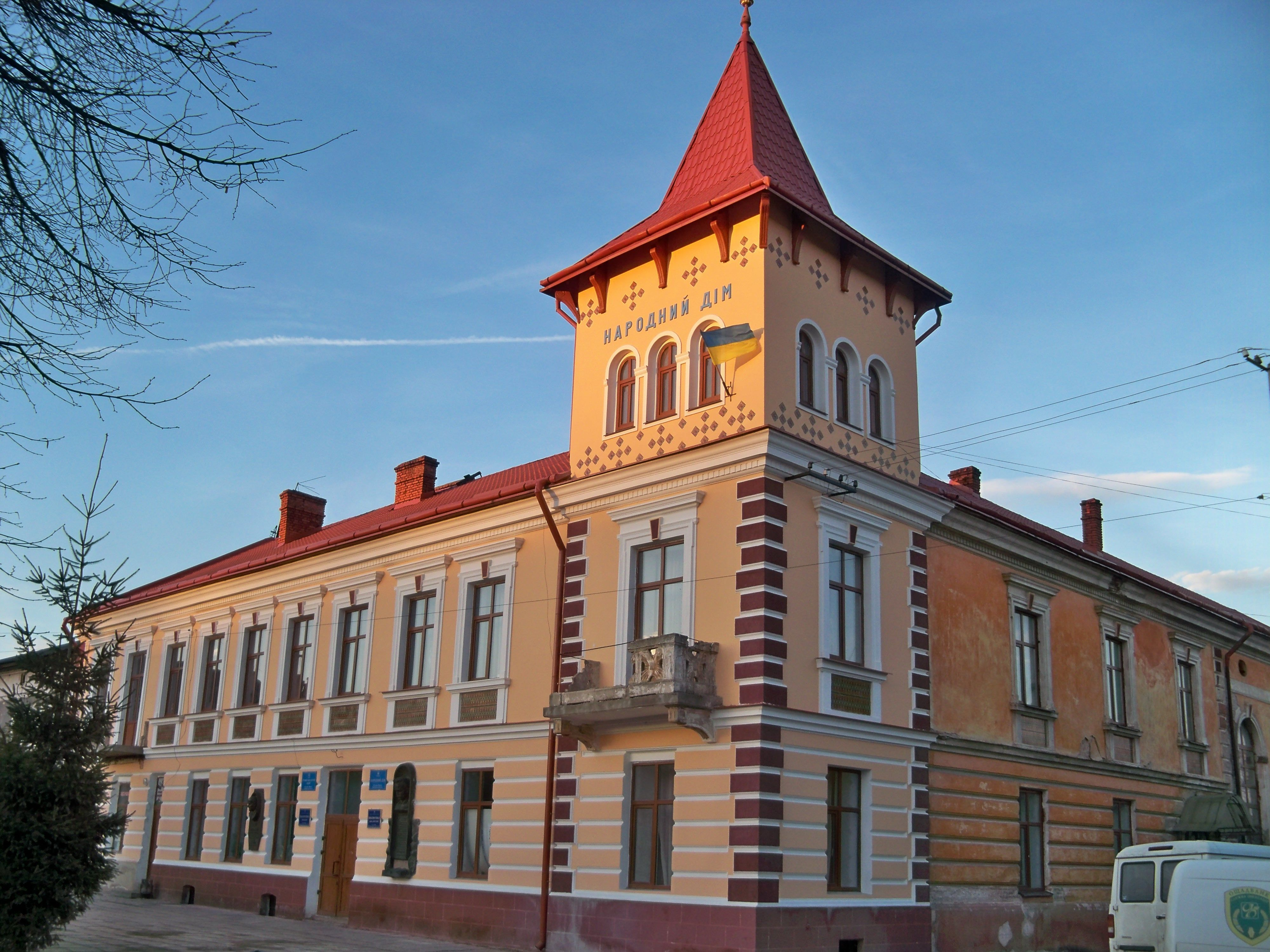
People's House in Sudova Vyshnia

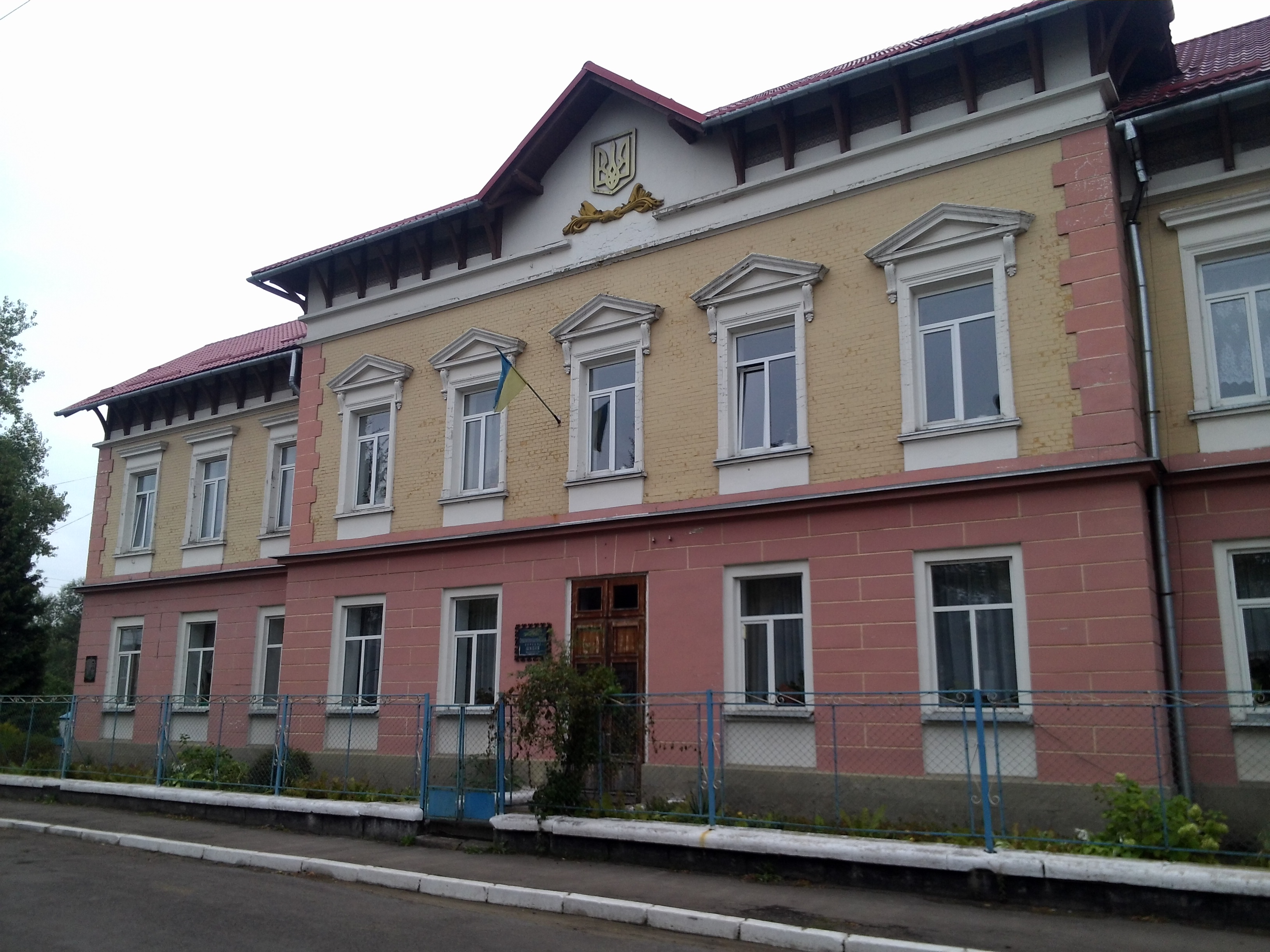
Sudova Vyshnia school

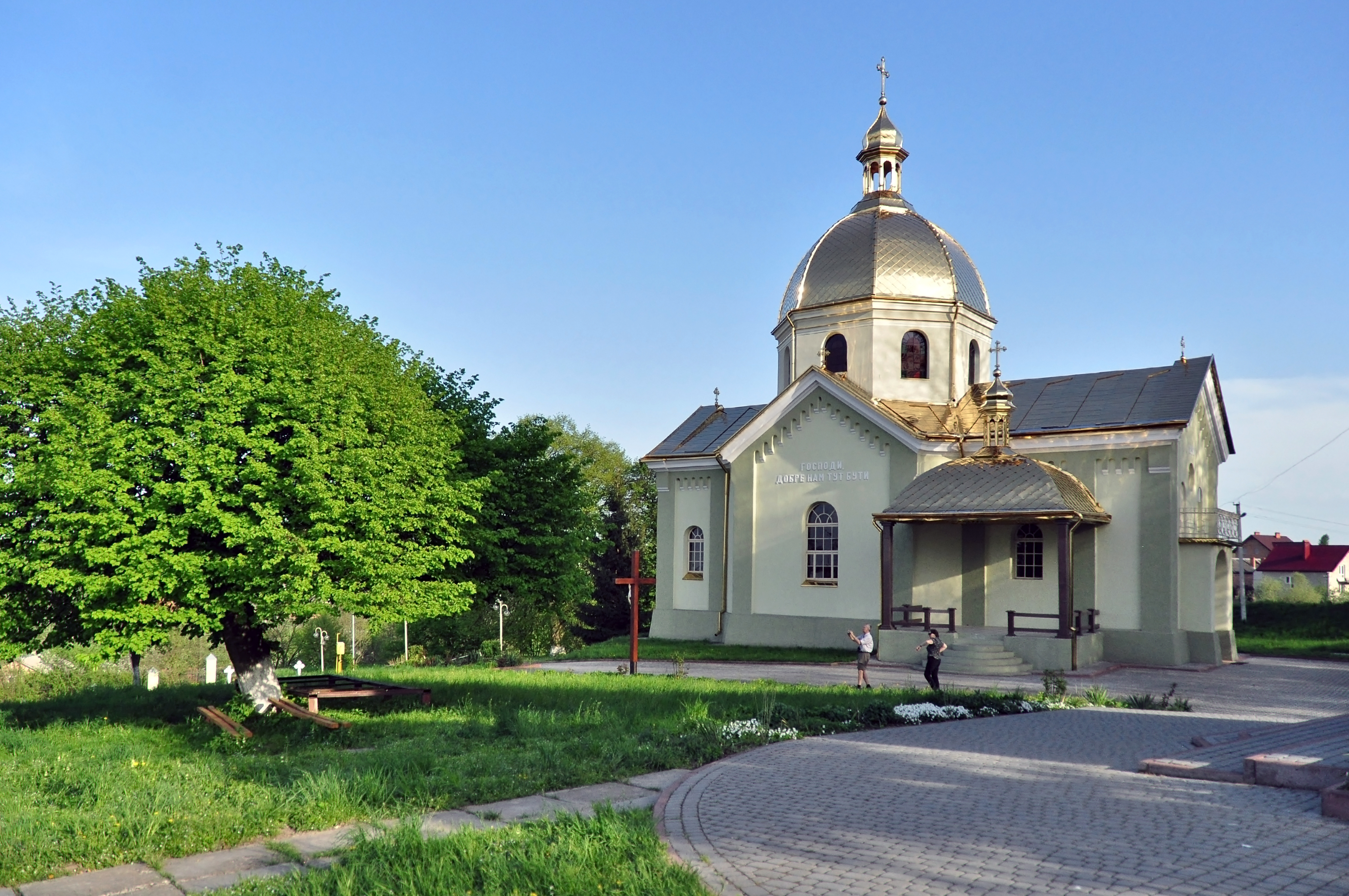
City's oldest church, Transfiguration Church

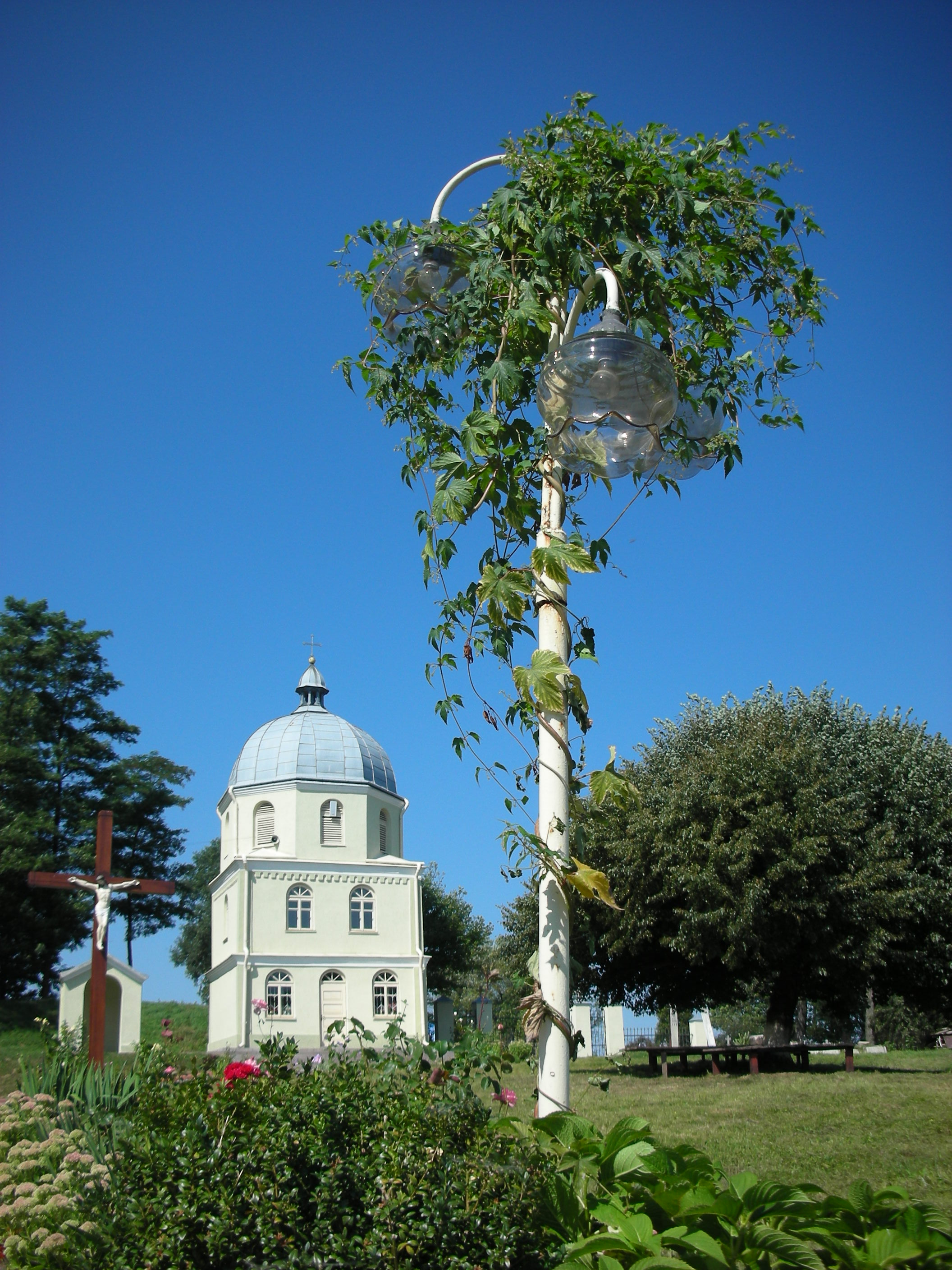
Transfiguration Church Bell Tower

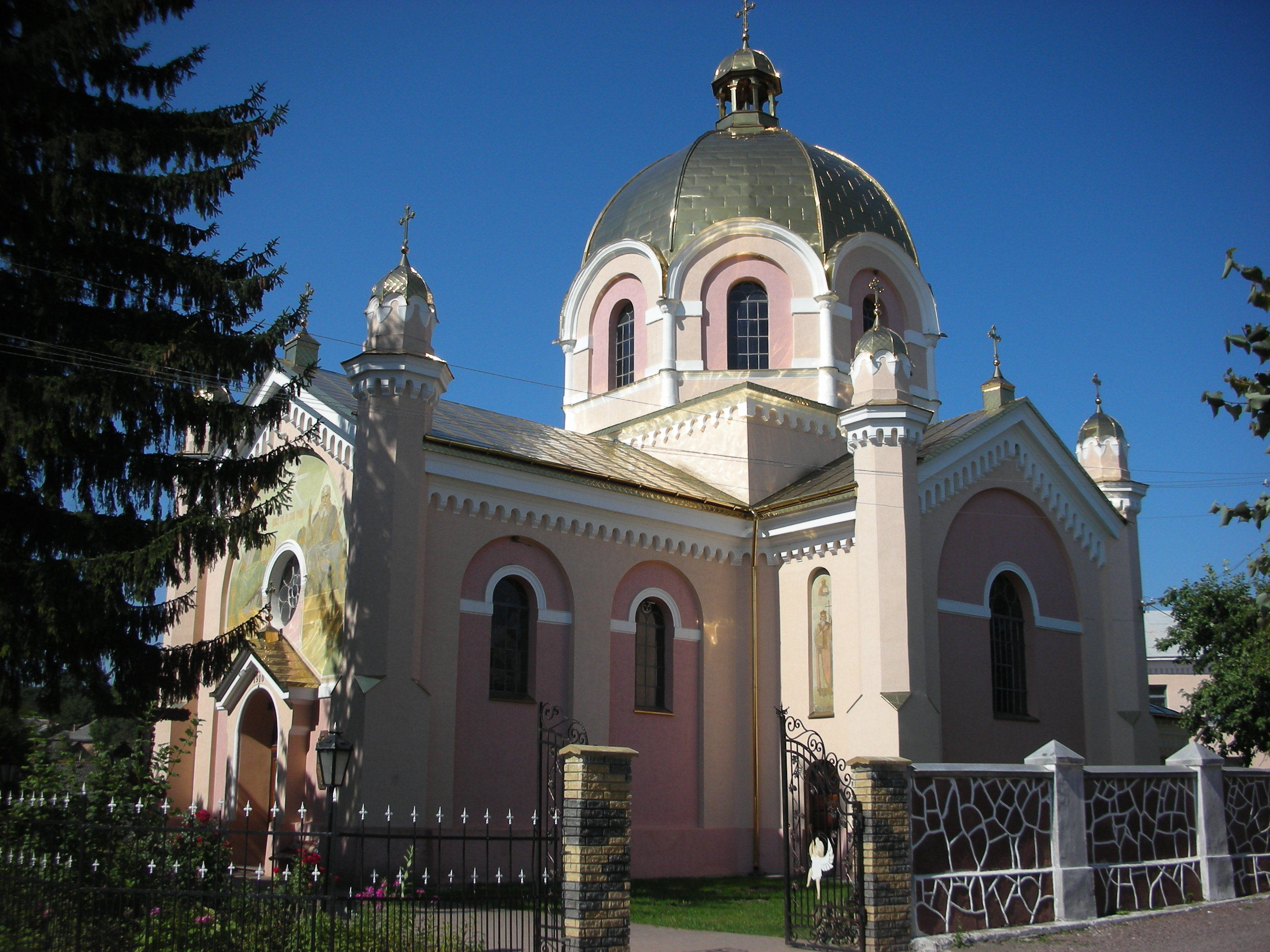
Holy Trinity Church

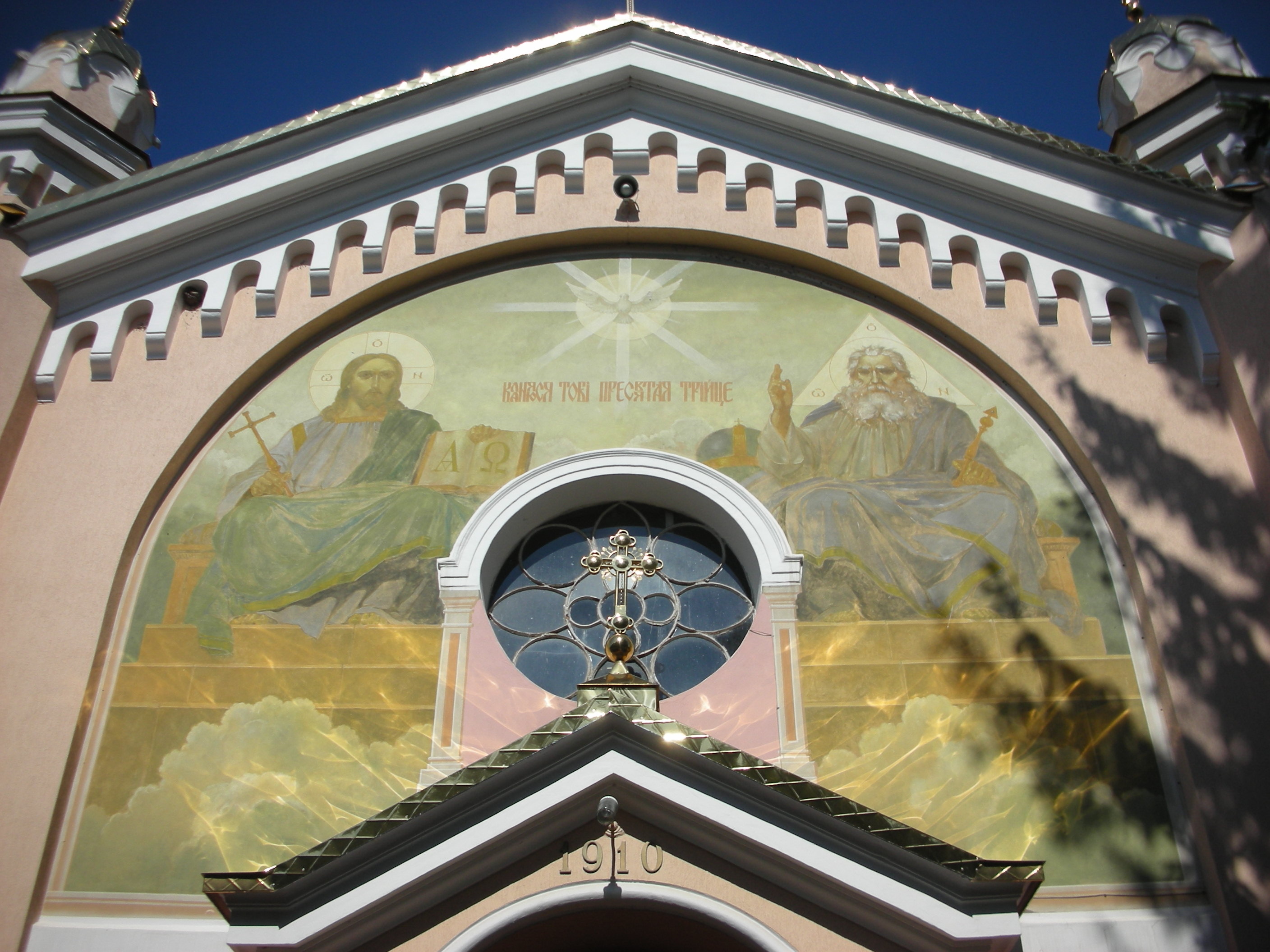
Holy Trinity Church, entrance fresco

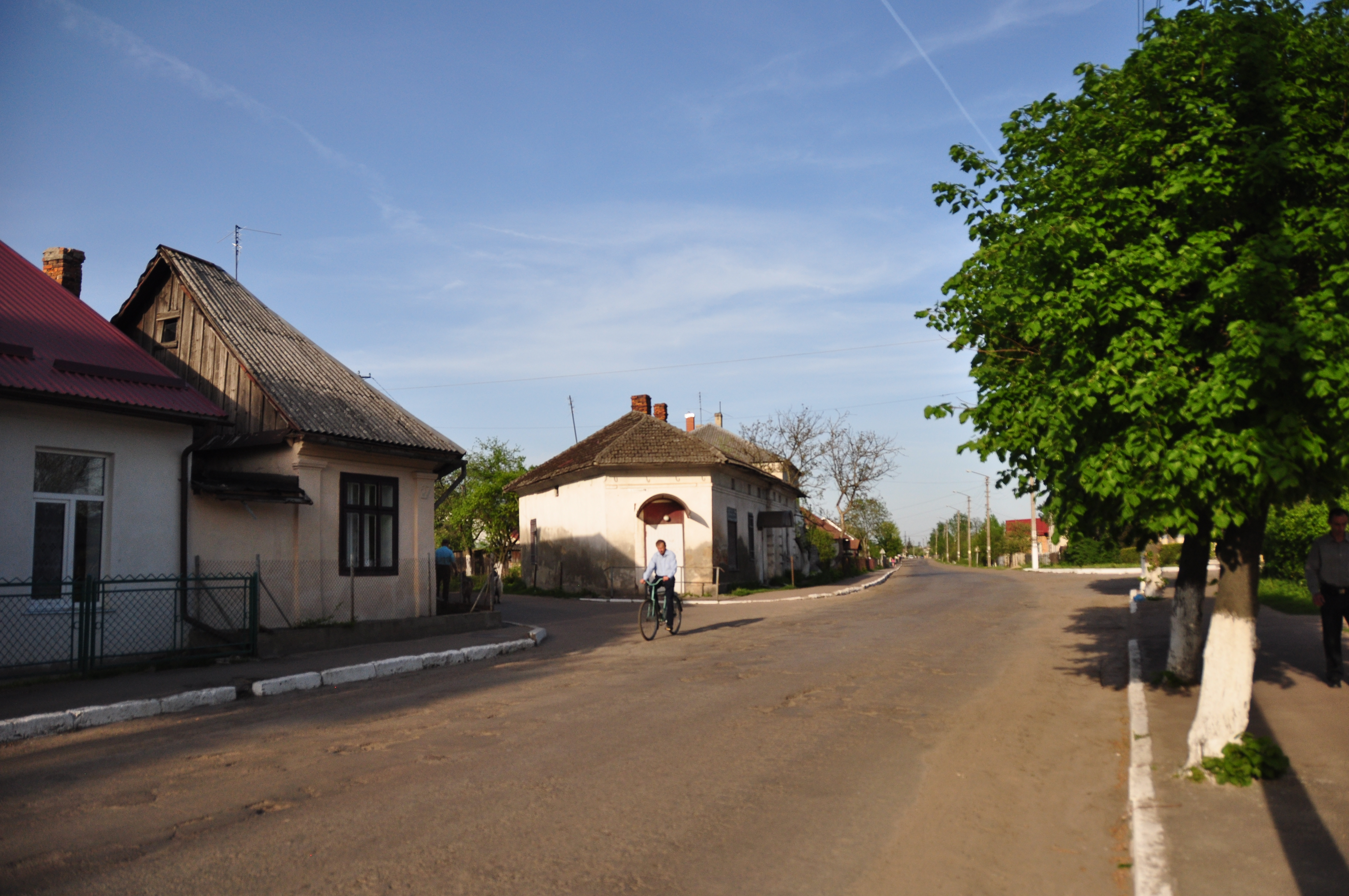
a street view

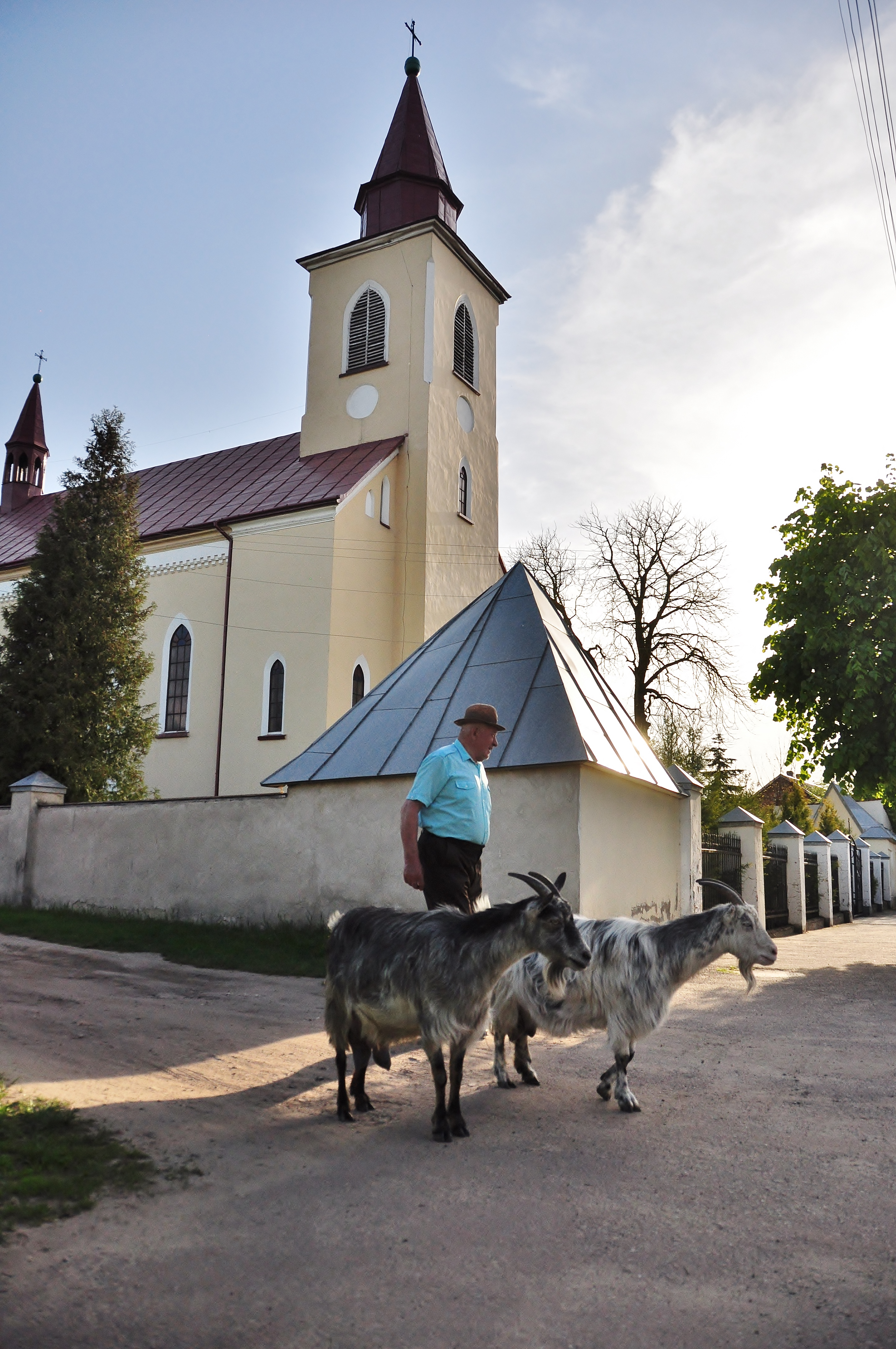
Church of St Mary, a Helper of Christians
