= Holy Trinity Church, Zhovkva =

Zhovkva-Tserkva of the Holy Trinity
UNESCO World Heritage Site
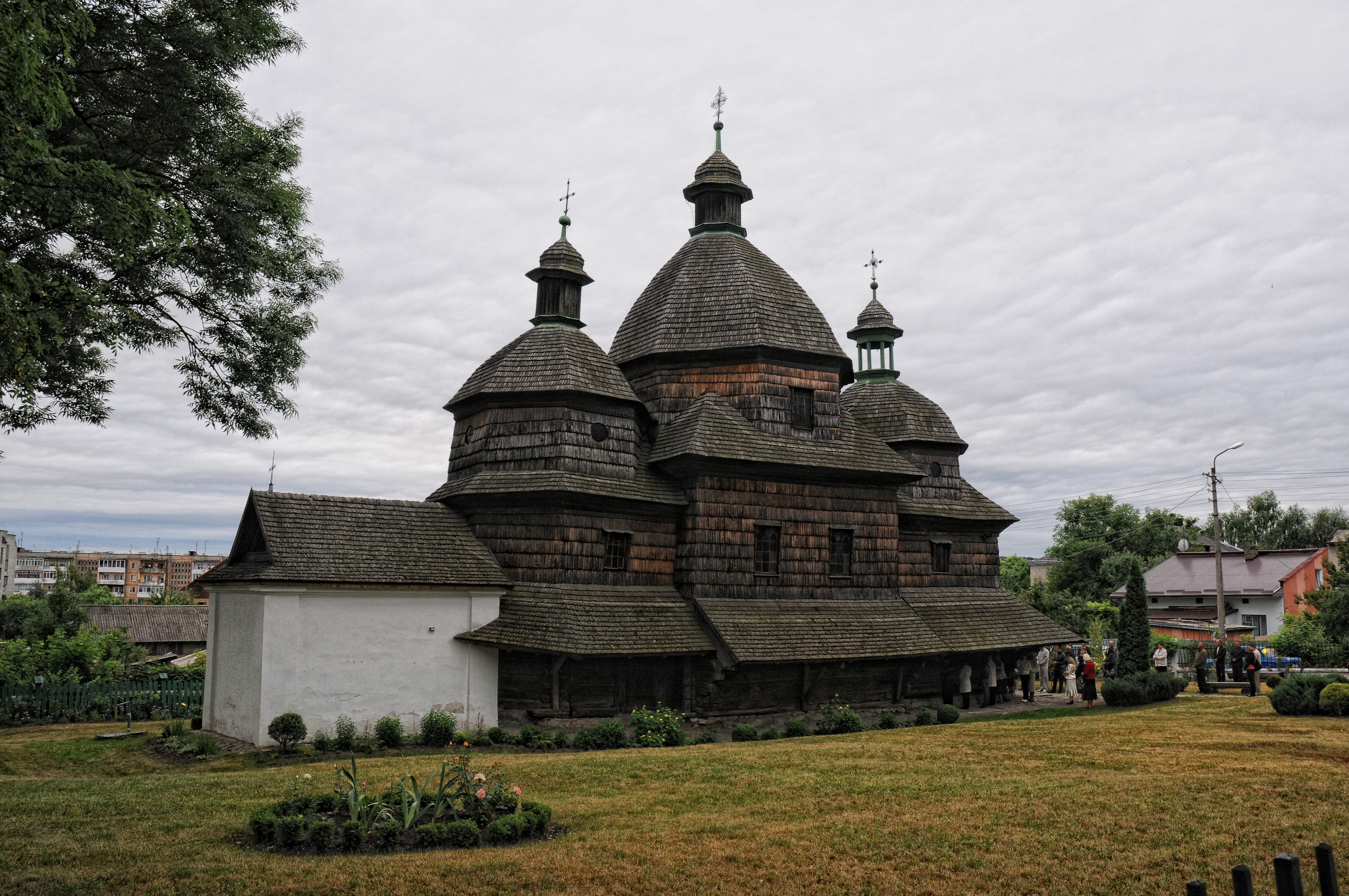

- Location within Lviv Oblast Location within Ukraine
- Location: Zhovkva, Lviv Raion, Lviv Oblast, Ukraine
- Part of: Wooden Tserkvas of the Carpathian Region in Poland and Ukraine
- Criteria: Cultural: (iii), (iv)
- Reference: 1424-016
- Inscription: 2013 (37th Session)
- Area: 0.25 ha (0.62 acres)
- Buffer zone: 1.06 ha (2.6 acres)
- Coordinates: 50°3′19.22″N 23°58′55.97″E

Holy Trinity Church was built in the suburb of Zhovkva, Ukraine in 1720 on the place of a church that burned down in 1717. The structure consists of three wooden naves and a brick sacristy.

There is an iconostasis consisting of about 50 icons painted by the masters of Zhovkva Painting and Carving School of Ivan Rutkovych in the beginning of 18th century. The iconostasis is made from linden wood carved by Ignatiy Stobenskyi. In 1978–79, iconostasis was restored. Now the church belongs to the Ukrainian Greek Catholic Church.

On the church's walls one can find the plates confirming that the building is an architecture monument built in 1720.

On June 21, 2013, during the 37th Session of the UNESCO World Heritage Committee in Cambodia, the Holy Trinity Church was added to the UNESCO World Heritage List among 16 Wooden tserkvas of the Carpathian Region in Poland and Ukraine.

== Gallery ==
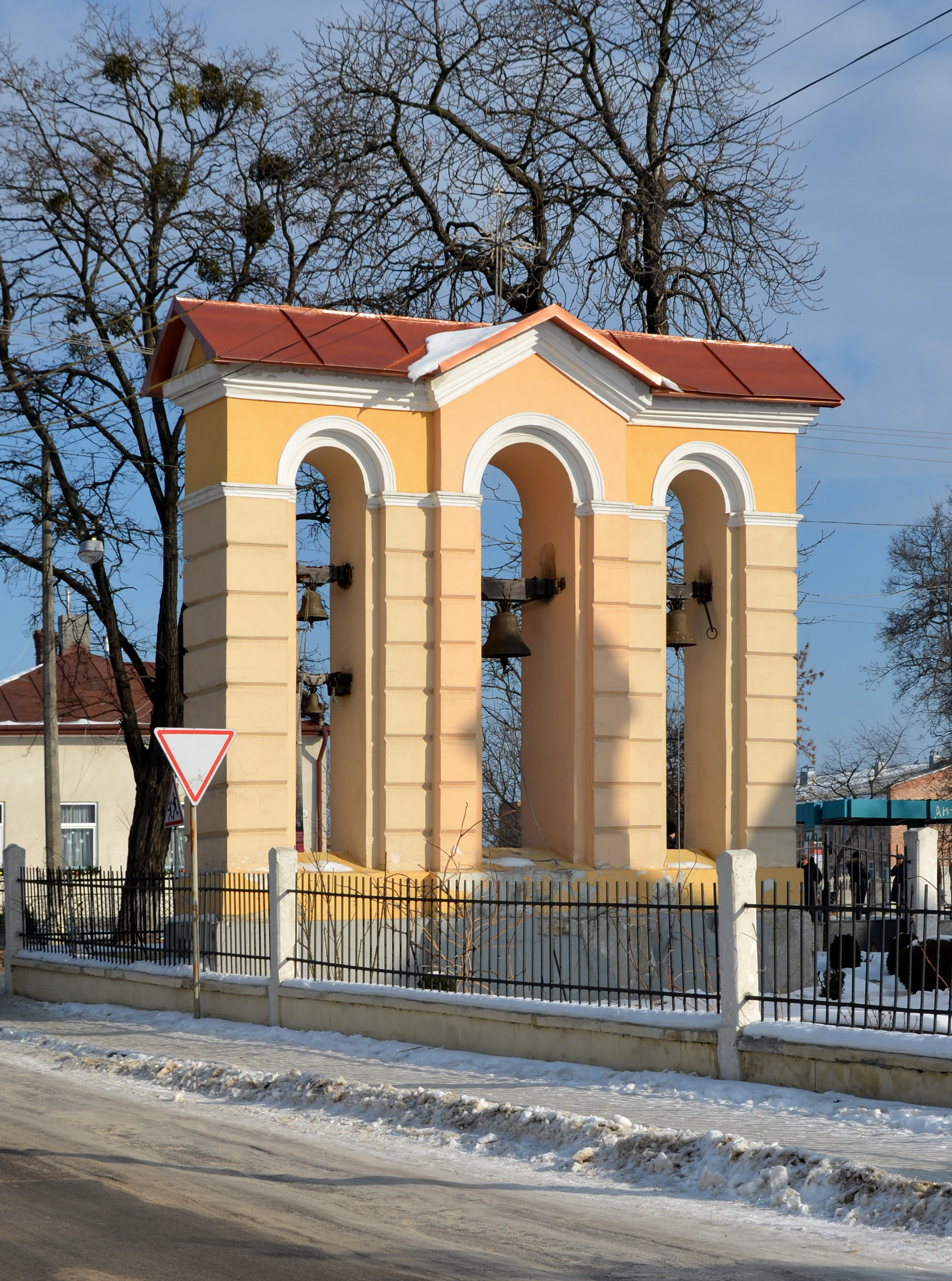
Bell tower

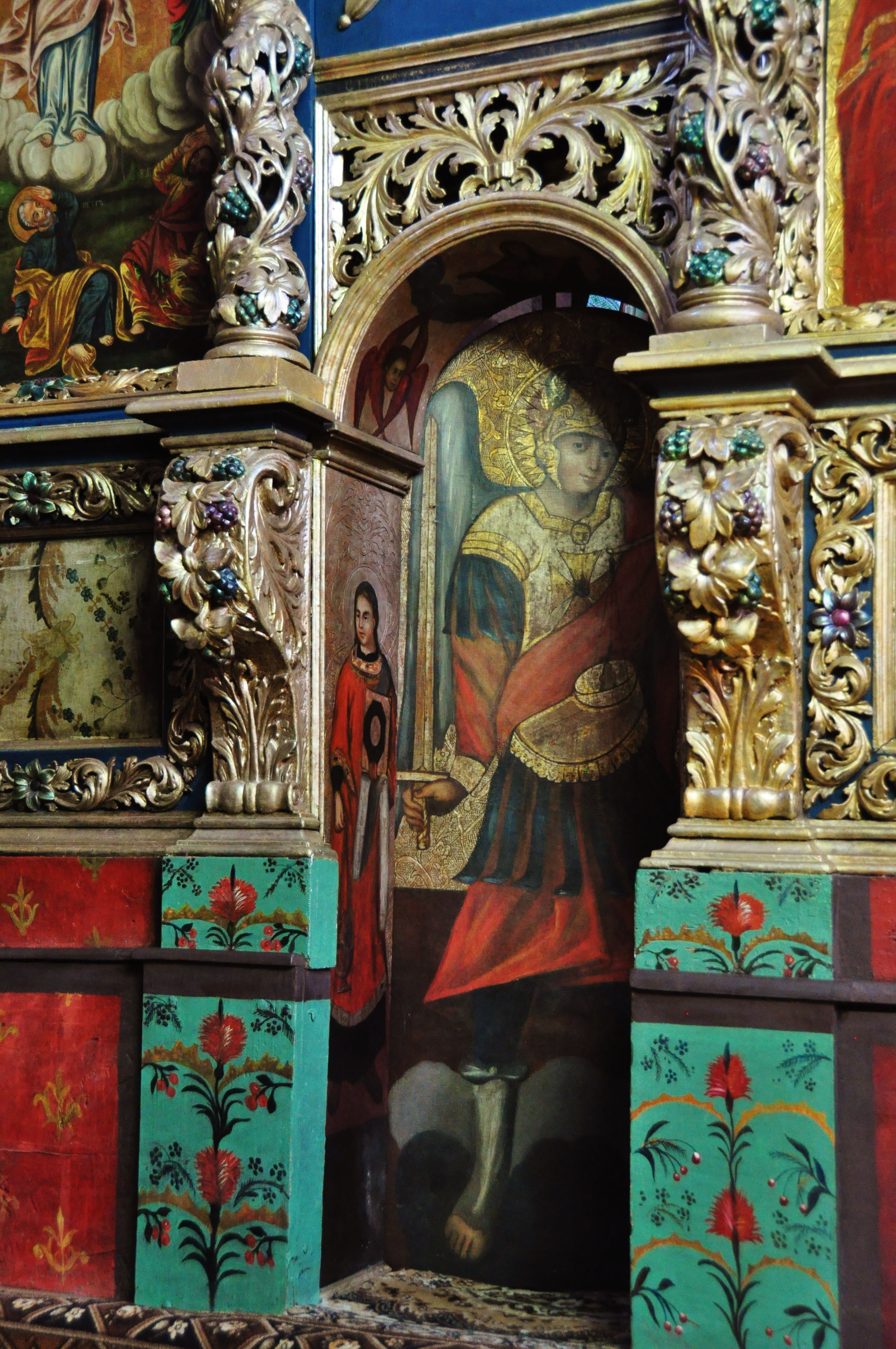
St. Michael Icon

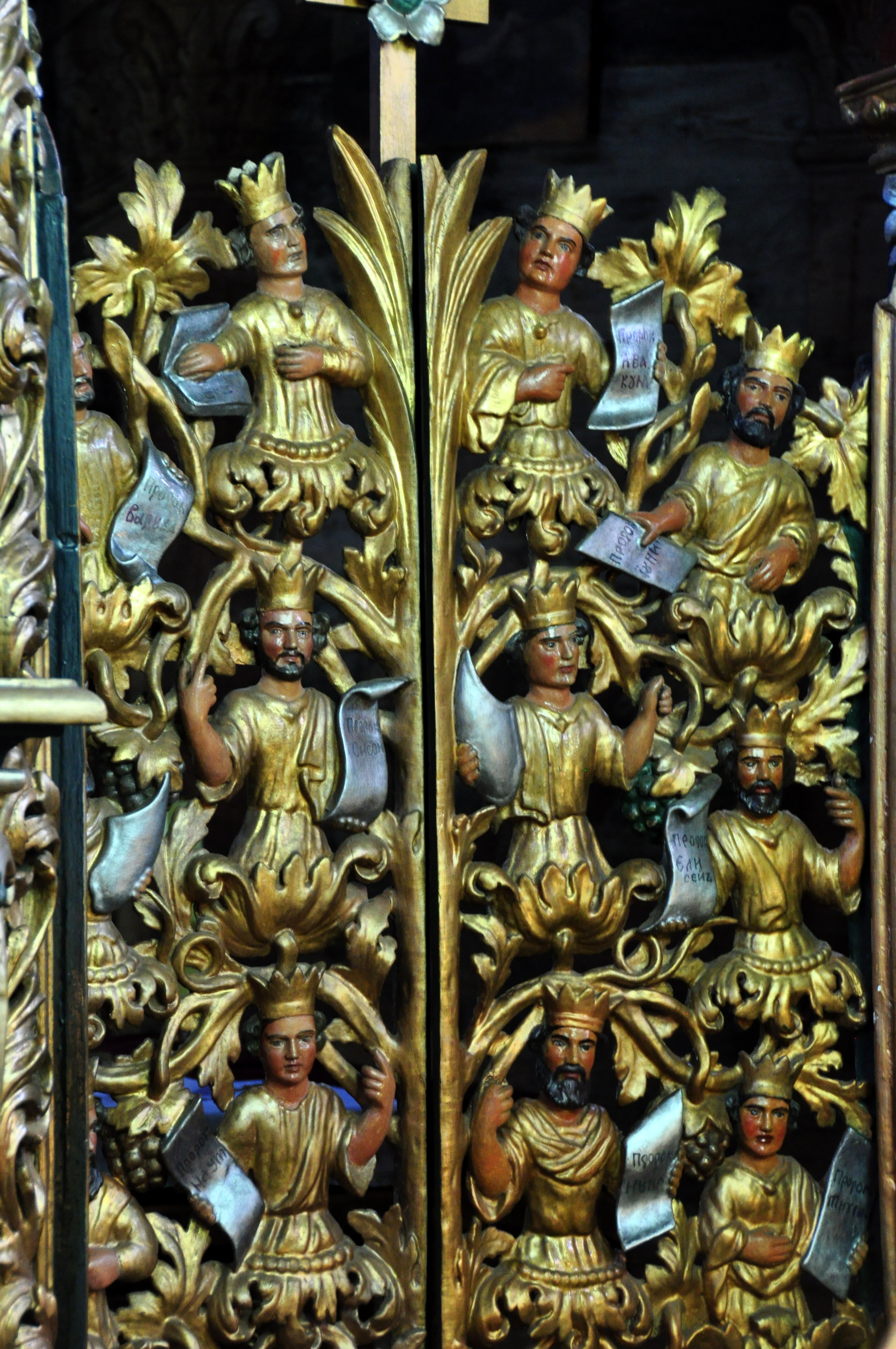
Holy Doors

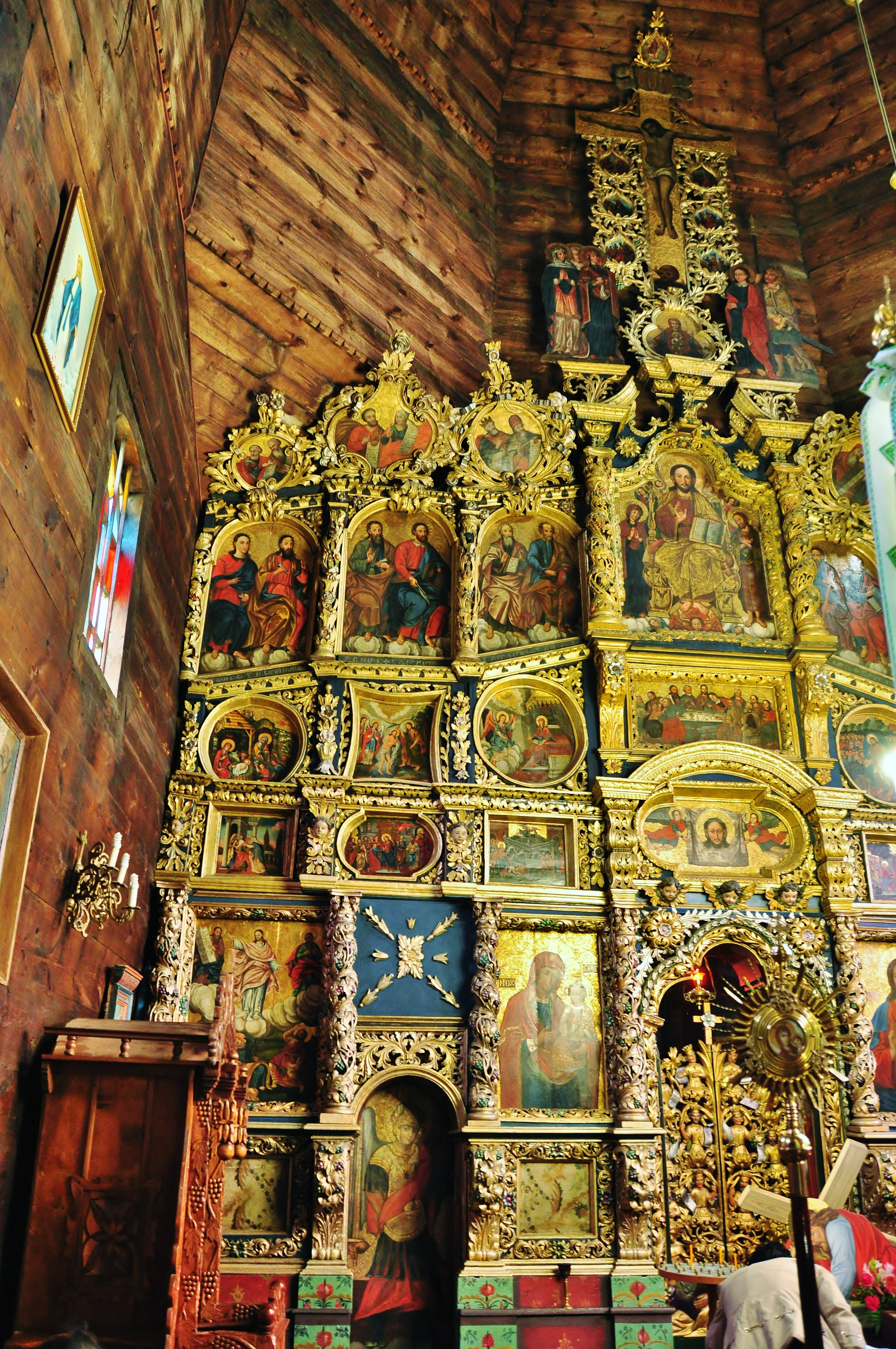
Iconostasis

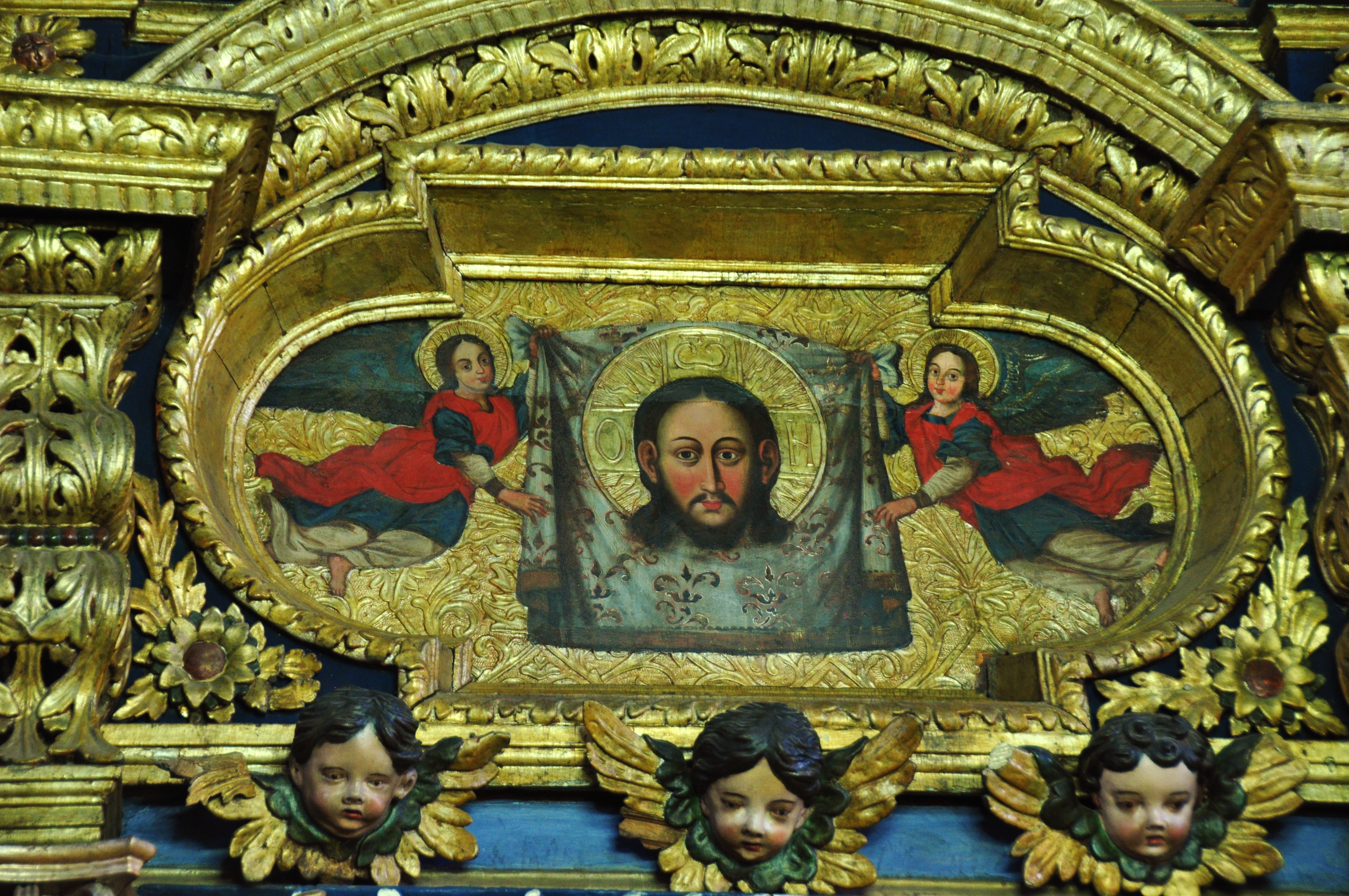
Mandylion

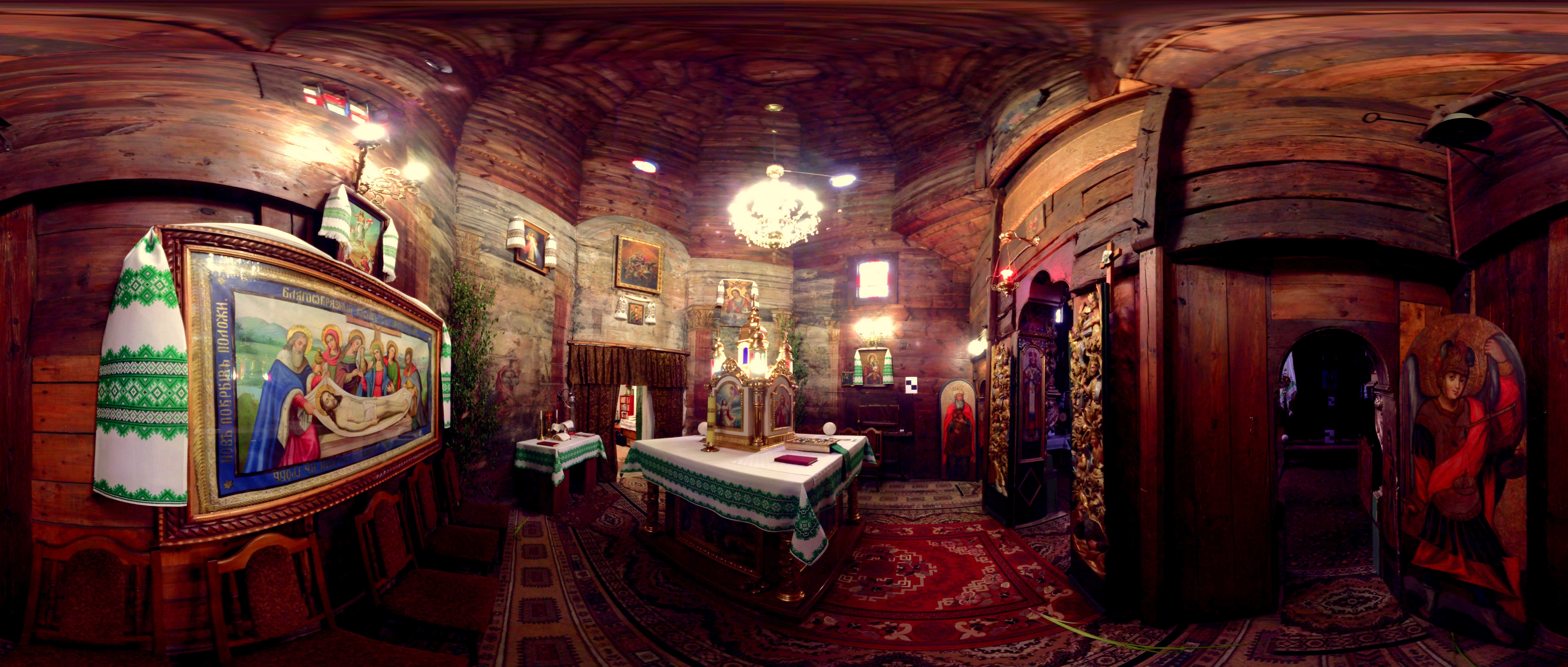
Panorama of the interior

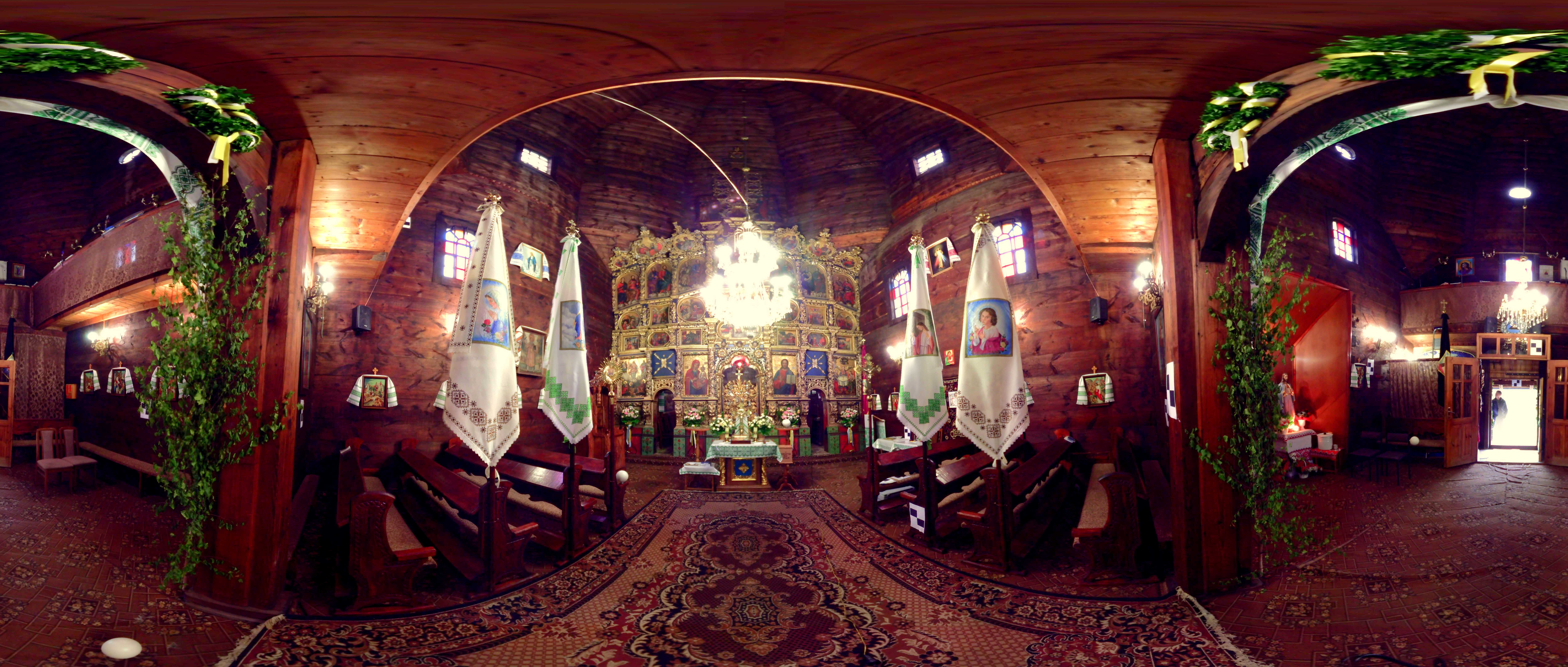
