= Sudova Vyshnia urban hromada =

Urban hromada in Lviv Oblast, Ukraine

Sudova Vyshnia urban hromada Судововишнянська міська громада
- Hromada
- Interactive map of Sudova Vyshnia urban hromada
- Coordinates: 49°47′21″N 23°22′20″E
- Country: Ukraine
- Oblast: Lviv Oblast
- Raion: Yavoriv
- Founded: 8 September 2016; 10 years ago
- Admin. center: Sudova Vyshnia

Area
  - Total: 142.7 km^{2} (55.1 sq mi)
- Elevation: 257 m (843 ft)

Population (2021)
  - Total: 12,776
  - Density: 89.53/km^{2} (231.9/sq mi)
- CATOTTG code: UA46140070000010135
- Settlements: 19
- Cities: 1
- Villages: 18

Sudova Vyshnia urban territorial hromada (Ukrainian: Судововишнянська міська територіальна громада, romanized: Sudovovyshnyanska miska terytorialna hromada) is an urban hromada (municipality) in Ukraine, situated in the western Lviv Oblast. Its administrative centre is the city of Sudova Vyshnia.

Sudova Vishnia urban hromada has an area of 142.7 square kilometres (55.1 mi^{2}) and an average elevation of 257 metres (843 ft) above the sea level. It has a total population of 12,776 in 2021.

The hromada was formed on 8 September 2016 by merging the Sudovovyshnia city council with the Dmytrovytrkyi and Dovhomostiskyi village councils of the Mostyska Raion.

On 27 May 2020, the territory of the community was increased by joining two more village councils — Malomokranska and Dydyatytska.

== Composition ==
The hromada includes the city (Sudova Vyshnia) and 18 villages:

- Dovhomostyska starosta okruh (eldership):
  1. Bortiatyn
  2. Dovhomostyska
  3. Kniazhyi Mist
  4. Novosiltsi
- Dmytrovychi starosta okruh (eldership):
  1. Dmytrovychi
  2. Volostkiv
  3. Zahorody
  4. Zarichchia
- Dydiatychi starosta okruh (eldership):
  1. Dydiatychi
  2. Kulmatychi
  3. Mala Dibrova
  4. Velyka Dibrova
  5. Vovchyshchovychi
- Mokriany starosta okruh (eldership):
  1. Bertsi
  2. Makuniv
  3. Mali Mokriany
  4. Shyshorovychi
  5. Velyki Mokriany
