= Mostyska urban hromada =

Hromada in Lviv Oblast, Ukraine

Mostyska urban hromada Мостиська міська громада
- Hromada
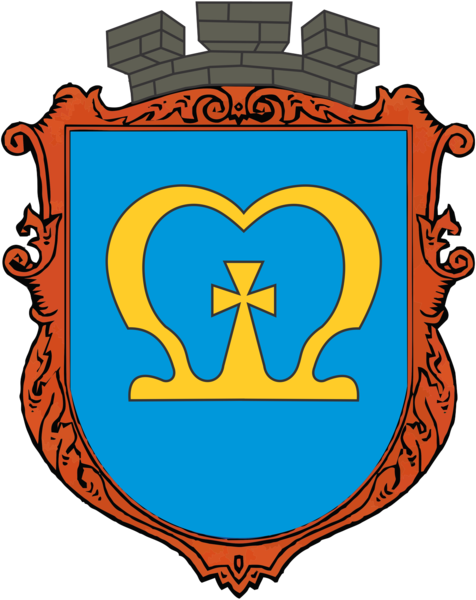
- Seal
- Interactive map of Mostyska urban hromada
- Country: Ukraine
- Oblast: Lviv Oblast
- Raion: Yavoriv Raion
- Admin. center: Mostyska

Area
  - Total: 4,366 km^{2} (1,686 sq mi)

Population (2021)
  - Total: 32,055
  - Density: 7.342/km^{2} (19.02/sq mi)
- CATOTTG code: UA46140030000023506
- Settlements: 63
- Cities: 1
- Villages: 62
- Website: mostyska-gromada.gov.ua

Mostyska urban hromada (Ukrainian: Мостиська міська громада) is a hromada in Ukraine, in Yavoriv Raion of Lviv Oblast. The administrative center is the city of Mostyska.

== Settlements ==
The hromada consists of 1 city (Mostyska) and 62 villages:

- Arlamivska Volia
- Berehove
- Bukhovychi
- Vyshenka
- Volia-Sadkivska
- Vuikovychi
- Hodyni
- Hostyntseve
- Doboshchivka
- Dubynky
- Zavada
- Zavadiv
- Zaverkhy
- Zaviazantsi
- Zahorby
- Zarichchia
- Kachmari
- Kniahynychi
- Kolodka
- Korolyn
- Korchunok
- Kostylnyky
- Kryviaky
- Krysovychi
- Kropylnyky
- Krukenychi
- Lypnyky
- Mazury
- Maksymtsi
- Malniv
- Malnivska Volia
- Martyny
- Meleshky
- Mystychi
- Nahirne
- Nihovychi
- Ostrozhets
- Petyky
- Pykhy
- Pidhat
- Pidlisky
- Pisok
- Pnikut
- Radenychi
- Rozhaky
- Sannyky
- Slabash
- Sokolia
- Soltysy
- Stariava
- Stoiantsi
- Striletske
- Sudkovychi
- Tvirzha
- Topilnytsia
- Khatky
- Khlypli
- Khorosnytsia
- Cherneve
- Chyzhevychi
- Chyshky
- Yatviahy
