= Mostyska Raion =

Former subdivision of Lviv Oblast, Ukraine

Mostyska Raion Мостиський район
- Raion
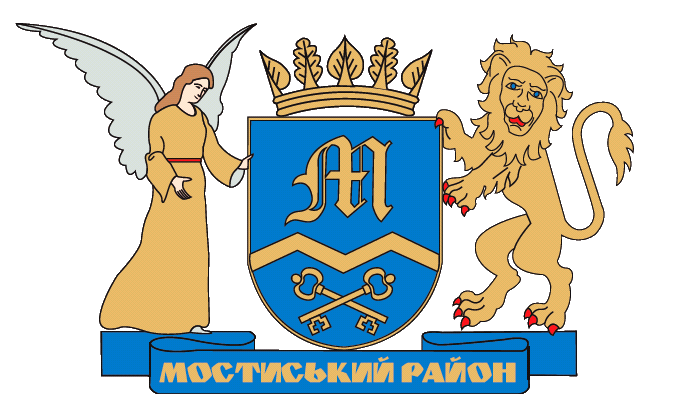
- Flag Coat of arms

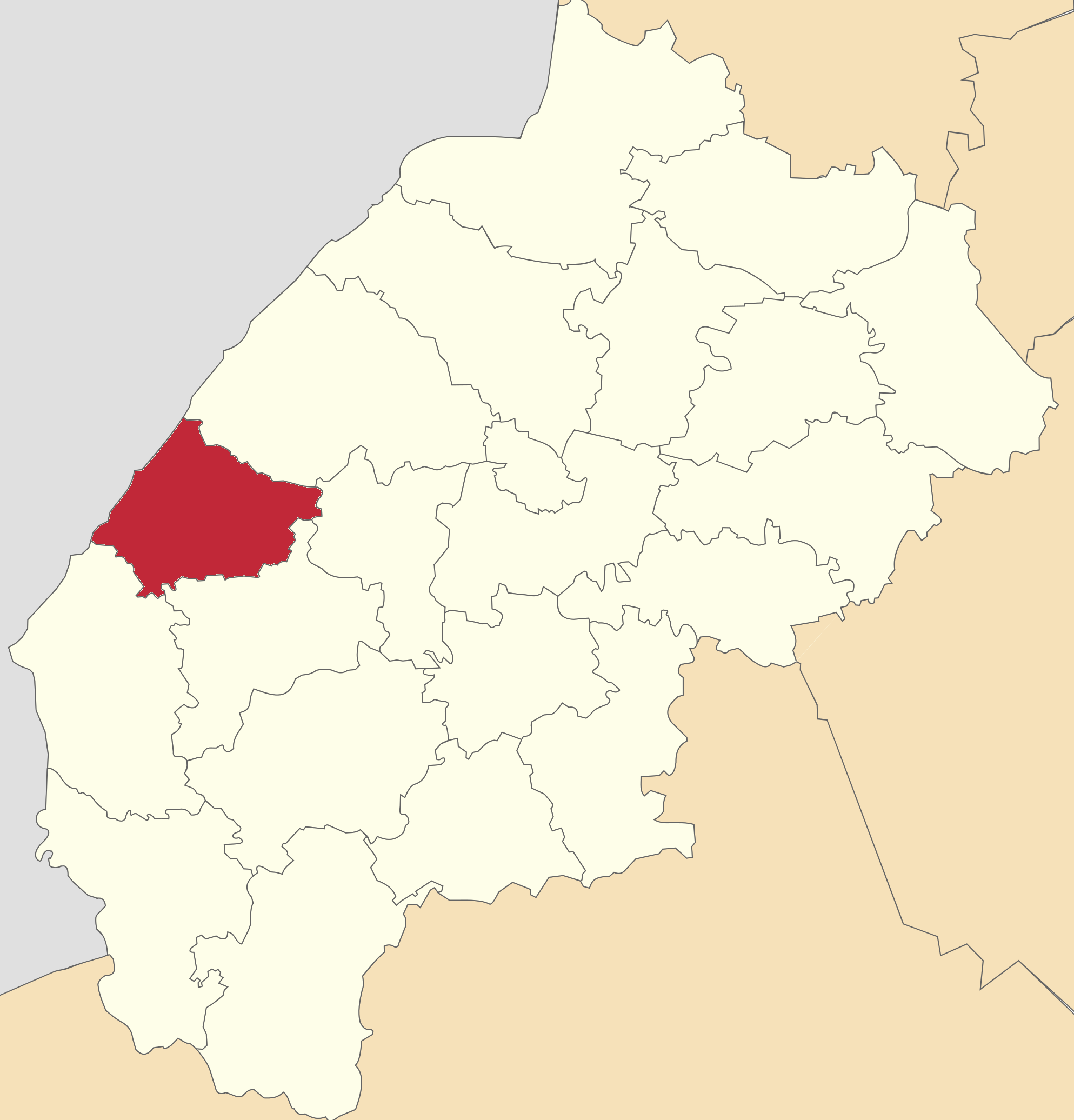
- Coordinates: 49°45′41″N 23°9′7″E
- Country: Ukraine
- Region: Lviv Oblast
- Established: 1939
- Disestablished: 18 July 2020
- Admin. center: Mostyska
- Subdivisions: List: — city councils; — settlement councils; — rural councils; Number of localities: — cities; — urban-type settlements; 110 — villages; — rural settlements

Area
  - Total: 845 km^{2} (326 sq mi)

Population (2020)
  - Total: 56,206
  - Density: 66.5/km^{2} (172/sq mi)
- Time zone: UTC+02:00 (EET)
  - Summer (DST): UTC+03:00 (EEST)
- Postal index: 81300—81385
- Area code: 380-3234
- Website: http://mostyska-rda.gov.ua/ Mostyskyi Raion

Mostyska Raion (Ukrainian: Мостиський район) was a raion (district) in Lviv Oblast in western Ukraine. Its administrative center was Mostyska. The raion was abolished on 18 July 2020 as part of the administrative reform of Ukraine, which reduced the number of raions of Lviv Oblast to seven. The area of Mostyska Raion was merged into Yavoriv Raion. The last estimate of the raion population was 56,206 (2020 est.).

It was established in 1939 along with the entire Lviv Oblast following the Soviet invasion of Poland.

At the time of disestablishment, the raion consisted of three hromadas:

- Mostyska urban hromada with the administration in Mostyska;
- Shehyni rural hromada with the administration in the selo of Shehyni;
- Sudova Vyshnia urban hromada with the administration in the city of Sudova Vyshnia.

== See also ==
- Administrative divisions of Lviv Oblast
