= Mostyska =

City in Lviv Oblast, Ukraine

Mostyska Мостиська Mościska
- City
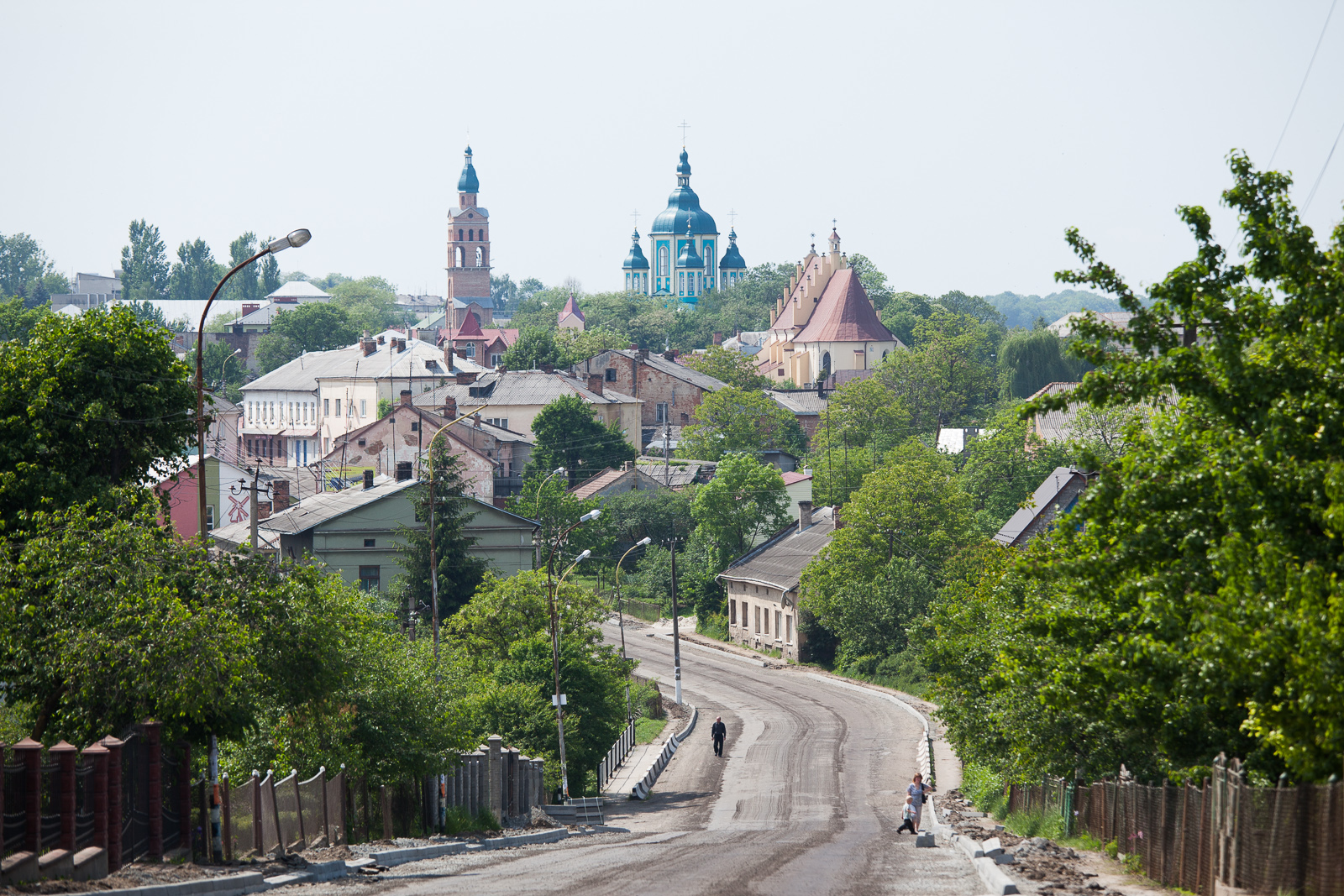
- Skyline of Mostyska

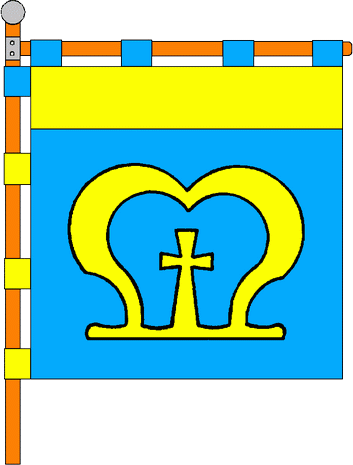
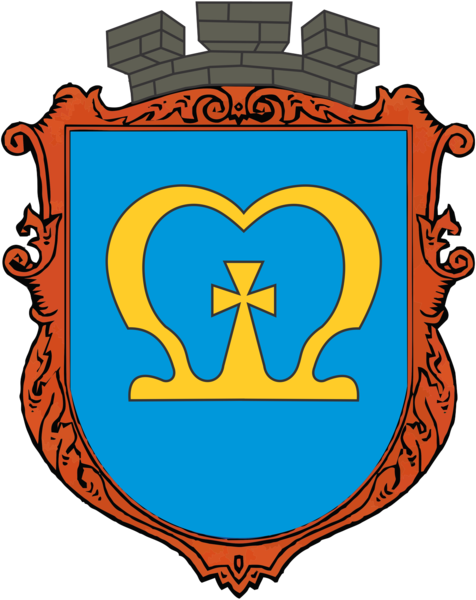
- Flag Coat of arms
- Interactive map of Mostyska
- Location in Lviv Oblast Location in Ukraine
- Coordinates: 49°47′39″N 23°09′09″E
- Country: Ukraine
- Oblast: Lviv Oblast
- Raion: Yavoriv Raion
- Hromada: Mostyska urban hromada
- Magdeburg rights: 1404

Population (2024)
  - Total: 9 044
- Time zone: UTC+2 (EET)
  - Summer (DST): UTC+3 (EEST)

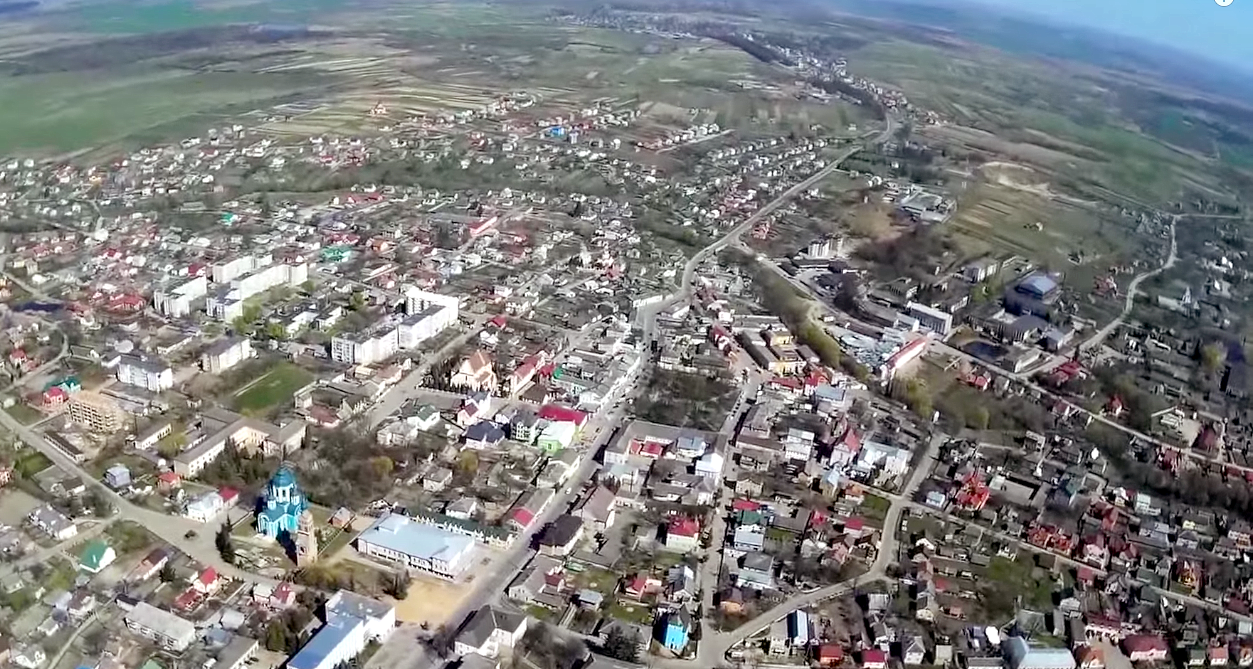
Aerial photo

Mostyska (Ukrainian: Мостиська [moˈstɪsʲkɐ]; Polish: Mościska, both in the pl. form), is a city in Yavoriv Raion, Lviv Oblast (region) of Ukraine. It hosts the administration of Mostyska urban hromada, one of the hromadas of Ukraine. The city is located in western portion of Sian Lowland near the border with Poland (14 km (8.7 mi)).

== History ==
The names Mościska and Mostyska share a common etymological Slavic root "most", which means "bridge", or the place associated with "river crossings". In 1340, Mostyska, together with the territory of Red Ruthenia, was annexed by Polish King Kazimierz Wielki, and the town remained in Poland for over 400 years, until 1772 (see Partitions of Poland). Mościska, as it was called, was in the Przemyśl region, and the Ruthenian Voivodeship. In 1404, King Wladyslaw Jagiello granted it a Magdeburg town charter. Mościska was the seat of a starosta, and the town was severely damaged several times destroyed during Tatar, Turkish and Wallachian raids.

In the mid-18th century, the town's population consisted of 62% Roman Catholics, 25% Jews, and 12% Greek Catholics. In the late 18th century, when it was part of Austrian Galicia, the population of Mościska was 2,200, with a large Jewish minority. During the Second Polish Republic, Mościska was a county seat in Lwow Voivodeship, with its population reaching 5,000.

During the Invasion of Poland in late September 1939, Mościska was seized by the Red Army. Thousands of its ethnic Polish population were sent to Siberia. In June 1941, the town was captured by the Wehrmacht, and the city remained under German control until July 1944. In the autumn of 1945, the deportation, or so-called "repatriation", of Poles began (see Polish population transfers (1944–46)), which lasted until 1948. As a result, most ethnic Poles were forced out of the town, together with monks from the foundation monastery of the Redemptorist fathers. This was the redemptorists' "Mother house", which had been re-established in Poland for a third time in 1883 following the order's expulsion by Napoleon in 1809. Most of the priests left in the summer 1946, taking with them the holy icon and everything they were allowed to carry with them, including sculptures and clothes. Those who remained were arrested in May 1948 by the NKVD, and two of the priests sent to Siberia. Afterwards, the complex of the monastery was turned into a warehouse. Currently, it serves as a hospital.

Today, Mostyska is one of main centres of the Polish minority in Ukraine. In 1989, a regional office of the Association of Polish Culture of the Lviv Land was opened. At present Poles make up 36% of population. In 2002, a Polish-language middle school was opened with 250 students.

Until 18 July 2020, Mostyska was the administrative center of Mostyska Raion. As part of the administrative reforms of Ukraine, which reduced the number of raions of Lviv Oblast to seven, this raion was abolished in July 2020 and its area was merged with Yavoriv Raion.

== Demographics ==
According to the 2001 Ukrainian census, Mostyska had a population of 9,044 inhabitants, which includes the highest percentage of ethnic Poles in any major settlement in the region. The exact ethnic composition was as follows:

Ethnic groups in Mostyska
	percent
Ukrainians	79.32%
Poles	18.84%
Russians	1.42%
Belarusians	0.18%
others	0.24%

== In popular culture ==
Mostyska is mentioned in a popular song by Ukrainian rock band Braty Hadiukiny.

== Notable people ==
- pl:Jan Legowicz, philosopher
- pl:Mikołaj z Mościsk (Nicolaus Moscicensis), mystic
- Bernard Łubieński, Redemptorist priest and preacher
- Heinrich Alfred Barb, director of the Vienna Academy and Persian scholar
- Jozef Kisielewski, writer

== See also ==
- Mostyska II
