= Isaac Barb =

Isaac Barb (Yiddish: יצחק בּארבּ, romanized: Yitsḥak Barb; 26 June 1827 – 21 February 1903) was a Galician Jewish educator, translator, and poet. He published the first Hebrew translation of Shakespeare's Macbeth in 1883, adapted from Schiller's German translation.

== Bibliography ==
- Memashel meshalim. Drohobych: A. H. Zupnik. 1897 [1861].
- "Shir le-Purim" [A Poem for Purim]. Ha-Nesher. 3 (10). Lemberg: Ha-mevaser: 42–43. March 1863.
- Shakespeare, William (1883). Makbet [Macbeth]. Drohobych: Zupnik & Knoller.
- Adam ve-Ḥava be-Gan Eden [Adam and Eve in the Garden of Eden] (PDF). Przmysl: Zupnik, Knoller & Hamerschmid. 1885. Archived from the original (PDF) on 2021-11-15.
- "Olam aḥer" [Another World]. Otzar Ha-sifrut. 2. Krakow: Josef Fischer: 224–226. 1888.
