= Verbliany, Yavoriv Raion =

Verbliany Вербляни
- Village
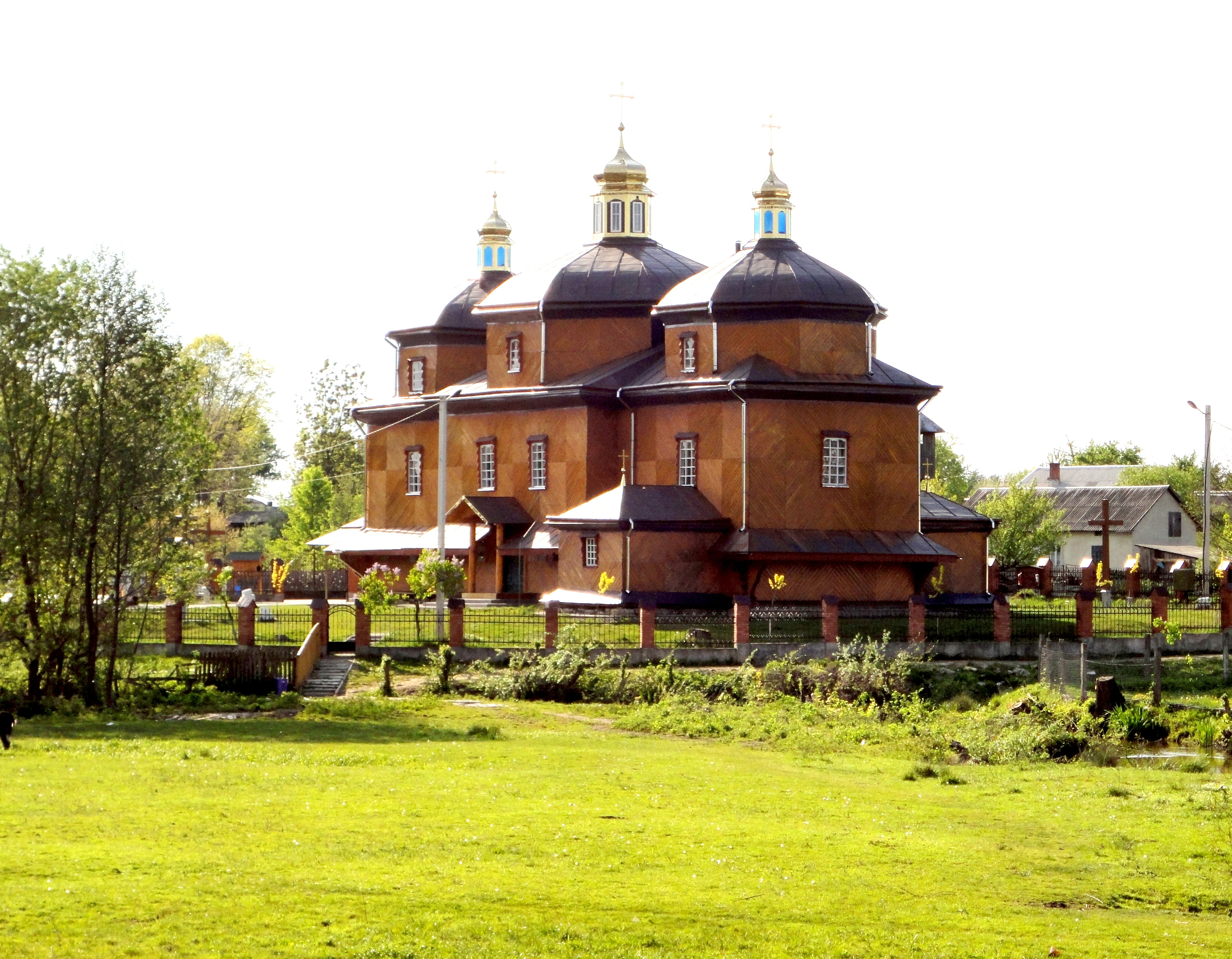
- Wooden church of Nativity of the Theotokos in Verbliany, built in the 19th century

- Location within Ukraine Location within Lviv Oblast
- Coordinates: 50°03′00″N 23°25′40″E
- Country: Ukraine
- Oblast: Lviv Oblast
- Raion: Yavoriv Raion
- Hromada: Yavoriv urban hromada
- Established: 1456
- Area: 4 km^{2} (1.5 sq mi)
- Elevation: 244 m (801 ft)
- Population (2001): 615
  - Density: 150/km^{2} (400/sq mi)
- Post code: 81017
- Area code: +380 3259

Verbliany (Ukrainian: Вербляни) is a Ukrainian village in Yavoriv Raion (district) of Lviv Oblast (province). It belongs to Yavoriv urban hromada, one of the hromadas of Ukraine. It is located 13 km (8 mi) north of Yavoriv city and 6 km (4 mi) south of Nemyriv urban-type settlement. Verbliany was founded in 1456, has an area of 4 square kilometres (2 sq mi) and an elevation of 244 metres (801 ft). According to the 2001 census, the town has a population of 615 inhabitants.
