= Koty, Yavoriv Raion =

Rural locality in Lviv Oblast, Ukraine

Koty Коти
- Village
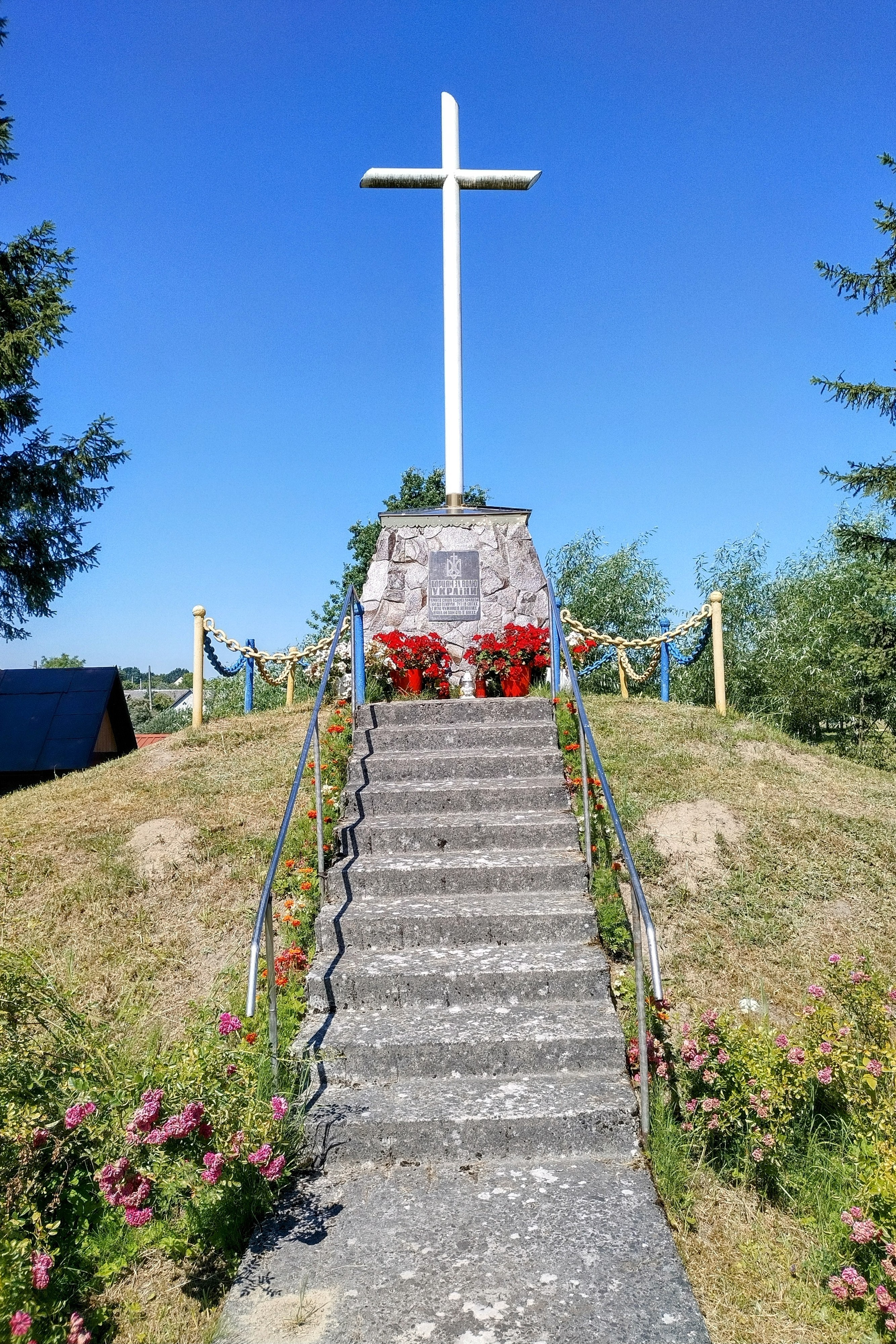
- Memorial "Fighters for the Freedom of Ukraine" in village Koty (2023)

- Location within Ukraine Location within Lviv Oblast
- Coordinates: 50°01′12″N 23°25′28″E
- Country: Ukraine
- Oblast: Lviv Oblast
- Raion: Yavoriv Raion
- Hromada: Yavoriv urban hromada
- Established: 1895
- Area: 0.909 km^{2} (0.351 sq mi)
- Elevation: 277 m (909 ft)
- Population (2001): 870
  - Density: 960/km^{2} (2,500/sq mi)
- Post code: 81019
- Area code: +380 3259

Koty (Ukrainian: Коти) is a Ukrainian village in Yavoriv Raion (district) of Lviv Oblast (province). It belongs to Yavoriv urban hromada, one of the hromadas of Ukraine. It is located 10 km (6 mi) north of Yavoriv city and 10 km south of Nemyriv urban-type settlement. Koty was founded in 1895, has an area of 0.9 square kilometres (0.3 sq mi) and an elevation of 277 metres (909 ft). According to the 2001 census, the village has a population of 870 inhabitants.

Koty is located near the Yavoriv military base. In the 1940s, the population of village increased with inhabitants from the territory of military base, which was expanded under Soviet occupation.
