= Rohizno =

Rural locality in Lviv Oblast, Ukraine

- Village
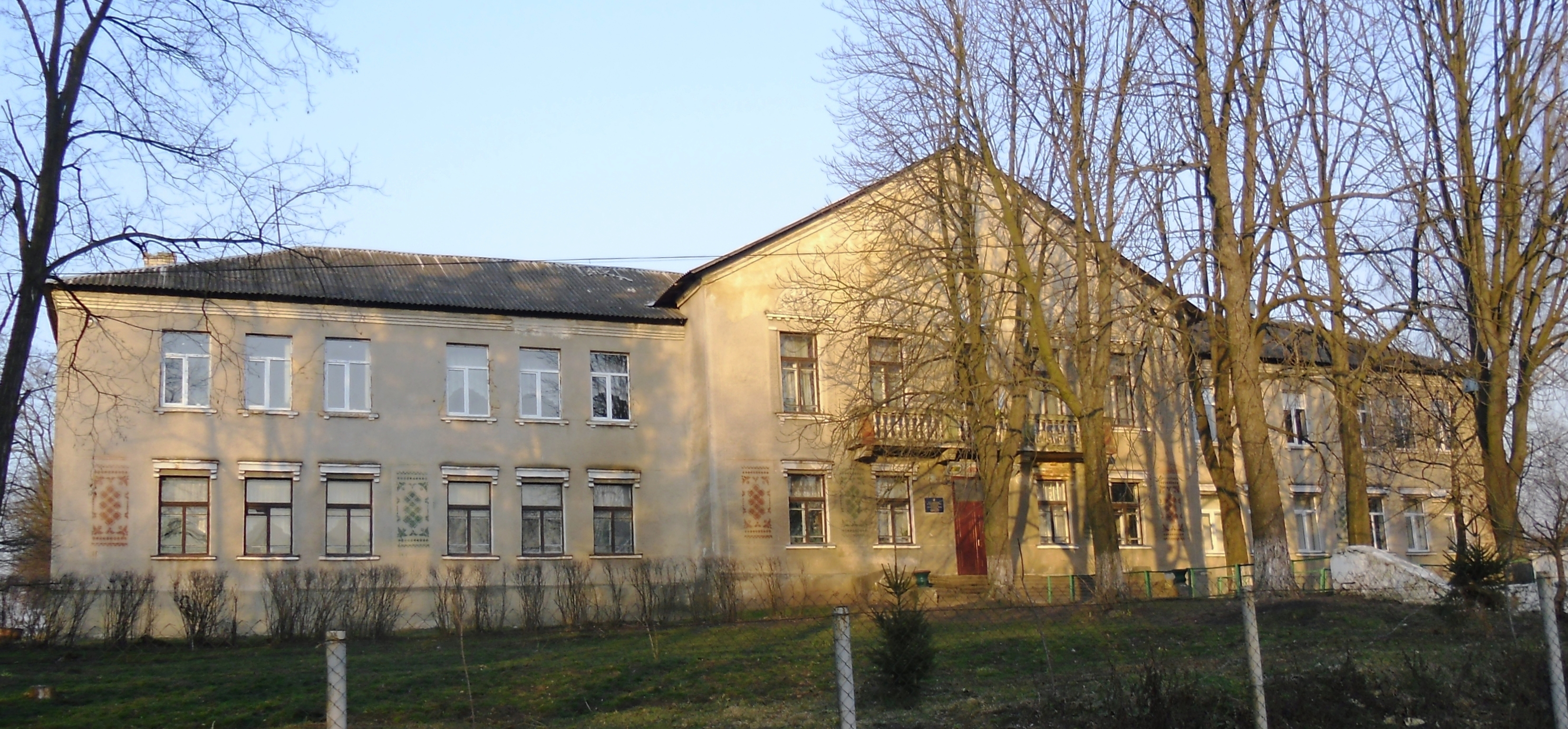

- Location within Lviv Oblast
- Coordinates: 49°52′29″N 23°20′23″E
- Country: Ukraine
- Oblast: Lviv Oblast
- Raion: Yavoriv Raion
- Area: 278 km^{2} (107 sq mi)
- Elevation: 241 m (791 ft)
- Population: 1,529
  - Density: 550/km^{2} (1,400/sq mi)
- Website: 1ua.com.ua/c146849 (in Ukrainian)

Rohizno (Ukrainian: Рогі́зно) is a village (selo) in Yavoriv Raion, Lviv Oblast, in southwest Ukraine. It belongs to Yavoriv urban hromada, one of the hromadas of Ukraine. The village is at a distance of 10 kilometers from the Yavoriv. Its population is 1,529. Local government — Rohiznenska Village Council.

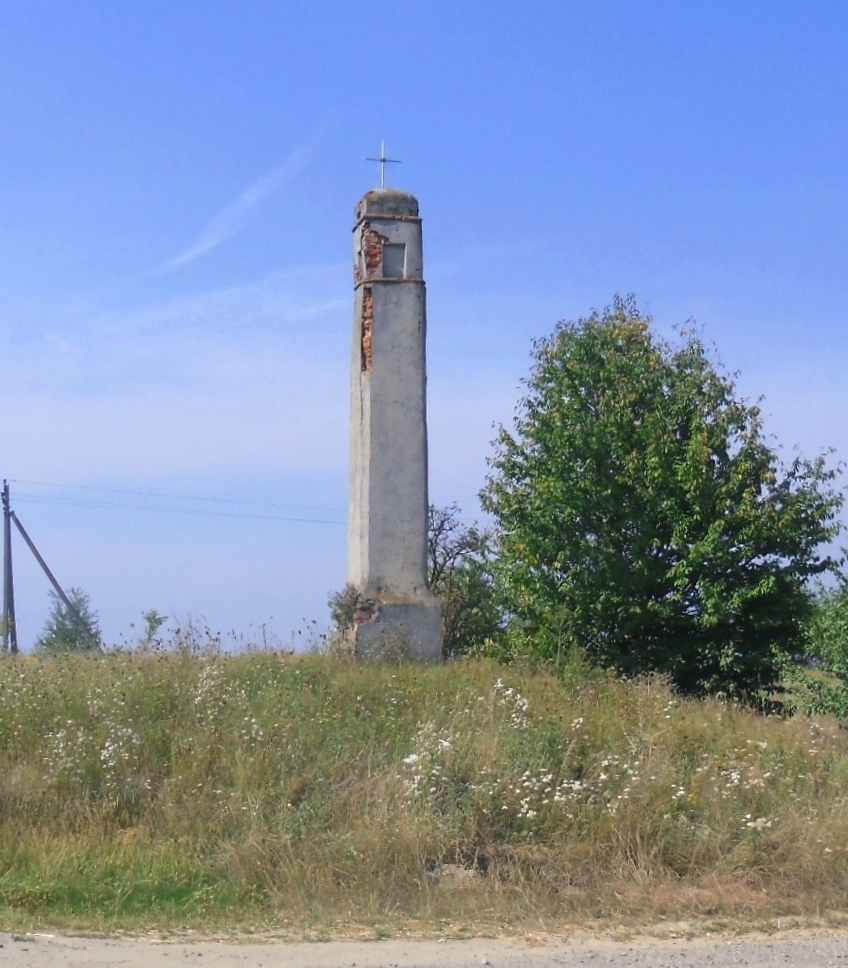
Monument of the victims of the Polish–Ottoman War (1672-76).

The first written mention of the settlement dates back to 1462. Been preserved archival records from the history of the village Rohizno of 1462, 1464, 1471, 1500, 1515 and 1589 years.
Monument of the victims of the Polish–Ottoman War (1672–76) is saved near the village Rohizno. From those times been saved Ukrainized Tatar names in the village.

== Literature ==
- Ukrainian: Історія міст і сіл УРСР : Львівська область. – К. : ГРУРЕ, 1968 р., p.929.
