= Chernyliava =

Rural locality in Lviv Oblast, Ukraine

Chernyliava Чернилява
- Village
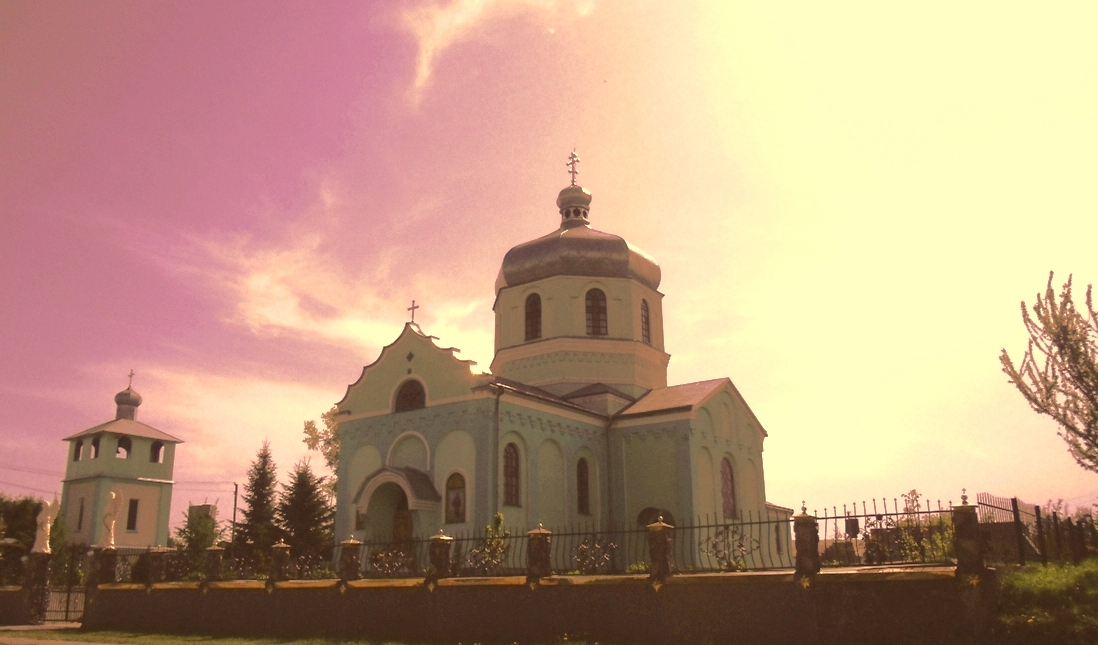
- Church of Sts. Peter and Paul, Chernyliava

- Location within Lviv Oblast
- Coordinates: 49°58′34″N 23°19′47″E
- Country: Ukraine
- Oblast: Lviv Oblast
- District: Yavoriv Raion
- Established: 1480

Area
  - Total: 2,516 km^{2} (971 sq mi)
- Elevation /(average value of): 243 m (797 ft)

Population
  - Total: 1,745
  - Density: 0.6936/km^{2} (1.796/sq mi)
- Time zone: UTC+2 (EET)
  - Summer (DST): UTC+3 (EEST)
- Postal code: 81030
- Area code: +380 3259
- Website: селище Чернилява, райцентр Яворів_{(Ukrainian)}

Chernyliava (Ukrainian: Черниля́ва) is a village (selo) in Yavoriv Raion, Lviv Oblast, in the West Ukraine. It belongs to Yavoriv urban hromada, one of the hromadas of Ukraine. The population of the village is 1745 people.

== Geography ==
The village is located in the western part of the Lviv region near on the border of the Republic of Poland. It is at a distance 61 kilometres (38 mi) from the regional center of Lviv, and 7 kilometres (4.3 mi) from the district center Yavoriv.

== History and religion ==
1480 is considered to be founding date of the village. The Men's Monastery in the 12th and 13th centuries has been in the village Chernyliava. And Chernyliava village name comes from the word "chernets" (Ukrainian: чернець).

Church of the Holy Apostles Peter and Paul of Parish of UAOC is acting today in the village.

== Literature ==
- Історія міст і сіл УРСР : Львівська область, Яворівський район, Чернилява. – К. : ГРУРЕ, 1968 р. Page 930 (in Ukrainian)
- Лаба В. Історія села Чернилява від найдавніших часів до 1939 р. – Льв.: 2000 р. – 36 с. (in Ukrainian)
