= Birky, Yavoriv Raion, Lviv Oblast =

Rural locality in Lviv Oblast, Ukraine

Birky Бірки
- Village
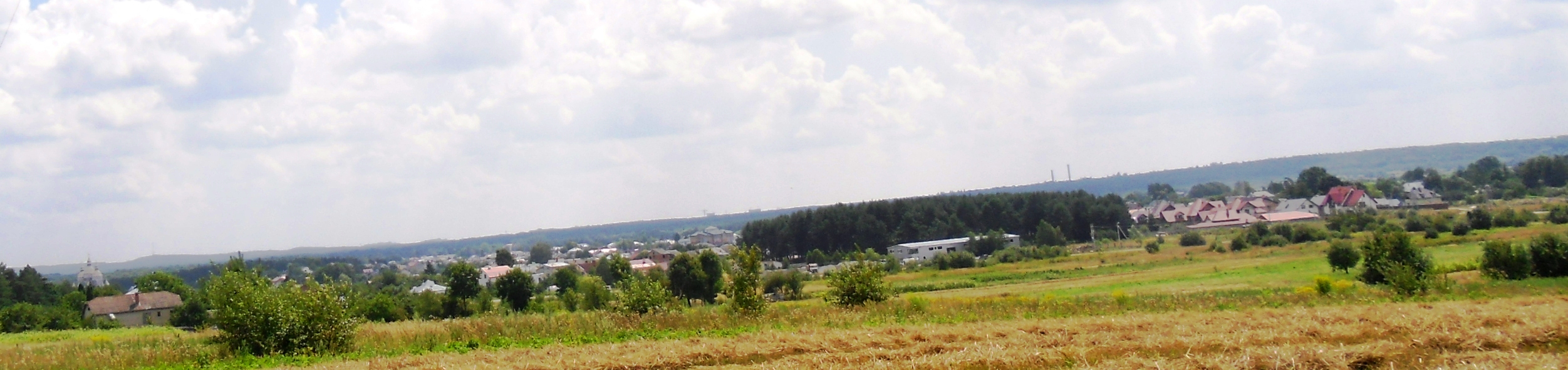
- View of the village Birky, Yavoriv Raion.

- Location within Lviv Oblast
- Coordinates: 49°54′48″N 23°55′04″E
- Country: Ukraine
- Oblast: Lviv Oblast
- District: Yavoriv Raion
- Established: 1785

Area
  - Total: 2,765 km^{2} (1,068 sq mi)
- Elevation /(average value of): 292 m (958 ft)

Population
  - Total: 2,203
  - Density: 0.7967/km^{2} (2.064/sq mi)
- Time zone: UTC+2 (EET)
  - Summer (DST): UTC+3 (EEST)
- Postal code: 81092
- Area code: +380 3259

Birky (Ukrainian: Бі́рки, formerly known as Birky Yanivski (Ukrainian: Бірки Янівські) and Birky Dominikanski (Ukrainian: Бірки Домініканські) is a village (selo) in Yavoriv Raion, Lviv Oblast (province) of Western Ukraine. It belongs to Ivano-Frankove settlement hromada, one of the hromadas of Ukraine. Population: 2203. Local government is administered by Birkivska Village Council.

== Geography ==
Birky village is located at the distance of 52 kilometres (32 mi) from the district center of Yavoriv, but is closer to the regional center of Lviv (14 kilometres (8.7 mi)). A railway Lviv - Rava-Ruska there passes through the village.

== History and religion ==
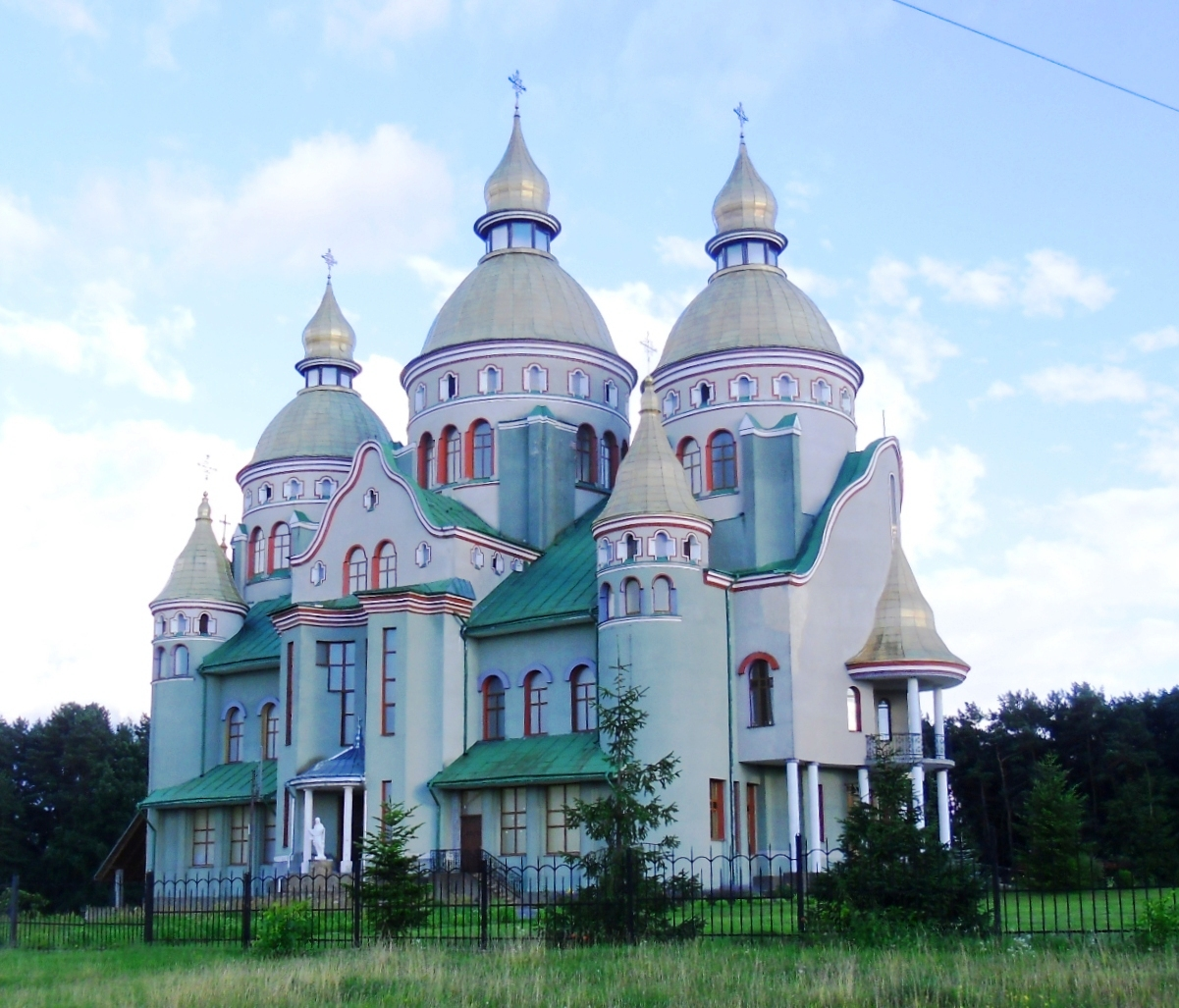
Ukrainian Greek-Catholic Church of Saints Volodymyr and Olha in the village Birky.

The settlements arose at the end of the 18th century in the area, which was surrounded by hills. Originally have settled monastics of the Dominican Order. From this came the name of the village – Birky Dominikanski, name of the village, which was until 1947.
The first written mention of the village dates back to 1785.
In the village operates the Sts. Volodymyr and Olha Ukrainian Catholic Church, built in 2010.

== Literature ==
- Історія міст і сіл УРСР : Львівська область, Яворівський район, Бірки. – К. : ГРУРЕ, 1968 р. Page 925 (in Ukrainian)
