= Balychi =

Rural locality in Lviv Oblast, Ukraine

Balychi Баличі
- Village
- Interactive map of Balychi
- Location in Lviv Oblast Location within Ukraine
- Coordinates: 49°45′59″N 23°01′43″E
- Country: Ukraine
- Oblast: Lviv Oblast
- Region: Yavoriv Raion
- Established: 12th Century

Population (2022)
  - Total: 834
- Time zone: UTC+2 (Eastern European Time)
  - Summer (DST): UTC+3 (Eastern European Summer Time)

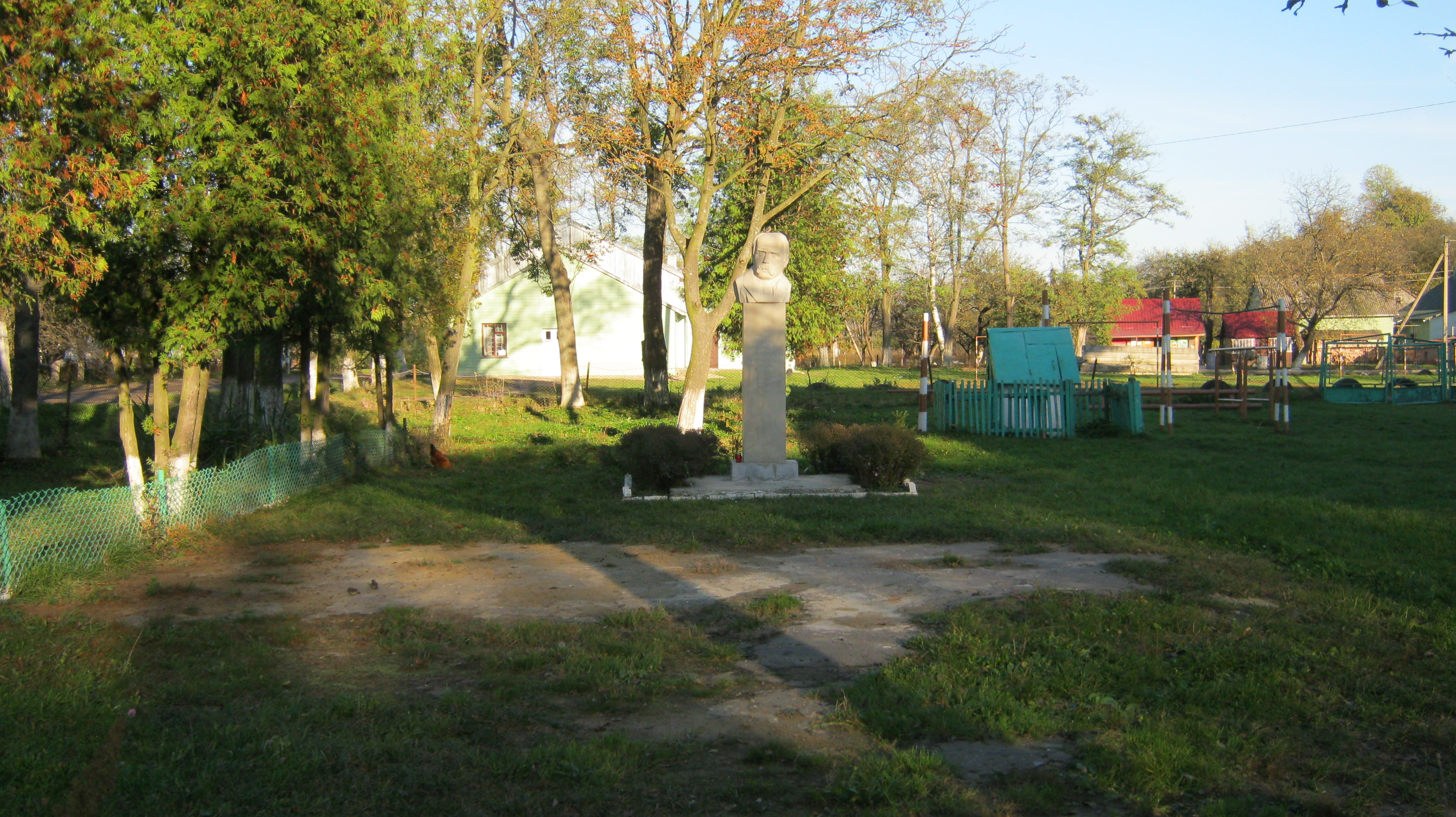

Balychi (Ukrainian: Баличі; Polish: Balice; Russian: Баличи) is a village in Yavoriv Raion, Lviv Oblast in western Ukraine. It belongs to Shehyni rural hromada, one of the hromadas of Ukraine. Balychi has 834 inhabitants. It is named after an aristocratic Balicki family who acquired the land from Jan Czech in 1400.

In the Second Polish Republic it was an independent unitary commune until 1934. Then it belonged to the collective rural Hussak commune in Mościce County in Lviv Voivodeship. In 1943–1945, Ukrainian nationalists from the OUN-UPA brutally murdered 5 Poles as a part of Volhynia genocide. After the war, the village was incorporated into the Ukrainian SSR. The parish church was closed and turned into a warehouse.

Until 18 July 2020, Balychi belonged to Mostyska Raion. The raion was abolished in July 2020 as part of the administrative reform of Ukraine, which reduced the number of raions of Lviv Oblast to seven. The area of Mostyska Raion was merged into Yavoriv Raion.
