= Staryi Yar =

Rural locality in Lviv Oblast, Ukraine

Staryi Yar Старий Яр
- Village
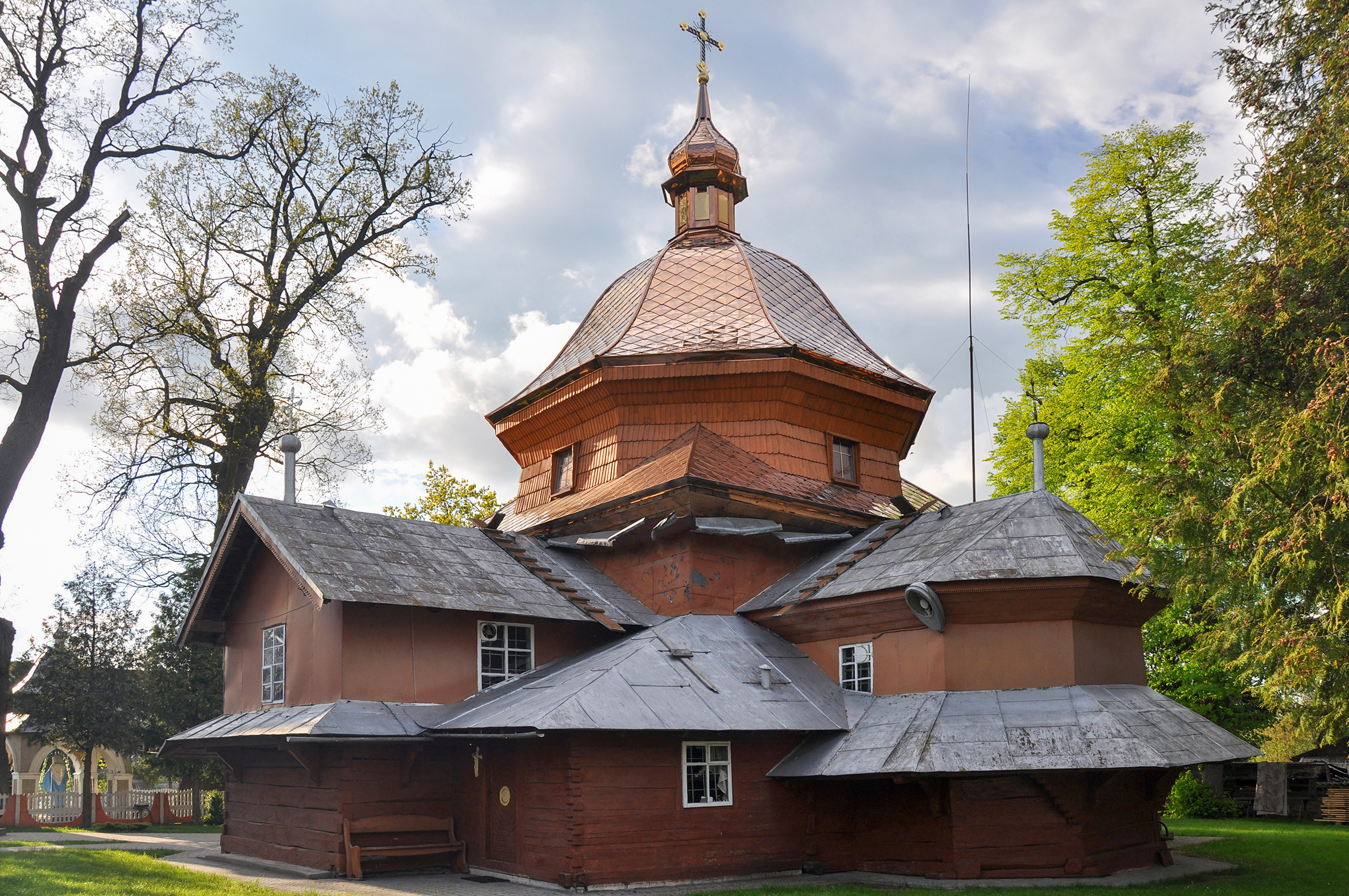
- Saint Paraskevi wooden church in Staryi Yar, founded in 1638 and rebuilt in the 19th century

- Location within Ukraine Location within Lviv Oblast
- Coordinates: 49°59′19″N 23°24′59″E
- Country: Ukraine
- Oblast: Lviv Oblast
- Raion: Yavoriv Raion
- Hromada: Yavoriv urban hromada
- Established: 1446
- Area: 1.38 km^{2} (0.53 sq mi)
- Elevation: 254 m (833 ft)
- Population (2001): 1,331
  - Density: 964/km^{2} (2,500/sq mi)
- Post code: 81025
- Area code: +380 3259

Staryi Yar (Ukrainian: Старий Яр, translated as "Old Gully") is a Ukrainian village in Yavoriv Raion (district) of Lviv Oblast (province). It belongs to Yavoriv urban hromada, one of the hromadas of Ukraine. It is located 5 km (3 mi) north of Yavoriv city. Staryi Yar was founded in 1446, has an area of 1.3 square kilometres (0.5 sq mi) and an elevation of 254 metres (833 ft). According to the 2001 census, it has a population of 1,331 inhabitants.
