= Nahachiv =

Rural locality in Lviv Oblast, Ukraine

- Village
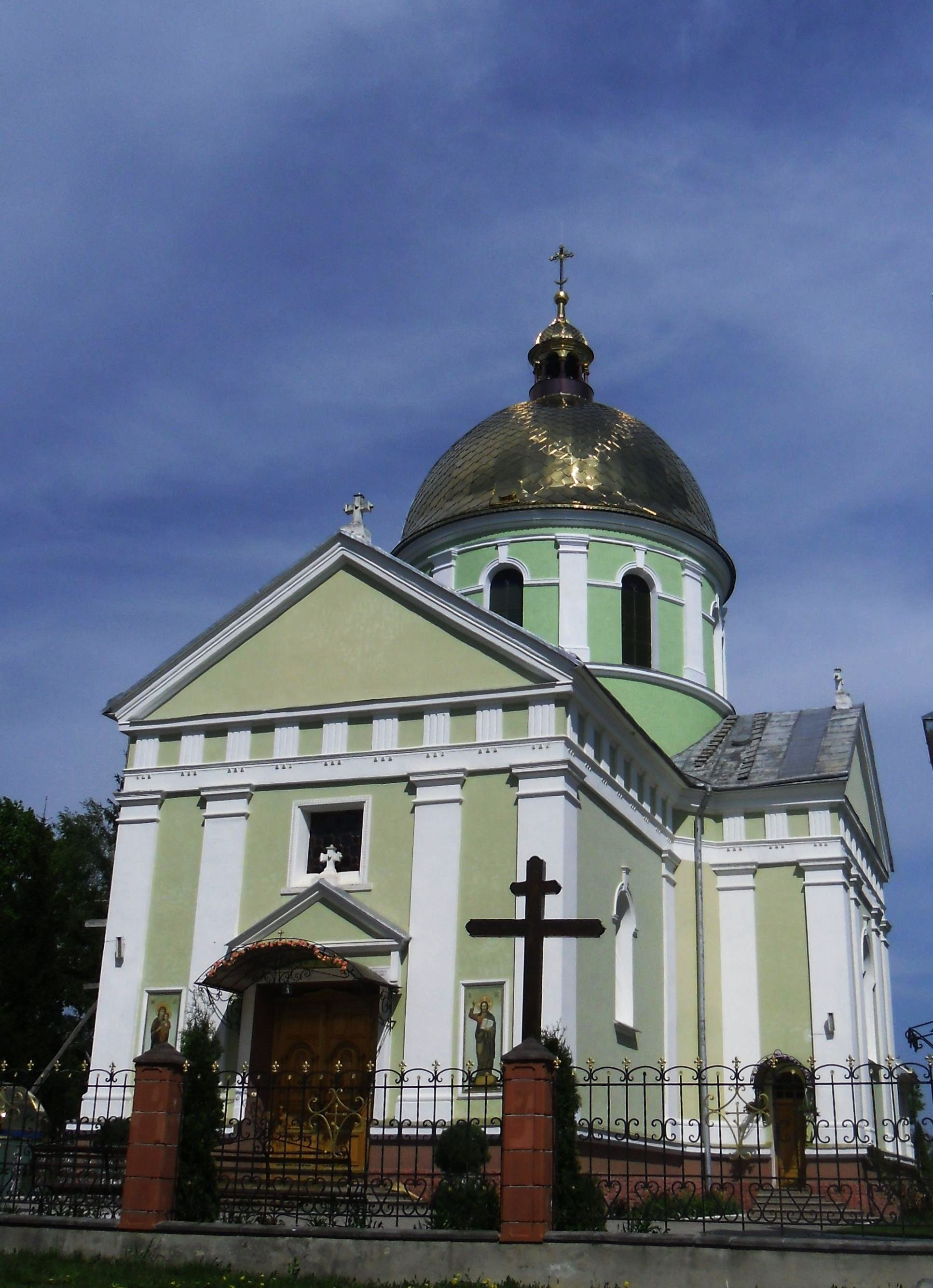
- Church of Saint Simeon Stylites in village Nahachiv Yavoriv Raion Lviv Oblast.

- Location within Lviv Oblast
- Coordinates: 50°00′25″N 23°16′50″E
- Country: Ukraine
- Oblast: Lviv Oblast
- Raion: Yavoriv Raion
- Area: 3,794 km^{2} (1,465 sq mi)
- Elevation: 219 m (719 ft)
- Population: 3,738
  - Density: 87,419/km^{2} (226,410/sq mi)
- Website: с Нагачів Львівська область, Яворівський район _{(Ukrainian)}

Nahachiv (Ukrainian: Нага́чів) is a village (selo) in Yavoriv Raion, Lviv Oblast, in southwest Ukraine. The village is at a distance of 70 kilometres (43 mi) from the city of Lviv and 12 kilometres (7.5 mi) from the city of Yavoriv. It belongs to Yavoriv urban hromada, one of the hromadas of Ukraine. Its population is 3,738. Local government – Nahachivska Village Council.

== History ==
The first historical mention of Nahachiv fixed in the 1456, but there were older - 12 - 13th century.

In territory of village are preserved the ancient fortress mounts 6 - 7th century. The oldest findings from the area are Palaeolithic (old Stone Age) is a stone ax.
