= Zavadiv, Yavoriv urban hromada, Yavoriv Raion, Lviv Oblast =

Rural locality in Lviv Oblast, Ukraine

Zavadiv Завадів
- Village
- Location within Lviv Oblast Location within Ukraine
- Coordinates: 50.0606°N 23.3925°E
- Country: Ukraine
- Oblast: Lviv Oblast
- Raion: Yavoriv Raion

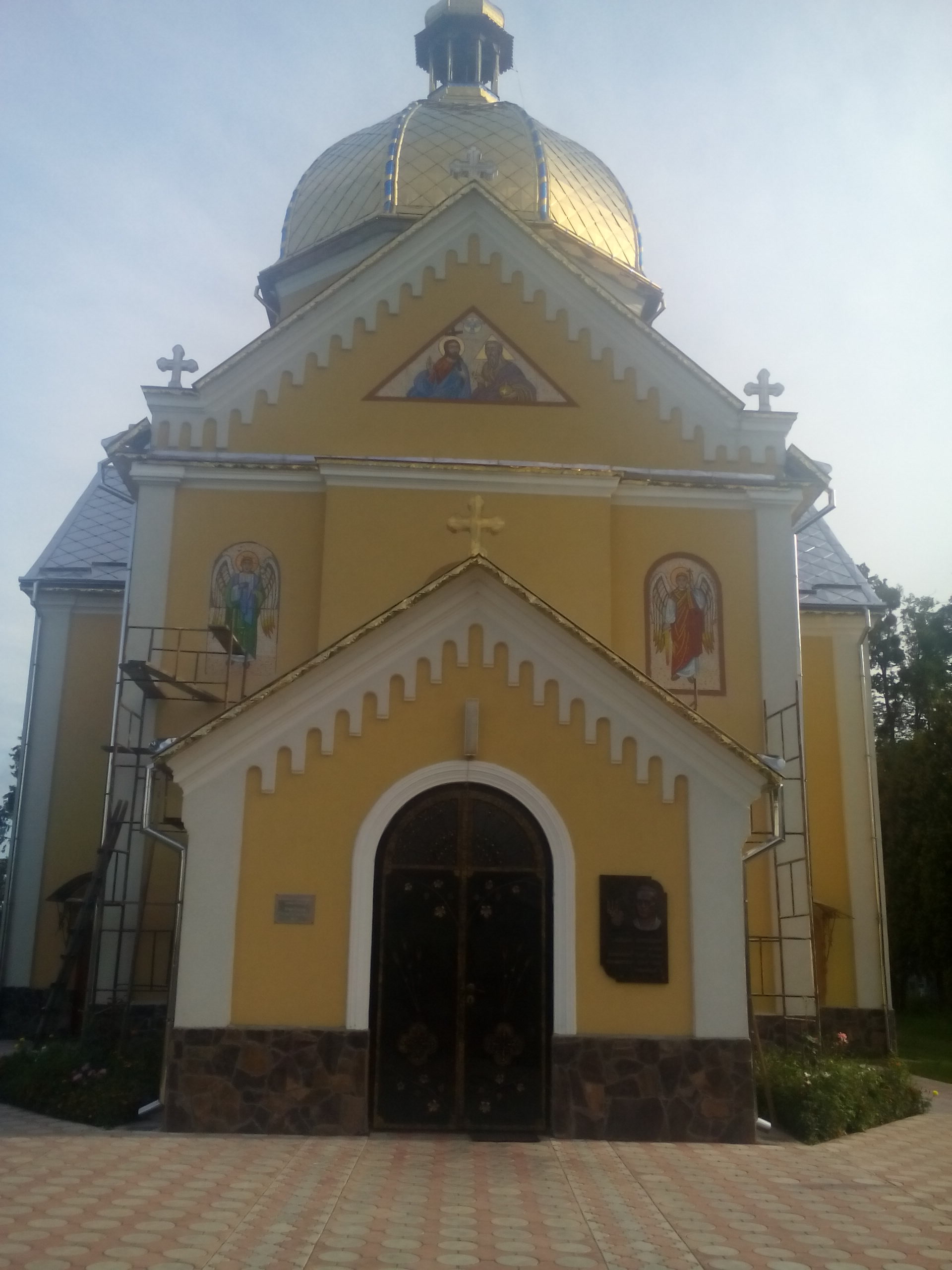

Zavadiv (Ukrainian: Зава́дів) is a village (selo) in Yavoriv Raion, Lviv Oblast (province) of Western Ukraine. It belongs to Yavoriv urban hromada, one of the hromadas of Ukraine.
