= Shehyni (border checkpoint) =

Border checkpoint between Ukraine and Poland

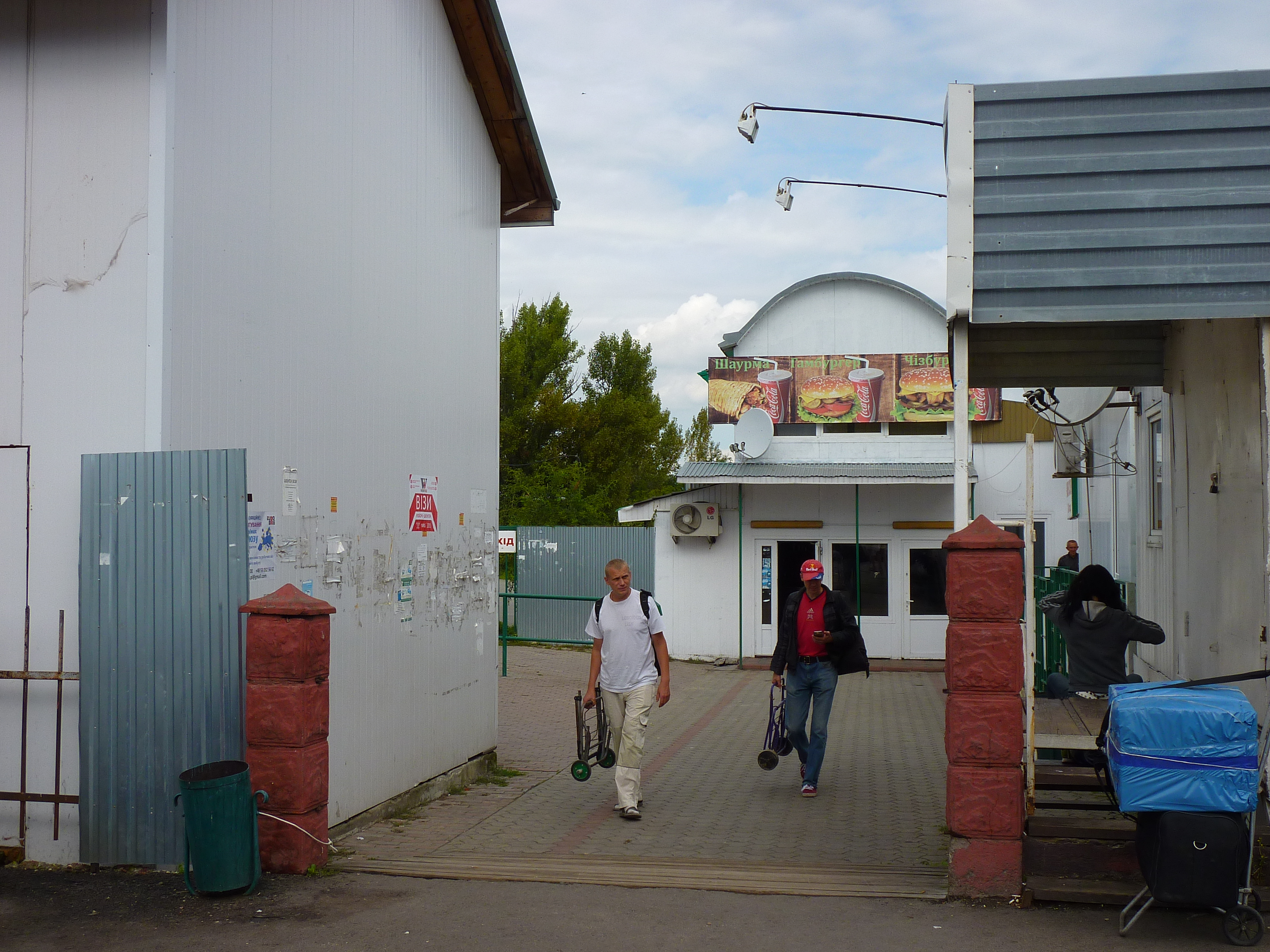

Location
- Country: Ukraine
- Location: Shehyni, Yavoriv Raion, Lviv Oblast
- Coordinates: 49°47′56″N 22°58′22″E

Map of the area

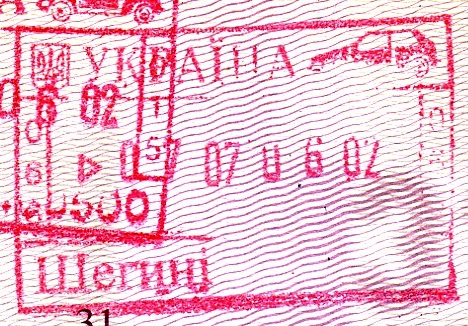
Visa stamp

Shehyni (Ukrainian: Шегині, Polish: Szeginie) is a land border crossing between Ukraine and Poland on the Ukrainian side, in the village of Shehyni, Yavoriv Raion, Lviv Oblast.

The crossing is situated on autoroute M 11. Across the border on the Polish side is the village of Medyka, Jaroslaw County, Podkarpackie Voivodeship.

The type of crossing is automobile, status - international. The types of transportation for automobile crossings are passenger and freight.

The port of entry is part of the Mostyska customs post of Lviv customs.

== See also ==
- Poland–Ukraine border
- State Border of Ukraine
- Highway M11 (Ukraine)
