= Velyki Makary =

Rural locality in Lviv Oblast, Ukraine

Coordinates: 50.151°N 23.397°E

Velyki Makary (Ukrainian: Великі Макари) is a village in Yavoriv Raion, Lviv Oblast, Ukraine. It belongs to Yavoriv urban hromada, one of the hromadas of Ukraine. Velyki Makary was founded in 1592, has an area of 0.56 square kilometres (0.22 sq mi) and an elevation of 268 metres (879 ft). As of the 2001 census, the population was 206.
