= Yavoriv toy =

Traditional wooden toy from Yavoriv, Ukraine

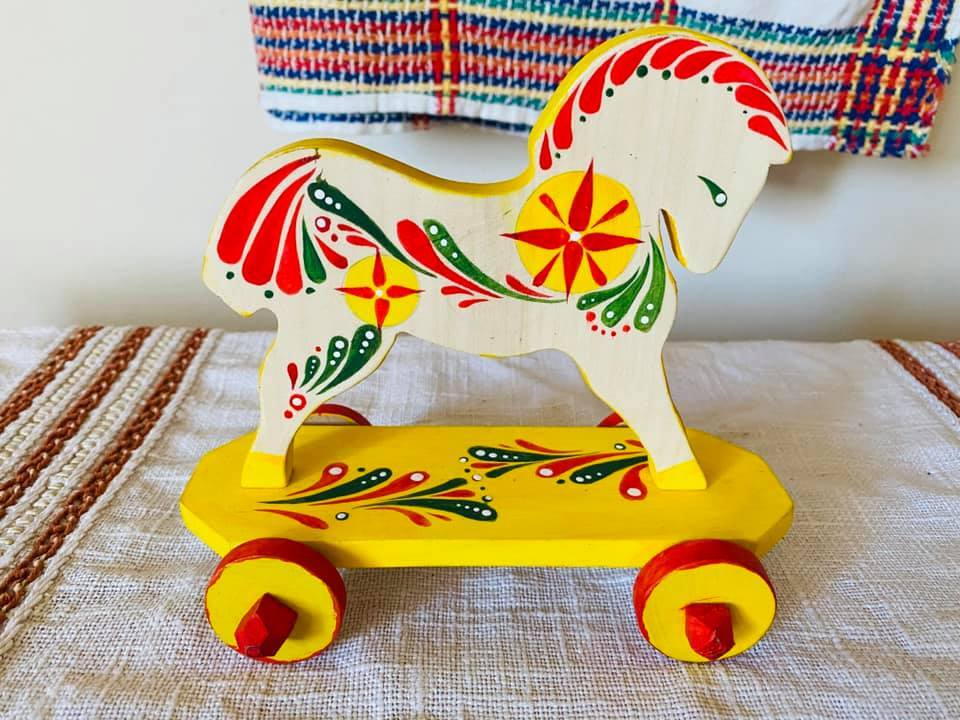
Horse toy

The Yavoriv toy (Ukrainian: Яворівська забавка, from забавляти, lit. 'to calm down') is a traditional toy from Yavoriv, Ukraine. It is traditionally made of aspen, which is believed to ward off evil spirits, and decorated with a local ornament called verbivka. The drawings of flowers and leaves are made in the form of willow branches. This tradition is inscribed on the National Register of the Intangible Cultural Heritage of Ukraine.

Originally, only three colors were used for the Yavoriv toy decoration: green, which symbolizes grass and leaves; red, which symbolizes fruits and berries; and blue, which symbolizes the sky and water. Since the 20th century, a fourth color—yellow—has become used, symbolizing the Sun. The paint was traditionally made of plants, but acrylic is used nowadays instead.

== History ==
The exact period when toys appeared in Yavoriv Raion is unknown. However, the uniqueness of the woodcarving and painting techniques confirm their local origin.

In Yavoriv, the artisanal production of wooden toys began in the 18th century and reached its peak in the mid-19th century. Yavoriv carpenters made various carts with ladders or with profiled and painted sides, with one or two silhouetted horses on the front of the base. Toy furniture (tables, chests, chairs, and bambetli, or bench beds) and toy musical instruments (violins, sopilkas, whistles, rattles) were popular. Yavoriv carvers made animalistic figurines for sale, mainly horse-drawn carts.

At the end of the 19th century, artisanal toy production could not withstand the competition with cheap factory products and gradually declined. In order to preserve the traditional toy industry, in 1886, the Galician Regional Department opened a toy school in Yavoriv. The teacher Pavlo Prydatkevych sought to modernize the old forms of toys and teach craftsmen more advanced technological processing of wood. However, they did not accept the newly introduced models, instead adhering to traditional flat forms and designs. The school existed for a little more than ten years. After its closure, Yavoriv craftsmen continued to make toys, although the demand for them continued to decline.

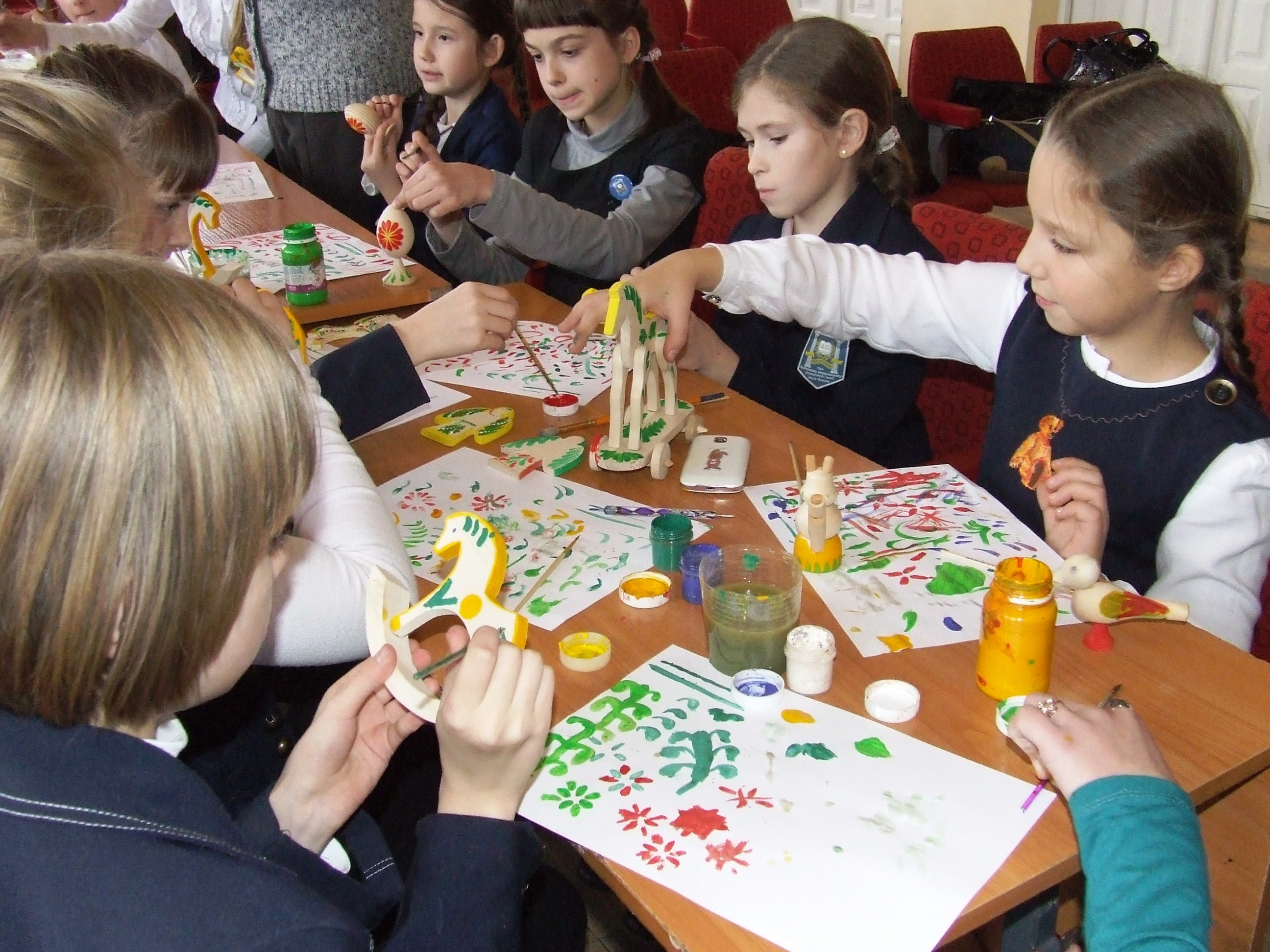
Master class on wooden toy decoration

=== 20th century onward ===
In the 1920s–1930s, cars and airplanes began to be produced in Yavoriv under the influence of factory-made toys in addition to traditional toys. In the painting, plant dyes were completely replaced by bright acrylic paints. The masters additionally introduced the color yellow—in the form of straight and wavy stripes, which enlivened the background and gave integrity to the ornamental composition.

In the first years after World War II, various children's toys were made by the T. H. Shevchenko Artel, including horses, carts, birds, butterflies, dolls, and whistles, all brightly painted with floral ornaments. Original carpentry toys of generalized silhouette form and dynamic design by masters Vasyl Pryima and Stepan Tyndyk were showcased at exhibitions, and later were purchased by museums.

Local woodworking developed even further when, in the 1930s, the carver Yosyp Stanko, experimenting with the ornamentation of Yavoriv painted chests and toys and studying the compositional and elementary foundations of Zakopane motifs, initiated "Yavoriv carving" on painted and polished surfaces of products extending beyond small cassettes and chests. In the 1950s, it was first used in decorating furniture. In 1946, on the basis of the Taras Shevchenko Children's Toy Production Artel, the Yavoriv Vocational School of Artistic Crafts was opened with a three-year training period, which in a short time had 105 students. Famous local masters worked at the school. At the same time, graduates of the Kyiv Art School were sent to the institution. In 1960, the art and craft school was renamed Vocational School No. 14.

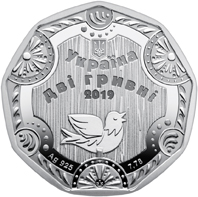
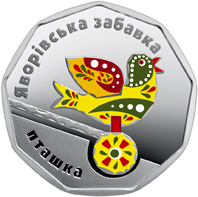
Commemorative coin dedicated to the Yavoriv toy

The Novoiavorivsk Museum of Local Lore founded on 14 September 2015 is a significant center for the preservation and popularization of the traditions of Yavoriv toys. It houses a collection of authentic wooden toys (horses, carts, whistles). The museum employees regularly hold master classes on painting Yavoriv toys. These lessons transfer craft skills to the next generations, reviving and popularizing the local craft.

== See also ==
- Wooden toys of Hrvatsko Zagorje

== Sources ==
- Chuhai R. Folk decorative art of Yavoriv Raion Народне декоративне мистецтво Яворівщини / R. V. Chuhai; National Academy of the Ukrainian SSR, Museum of Ethnography and Artistic Crafts of NA UkSSR. — Kyiv: Naukova dumka, 1979. — p. 102.
- Kosyk N., Bilska L. Yavoriv toy / N. M. Kosyk, L. B. Bilska. — Lviv: Ukrainian Institute "Eurosocium", 2014. — 56 pp. (Series "Eurosocium: traditions of Ukrainians). — ISBN 978-966-02-7078-7.
- Amulet —"Yavoriv toy"
