= Nemyriv, Lviv Oblast =

Rural locality in Lviv Oblast, Ukraine

Nemyriv Немирів Niemirów
- Rural settlement
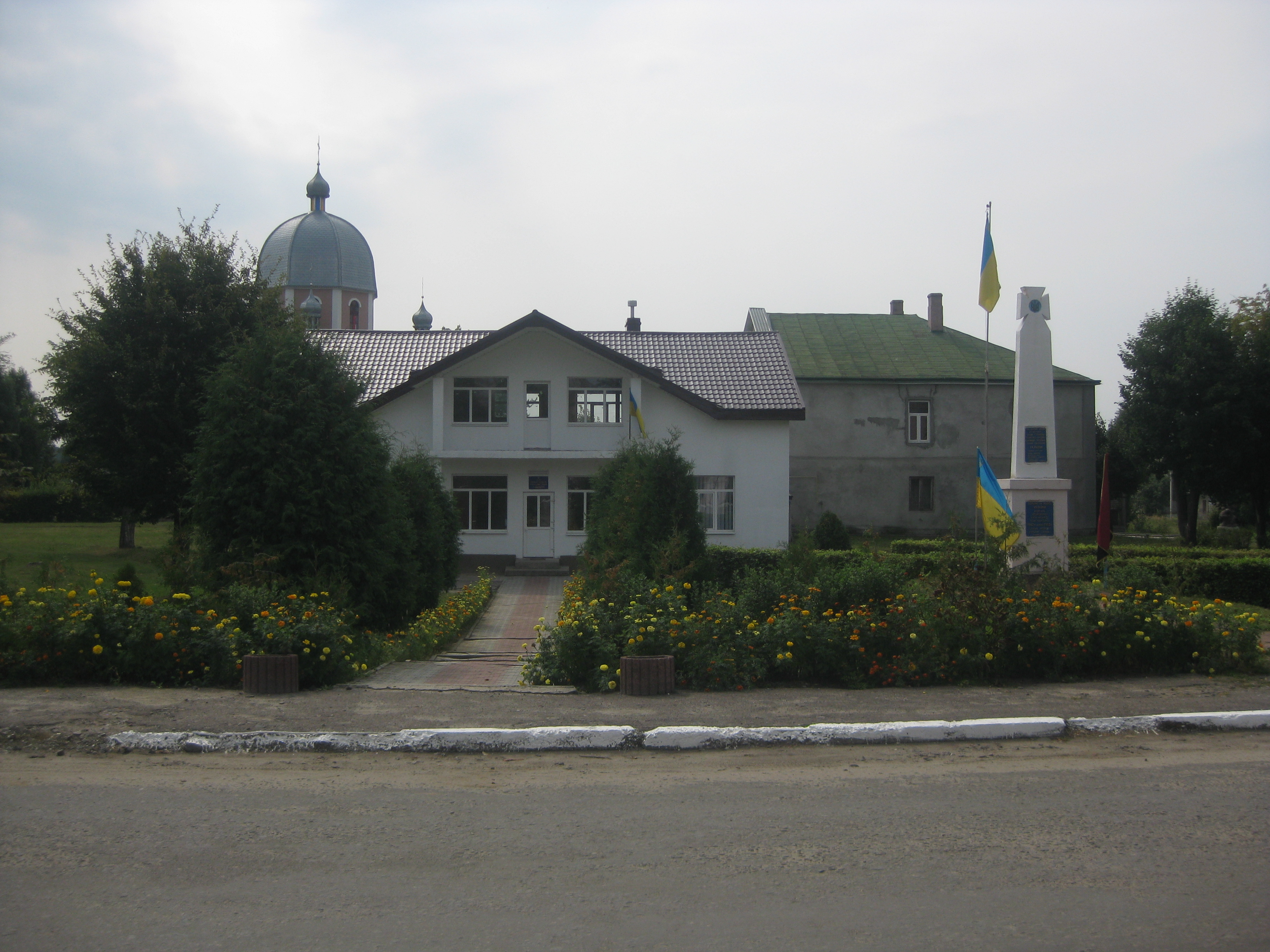
- The Settlement Council, an OUN-UPA memorial on the right.

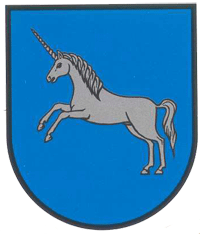
- Coat of arms

- Location in Lviv Oblast Location in Ukraine
- Coordinates: 50°6′11″N 23°26′24″E
- Country: Ukraine
- Oblast: Lviv Oblast
- Raion: Yavoriv Raion
- Hromada: Yavoriv urban hromada
- First mentioned: 441
- Magdeburg rights: 1581
- Urban-type settlement status: 1939

Government
  - Mayor: Mykola Ivanovych Besaha

Area
  - Total: 1.74 km^{2} (0.67 sq mi)
- Elevation: 268 m (879 ft)

Population (2022)
  - Total: 1,953
  - Density: 1,120/km^{2} (2,910/sq mi)
- Time zone: UTC+2 (EET)
  - Summer (DST): UTC+3 (EEST)
- Postal code: 81013, 81014
- Area code: +380 3259

Nemyriv (Ukrainian: Немирів; [neˈmɪr⁽ʲ⁾iu̯], once called in Polish: Niemirów) is a rural settlement and a health resort 21 kilometres from Rava-Ruska in Yavoriv Raion, Lviv Oblast (province) of Ukraine. Before the Polish September Campaign, until September 17, 1939, it was in Lwów Voivodeship (Poland). Nemyriv belongs to Yavoriv urban hromada, one of the hromadas of Ukraine. Population: 1,953 (2022 estimate). Local government is administered by Nemyriv Settlement Council.

== History ==
The history of Niemirów, as the town is called in Polish, dates back to the late 15th century, when its owner, a man named Niemierz, tried to turn the village into a town. He failed, and until 1580 Niemirów, part of Poland's Ruthenian Voivodeship, remained a village. In that year, local nobleman Andrzej Fredro founded a town along a merchant trail. It was officially confirmed by King Stefan Batory, and the Fredro family contributed much to the town's growth. Their coat of arms, the Bończa, is the current coat of arms of the village. In the early 17th century, Niemirow belonged to the Stadnicki family, while the neighboring Jaworów was property of the Sobieski family. Future Polish king Jan III Sobieski knew this area very well, as he used to be the starosta of Jaworów. In the mid-17th century, Niemirow was surrounded by a rampart with wooden gates, had two churches (Roman Catholic and Greek-Catholic), and a town hall. South of the town was a lake with a castle located by its shore.

In October 1672, during the Polish–Ottoman War, the Battle of Niemirów took place here, between forces of Hetman Sobieski, and Crimean Tatars, who plundered southeastern Poland.

Memory of Sobieski's victory remained vivid among local residents. In the late 18th century, a figure of Christ was placed on a hill where Polish soldiers were buried in 1672. In 1883, on the 200th anniversary of the Battle of Vienna, residents of Niemirów founded an obelisk, which was erected in the town square. The tablet attached to the obelisk read: "Jan III Sobieski, at that time Marshall and Crown Hetman, while chasing Tatars plundering Ruthenian lands, destroyed on October 7, 1672 a large Tatar camp, freeing 12,000 szlachta and peasants, women and children. In memory of the vanquisher of Islam, the town of Niemirów placed this tablet on September 12, 1883".

The oldest building of Nemyriv is church of the Holy Trinity, built in 1640 by Jan Stadnicki, the owner of the town. After World War II, when Polish population of the town was forced to move to the Recovered Territories, the church was turned into a warehouse. Returned to the Catholic community, it was re-opened in 1992 by Archbishop Marian Jaworski.

Nemyriv is famous for its sulphur waters, which were enjoyed by Jan III Sobieski. Officially, the sulphur water spa was opened in 1814, in the valley of the Smerdech river, by Count Ignacy Hilary Moszynski. The complex burned in 1834, but soon afterwards it was rebuilt and expanded. In the late 19th century, the spa belonged to Count Karol Krusenstern, who operated three sources, named Maryja, Anna and Bronislawa. There were ten luxurious villas, scattered in the local park, and in 1907, the spa was visited by 700 people. At that time, Niemirów was regarded as the best, and the cheapest spa of Austrian Galicia.

After World War I, Niemirów-Zdroj, as it was called, was operated by a specially created company, and was a very popular place in the Second Polish Republic. New villas were designed by Władysław Ruebenbauer, a talented architect from Lubaczów. In 1933, a monument of Jan III Sobieski was unveiled in the center of the spa, next to an oak tree from 1588.

Until 26 January 2024, Nemyriv was designated urban-type settlement. On this day, a new law entered into force which abolished this status, and Nemyriv became a rural settlement.

== See also ==
- Roztocze
- Roztocze National Park
