= Ivano-Frankove =

Rural locality in Lviv Oblast, Ukraine

Ivano-Frankove Івано-Франкове
- Rural settlement
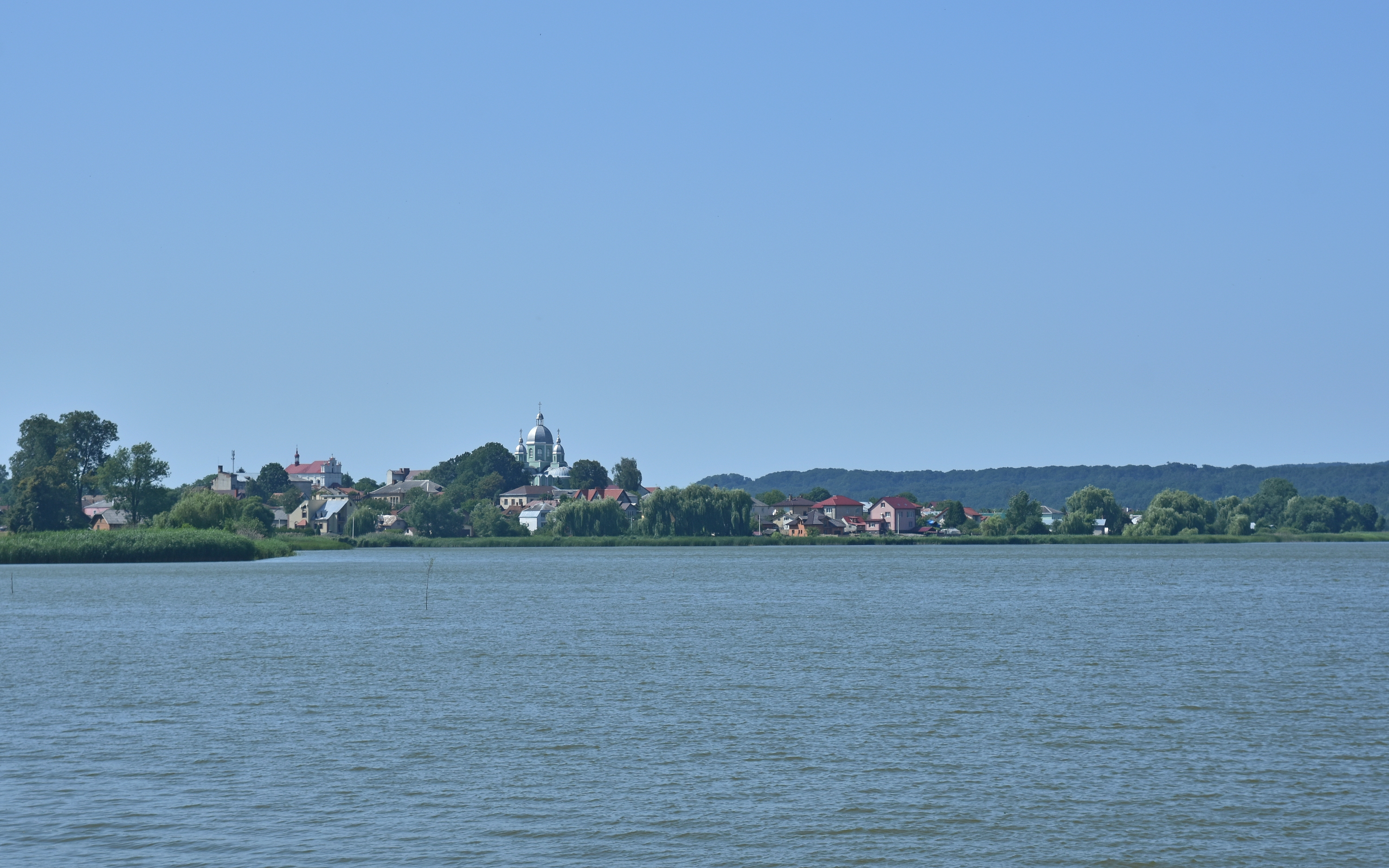
- Ivano-Frankove skyline

- Coat of arms

- Location in Lviv Oblast Location in Ukraine
- Coordinates: 49°55′11″N 23°43′37″E
- Country: Ukraine
- Oblast: Lviv Oblast
- Raion: Yavoriv Raion
- Hromada: Ivano-Frankove settlement hromada

Population (2022)
  - Total: 6,346
- Time zone: UTC+2 (EET)
  - Summer (DST): UTC+3 (EEST)

Ivano-Frankove (Ukrainian: Івано-Франкове, Polish: Janów), formerly Yaniv (Janów), is a rural settlement in Yavoriv Raion of Lviv Oblast in Ukraine. Ivano-Frankove hosts the administration of Ivano-Frankove settlement hromada, one of the hromadas of Ukraine. Population: 6,346 (2022 estimate).

== Geography ==
Ivano-Frankove is located on the right bank of the Vereshchytsia, a left tributary of the Dniester, in the highland area of Roztochchia. The Vereshchytsia is dammed in the settlement, forming Yaniv Reservoir.

== History ==
During the early 19th century a church in Classical style was built in the settlement.

During the Soviet period the settlement was renamed after the Ukrainian author Ivan Franko.

Until 26 January 2024, Ivano-Frankove was designated urban-type settlement. On this day, a new law entered into force which abolished this status, and Ivano-Frankove became a rural settlement.

Rose Girone, the oldest Holocaust survivor at the time of her death on February 25, 2025, was born in Janów.

== Economy ==
=== Industry ===
Ivano-Frankove is a centre of furniture production.

=== Transportation ===
The settlement is on Highway M10, which connects Lviv with the Polish border. Across the border, it continues as the A4 highway to Rzeszów and Kraków.

The closest railway stations are Zatoka and Mshana, both on the railway connecting Lviv with Mostyska and crossing to Poland.
