= Yavoriv urban hromada =

Urban hromada in Lviv Oblast, Ukraine

Yavoriv urban hromada Яворівська міська громада
- Hromada
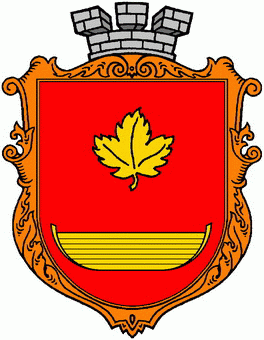
- Seal
- Interactive map of Yavoriv urban hromada
- Coordinates: 49°56′49″N 23°23′35″E
- Country: Ukraine
- Oblast: Lviv Oblast
- Raion: Yavoriv Raion

Area
  - Total: 834.7 km^{2} (322.3 sq mi)

Population (2022)
  - Total: 51,698
  - Density: 61.94/km^{2} (160.4/sq mi)
- CATOTTG code: UA46140110000063568
- Settlements: 82
- Cities: 1
- Rural settlements: 2
- Villages: 79

Yavoriv urban territorial hromada (Ukrainian: Яворівська міська територіальна громада, romanized: Yavorivska miska terytorialna hromada) is a hromada (municipality) in Ukraine, in Yavoriv Raion of Lviv Oblast. The administrative centre is the city of Yavoriv.

The area of the hromada is 834.7 square kilometres (322.3 mi^{2}), and the population is 51,698 (2022 estimate).

== Settlements ==
The hromada consists of one city (Yavoriv), two urban-type settlements (Krakovets and Nemyriv), and 79 villages:

- Bozha Volya
- Borysy
- Brozhky
- Buniv
- Vakhuly
- Velyki Makary
- Verbliany
- Vysich
- Vizhomlia
- Viytivshchyna
- Vovcha Hora
- Volia
- Volia Liubynska
- Borobliachyn
- Hlynets
- Hlynytsi
- Horayets
- Hrushiv
- Datsky
- Debri, Ukraine
- Dernaky
- Drohomyshl
- Zavadiv
- Zaluzhzhia
- Zarubany
- Ivanyky
- Kalynivka
- Kalytiaky
- Karpy
- Kovali
- Kolonytsi
- Koty
- Kokhanivka
- Lypyna
- Lypovets
- Lisok
- Luh
- Luzhky
- Liubyni
- Melnyky
- Moriantsi
- Nahachiv
- Nakonechne Druhe
- Nakonechne Pershe
- Novyi Yar
- Novyny
- Novosilky
- Oselia
- Pazyniaky
- Peredviria
- Pisotskyi
- Poruby
- Porudenko
- Prynada
- Rishyn
- Rohizno
- Rosnivka
- Ruda
- Ruda-Krakovetska
- Salashi
- Sarny
- Svydnytsia
- Semyrivka
- Seredyna
- Seredkevychi
- Slobodiaky
- Smolyn
- Sopit
- Staryi Yar
- Khliany
- Tsetulia
- Tsipivky
- Chernyliava
- Cherchyk
- Chornokuntsi
- Shavari
- Shutova, Ukraine
- Shcheploty
- Shchyhli
