= Treaty of Jaworów =

1675 secret treaty between Poland-Lithuania and France

- Type: Alliance
- Signed: 11 June 1675
- Location: Jaworów, Polish–Lithuanian Commonwealth (now Yavoriv, Ukraine)
- Parties: Kingdom of France Polish-Lithuanian Commonwealth

The Treaty of Jaworów was a secret treaty signed on 11 June 1675 between the Polish–Lithuanian Commonwealth and France in Jaworów, Polish–Lithuanian Commonwealth (today Yavoriv, Ukraine). In the treaty, the Polish–Lithuanian Commonwealth promised to aid France against Brandenburg-Prussia, in exchange for French monetary subsidies and support for Polish claims over Ducal Prussia.

The French promised to mediate between the Polish–Lithuanian Commonwealth and the Ottoman Empire so that Polish-Lithuanian forces could be diverted from the southern border.

The treaty, however, did not have much effect on European politics, as the French diplomacy failed to improve the relations between the Ottomans and the Commonwealth. The 1676 Truce of Żurawno was unfavorable to Poland. France eventually concluded the Treaty of Nijmegen (1679) with Brandenburg, which cooled its relations with the Polish–Lithuanian Commonwealth, as Sobieski abandoned his pro-French stance; the Polish-French alliance had fallen apart by 1683 when some of the pro-French faction members were accused of plotting to depose Sobieski, and French ambassador Nicolas-Louis de l'Hospital, Bishop of Beauvais and Marquis of Vitry was forced to leave the country.

Mounting pressure from Ottoman Empire postponed plans for Sobieski's war with Brandenburg, and eventually lead to the creation of the Holy League in 1684, in which Poland and the Holy Roman Empire (which included Brandenburg-Prussia) had to ally against the Ottomans (as part of the Great Turkish War, a conflict whose Polish front was known as the Polish–Ottoman War (1683–99)).
