= Rose Girone =

Polish-born American supercentenarian and Holocaust survivor (1912–2025)

- Born: Rose Raubvogel; 13 January 1912; Janów, Austrian Poland
- Died: 24 February 2025 (aged 113 years, 42 days)
- Known for: Oldest known Holocaust survivor
- Children: 1

Rose Girone (13 January 1912 – 24 February 2025) was an Austro-Hungarian-born American supercentenarian. She was believed to be the oldest living Holocaust survivor at the time of her death.

== Early life ==
Girone was born Rose Raubvogel on 13 January 1912, in Janów, Austrian Poland (now Ivano-Frankove, Ukraine after post-war border changes). The family moved to Hamburg where they operated a theatrical costume shop. While in Hamburg, she learned to knit from an aunt.

In 1938, she married Julius Mannheim before moving to Breslau. Her daughter Rena was born in December of that year. Shortly after relocation, the Nazis launched Kristallnacht, and Mannheim was sent to the Buchenwald concentration camp. In 1939, with the help of a cousin, Girone acquired a visa to flee to Shanghai, China, and Mannheim was released under the condition that they would leave the country. She sold knitted wear and Mannheim worked as a taxi driver.

== Life in the United States ==
In 1947, the family was granted a visa for the United States, travelling first to San Francisco before settling in Queens, New York. There, she reunited with her mother, brother, and grandmother. The family moved into a hotel as part of a refugee resettlement program. Girone began working as a knitting instructor.

Following her divorce from Mannheim, Rose married Jack Girone in 1968, and the two moved to Whitestone, Queens and opening a knitting shop in Rego Park, with a second following in Forest Hills. Girone sold her knitting business in 1980, at age 68, but continued to volunteer at a nonprofit knitting shop in Great Neck and later worked at a knitting shop in Port Washington. She retired in 2017, at age 105.

Girone died at a nursing home in Bellmore, New York, on 24 February 2025, at the age of 113 years and 42 days. She was survived by her daughter.
