= Shehyni =

Rural locality in Lviv Oblast, Ukraine

Shehyni Шегині
- Village
- Main road in Shehyni

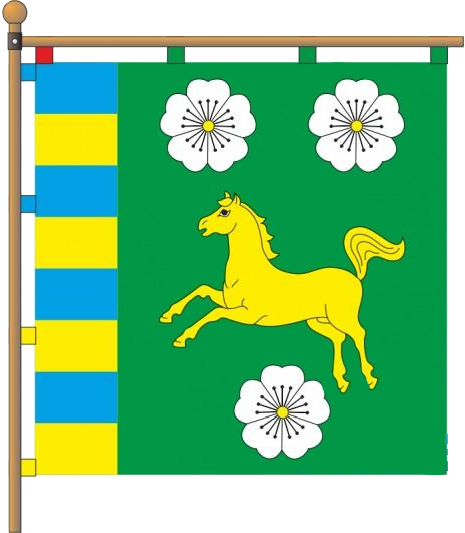
- Flag Coat of arms
- Interactive map of Shehyni
- Location within Lviv Oblast Location within Ukraine
- Coordinates: 49°48′03″N 22°58′29″E
- Country: Ukraine
- Oblast (province): Lviv
- Raion (district): Yavoriv

Shehyni (Ukrainian: Шегині, Polish: Szeginie) is a village of Yavoriv Raion in Lviv Oblast of western Ukraine. It hosts the administration of Shehyni rural hromada, one of the hromadas of Ukraine. Located at the border with Poland, it is best known as the site of the Medyka-Shehyni border checkpoint.

== History ==
The village, situated 14 km east of the city of Przemyśl was first mentioned in 1515 in a royal charter under the name of Szechinie. For most of its existence the village belonged to the Land of Przemyśl, itself part of the Ruthenian Voivodeship, Lesser Poland Province of the Kingdom of Poland and then (since 1772) Austrian Galicia.

From the very beginning, the village belonged to the so-called key of estates including Medyka, Pozdziacz, Torki and Buców, centred on the manor in Medyka, all based on a local variant of Magdeburg law, dubbed Ruthenian law. Initially the peasants settled there were tasked with taking care of the royal stables in Medyka; with time their duty towards the owner of Medyka manor was modified to simple serfdom, with yearly rent paid in grain. The village had a wójt (a certain Konarski) as late as 1565, and was populated by no more than 7 families of peasants. By 1589 the village had 48 male inhabitants (eligible for levy) and two inns paying a yearly rent of 78 zlotys. Some time before that date a mill and a fish pond were constructed in the village.

As part of the Kingdom of Galicia and Lodomeria in 1880 there were only a handful of houses along the road linking Przemyśl with Mościska (today Mostyska), (Note: Both names existed and continue exist today in each language.) with time the village grew to 1036 inhabitants (including 825 Ruthenians, (Note: Before the 1930s, the Ukrainian nationality was not officially recognized in Polish society.) 237 Poles and 63 Jews).

Until 18 July 2020, Shehyni belonged to Mostyska Raion. The raion was abolished in July 2020 as part of the administrative reform of Ukraine, which reduced the number of raions of Lviv Oblast to seven. The area of Mostyska Raion was merged into Yavoriv Raion.

== Infrastructure ==
In addition the border checkpoint, the village has the Mostyska-Derzhkordon train station; "Derzhkordon" translates to "state border". The M 11 road also passes through Shehyni.
