= Battle of Niemirów =

1672 battle

- Part of Polish-Ottoman War (1672–1676)
Date	7–8 October 1672
Location	Nemyriv, Lviv Oblast, Ukraine
Result	Polish-Lithuanian victory

Belligerents
Polish-Lithuanian Commonwealth	Crimean Khanate; Ottoman Empire

Commanders and leaders
John III Sobieski	Jambet Giray

Casualties and losses
100 killed	234 killed 6,000 captured

The Battle of Niemyrow or battle of Nemirów took place on 7–8 October 1672, during the Polish-Ottoman War (1672-1676). It was part of Jan III Sobieski’s autumn expedition, aimed at destruction of mounted Tatar units, which plundered southeastern provinces of the Polish–Lithuanian Commonwealth.

After the Battle of Narol, Polish units rested for some time, and on 7 October set off towards Cieszanow and Lubaczow. The area was raided by strong Crimean Tatar units, which burned villages, and captured thousands of civilians. After destroying a smaller Tatar unit, the Poles found out that a large force under Azamet Gerej, the son of the Crimean khan, concentrated near the town of Niemirow. Sobieski decided to carry out a surprise attack.

The battle itself was short. Tatar camp was attacked from both front and rear, and the battle soon turned into a rout, in which the invaders were massacred. Thousands of captured civilians were released, and Poles took rich booty. Among Polish officers who distinguished themselves in the battle were Andrzej Modrzejewski, the owner of Wielkie Oczy, and Mikolaj Hieronim Sieniawski, the owner of Oleszyce.

In 1872, on the 200th anniversary of the battle, the population of the town founded a commemorative monument of Jesus Christ. Furthermore, in 1883, an obelisk was placed in Niemyrow’s market square, with the inscription that read: “Jan III Sobieski, at that time Marshall and Crown Hetman, while chasing Tatars plundering Ruthenian lands, destroyed on 7 October 1672 a large Tatar camp, freeing 12,000 szlachta and peasants, women and children. In memory of the vanquisher of islam, the town of Niemyrow placed this tablet on 12 September 1883”.

== Sources ==
- Mala Encyklopedia Wojskowa, Wydawnictwo Ministerstwa Obrony Narodowej, Warszawa 1967, Wydanie I, Tom 2
