= Shehyni rural hromada =

Hromada in Lviv Oblast, Ukraine

Shehyni rural hromada Шегинівська сільська громада
- Hromada
- Seal
- Interactive map of Shehyni rural hromada
- Country: Ukraine
- Oblast: Lviv Oblast
- Raion: Yavoriv Raion
- Admin. center: Shehyni

Area
  - Total: 14,725 km^{2} (5,685 sq mi)

Population (2021)
  - Total: 5,170
  - Density: 0.351/km^{2} (0.909/sq mi)
- CATOTTG code: UA46140090000079730
- Settlements: 30
- Villages: 30
- Website: shegynivska-gromada.gov.ua

Shehyni rural hromada (Ukrainian: Шегинівська сільська громада) is a hromada in Ukraine, in Yavoriv Raion of Lviv Oblast. The administrative center is the village of Shehyni.

== Settlements ==
The hromada consists of 30 villages:

- Balychi
- Bykiv
- Boievychi
- Bolianovychi
- Boratychi
- Butsiv
- Velyki Novosilky
- Volytsia
- Hankovychi
- Horyslavychi
- Husakiv
- Zolotkovychi
- Iordanivka
- Koniushky
- Lypky
- Mali Novosilky
- Myshliatychi
- Mostyska Druhi
- Mocherady
- Pleshevychi
- Popovychi
- Radokhyntsi
- Tamanovychi
- Tyshkovychi
- Tolukovychi
- Tshchenets
- Khatky
- Khidnovychi
- Tsykiv
- Shehyni
