= Ivano-Frankove settlement hromada =

Hromada in Lviv Oblast, Ukraine

Ivano-Frankove settlement hromada Івано-Франківська селищна громада
- Hromada
- Seal
- Interactive map of Ivano-Frankove settlement hromada
- Country: Ukraine
- Oblast: Lviv Oblast
- Raion: Yavoriv Raion
- Admin. center: Ivano-Frankove

Area
  - Total: 4,206 km^{2} (1,624 sq mi)

Population (2021)
  - Total: 19,814
  - Density: 4.711/km^{2} (12.20/sq mi)
- CATOTTG code: UA46140010000081849
- Settlements: 32
- Rural settlements: 1
- Villages: 31
- Website: if-gromada.gov.ua

Ivano-Frankove settlement hromada (Ukrainian: Івано-Франківська селищна громада) is a hromada in Ukraine, in Yavoriv Raion of Lviv Oblast. The administrative center is the rural settlement of Ivano-Frankove.

== Settlements ==
The hromada consists of 1 rural settlement (Ivano-Frankove) and 31 villages:

- Birky
- Buda
- Velyki Hory
- Velykopole
- Vereshchytsia
- Verkhutka
- Vorotsiv
- Dibrova
- Domazhyr
- Dubrovytsia
- Zhornyska
- Zadebri
- Zatoka
- Zeliv
- Karachyniv
- Kozhychi
- Lelekhivka
- Lisopotik
- Lozyno
- Malchytsi
- Ozerske
- Palanky
- Porichchia
- Rokytne
- Serednii Horb
- Soluky
- Stavky
- Stradch
- Turycha
- Yamelnia
- Yasnyska
