= Balicki =

Balicki (feminine: Balicka; plural: Baliccy) is a Polish surname. Related surnames may be found in Belarus, Ukraine, and Russia.

== Other forms ==
Language	Masculine	Feminine
Polish	Balicki	Balicka
Belarusian (Romanization)	Баліцкі (Balitski, Balicki)	Баліцкая (Balitskaya, Balickaja)
Russian (Romanization)	Балицкий (Balitskiy, Balitsky)	Балицкая (Balitskaya, Balitskaia)
Ukrainian (Romanization)	Балицький (Balytskyi, Balytsky); Баліцький (Balitskyi, Balitsky)	Балицька (Balytska); Баліцька (Balitska)

== People ==
=== Balicki, Balicka ===
- Artur Balicki (born 1999), Polish footballer
- Cezary Balicki (born 1958), Polish bridge player
- Gabriela Balicka-Iwanowska (1871–1962), Polish botanist
- Jan Wojciech Balicki (1869–1948), Polish Roman Catholic priest
- Marek Balicki, Polish politician, Minister of Health under Leszek Miller
- Ron Balicki (born 1963), American actor
- Zygmunt Balicki (1858–1916), Polish sociologist

=== Balitsky ===
- Yevgeny Balitsky (born 1969), Russian and Ukrainian politician
- Vsevolod Balitsky (1892–1937), Soviet official
