= Yavoriv =

City in Lviv Oblast, Ukraine

Yavoriv Яворів Jaworów
- City
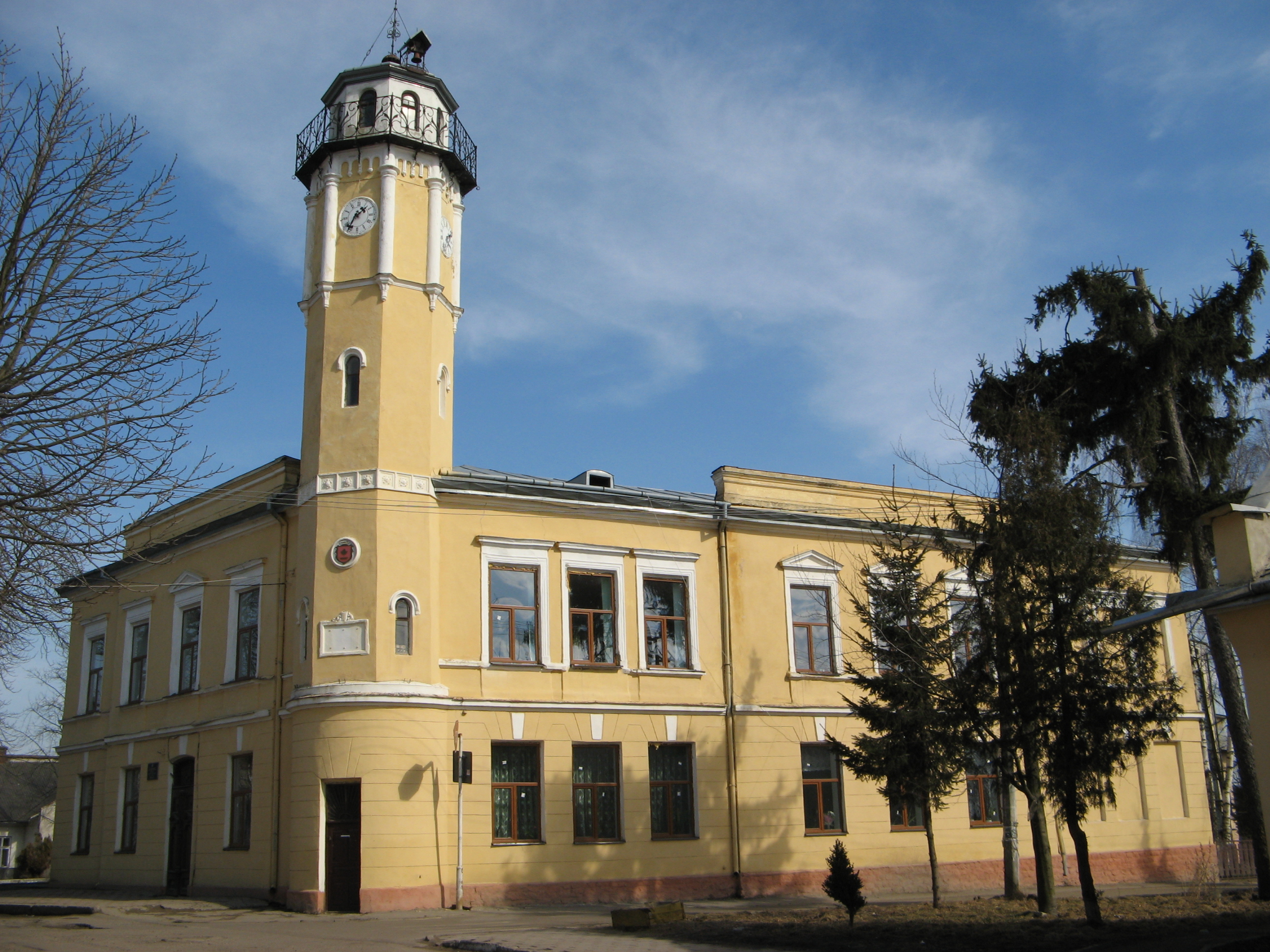
- Town hall

- Flag Coat of arms

- Location within Lviv Oblast Location within Ukraine
- Coordinates: 49°56′49″N 23°23′35″E
- Country: Ukraine
- Oblast: Lviv Oblast
- Raion: Yavoriv Raion
- Hromada: Yavoriv urban hromada
- First mentioned: 1436
- Magdeburg law: 1569

Area
  - Total: 23.35 km^{2} (9.02 sq mi)
- Elevation: 296 m (971 ft)

Population (2022)
  - Total: 12,785
  - Density: 547.5/km^{2} (1,418/sq mi)
- Time zone: UTC+2 (EET)
  - Summer (DST): UTC+3 (EEST)
- Postal code: 81000
- Area code: +380-3259

Yavoriv (Ukrainian: Яворів, IPA: [ˈjɑwor⁽ʲ⁾iu̯]; Polish: Jaworów; Yiddish: יאַוואָראָוו, romanized: Yavorov; Russian: Яворов, romanized: Yavorov; German: Jaworiw) is a city in Lviv Oblast, western Ukraine. It is situated about 15 kilometres (9.3 mi) from the Polish border. It serves as the administrative centre of Yavoriv Raion and is situated approximately 50 kilometres (31 miles) west of the oblast capital, Lviv. Yavoriv hosts the administration of Yavoriv urban hromada, one of the hromadas of Ukraine. Its population is approximately 12,785 (2022 estimate).

Not far from it is the watering-place of Shklo with sulphur springs.

== History ==
The town was first mentioned in written documents in 1436. It received Magdeburg rights in 1569, from Polish King Sigismund II Augustus. Jaworów was a royal town of Poland. It was a favorite residence of king John III Sobieski. In 1675 John III signed the Polish-French Treaty of Jaworów in the town, and there he received congratulations from the Pope on his success against the Turks at Vienna (1683), and ratified the formation of the Holy League alliance in 1684. In 1711, Francis II Rákóczi, Hungarian national hero who found refuge in Poland after the fall of the Rákóczi's War of Independence against Austria, visited the town.

Until the First Partition of Poland, Jaworów was an important center of commerce, located along main merchant route from Jarosław to Lwów. In 1772, it was annexed by the Habsburg Empire, and included within newly formed Austrian Galicia, where it remained until late 1918. In Galicia, it was the seat of a county, with a population of almost 11,000 (Poles, Jews, Ukrainians and Czechs).

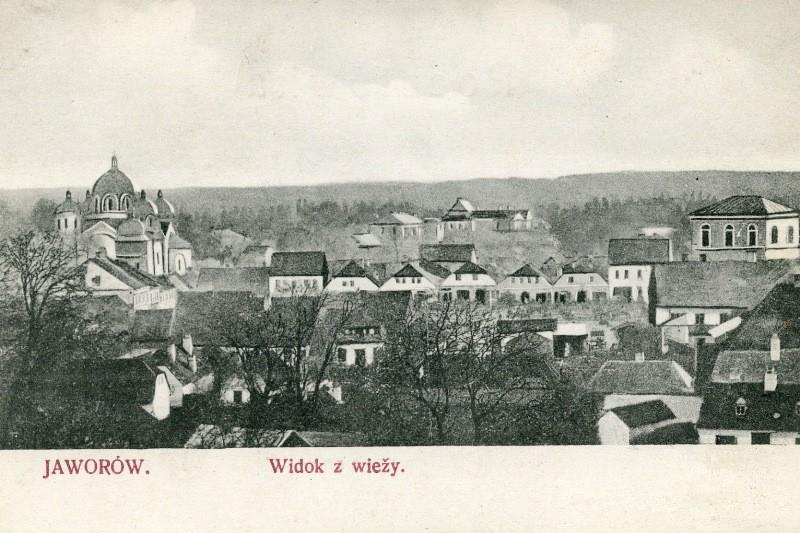
Early 20th-century view of the town

In the immediate post-World War I period, the area of Jaworów witnessed fights of the Polish-Ukrainian War. After the war, the town became part of the Second Polish Republic, where it remained until the joint German-Soviet invasion of Poland, which started World War II, in September 1939. The Jews of the village were merchants or artisans. There was a synagogue.

During the invasion of Poland, on 14–16 September 1939, Poles defeated invading Germans in the Battle of Jaworów. Despite the victory, the town soon fell to the Soviets, and was under Soviet occupation from 1939 to 1941, and then under German occupation until 1944. The Jewish population before the German occupation on 26 June 1941 was around 3000. Several hundred Jews were sent to local forced labor camps or to the Belzec extermination camp. A few were transferred to a labour camp in Lviv.

In 1944, the town was re-occupied by the Soviets, and in 1945 it was eventually annexed from Poland by the Soviet Union. After the war, the Soviet Extraordinary State Commission reported that more than 4900 people, most of them Jews, had been killed in Yavoriv, in addition to those sent to Bełżec. Only about 20 of the town's Jews were thought to have survived.

On 27 May 1947, the UPA blew up the statue of Lenin.

In the decades between the 1960s and 1990s the town was a sulphur mining centre; excavation pits and degenerated lands remain between Yavoriv and Novoiavorivsk.

On 10 December 1991, after the dissolution of the Soviet Union, it became part of Ukraine.

On 13 March 2022, during the Russian invasion of Ukraine, the Russians bombed the military base in Yavoriv. A Russian defence military spokesperson, Maj. Gen. Igor Konashenkov, claimed the attack killed up to 180 foreign mercenaries. The Ukrainian side claimed there were at least 35 dead and 134 injured. The attack was heard in neighbouring Poland.

== Population ==
Historical population
Year	Pop.	±%
1921	8,910	—
1931	10,690	+20.0%
2022	12,785	+19.6%

=== Ethnic groups ===
Distribution of the population by ethnicity according to the 2001 census:

Ethnic composition of Yavoriv
	percent
Ukrainians	96.54%
Russians	2.66%
Poles	0.24%
Belarusians	0.23%
Armenians	0.08%

=== Language ===
Distribution of the population by native language according to the 2001 census:

Language	Number	Percentage
Ukrainian	12 880	96.95%
Russian	358	2.69%
Other or undecided	47	0.36%
Total	13 285	100.00%

== Notable people ==
Among notable people born here are the Russian Orthodox Stefan Yavorsky (1658–1722), an archbishop and the first president of the Most Holy Synod; the poet Osyp Makovei (1867–1925), the Polish literary historian, editor and bibliographer Ludwik Bernacki (1882–1939), Ukrainian Greek Catholic Church bishop Vasyl Tuchapets, Władysław Langner (General of the Polish Army), Stanisław Nowakowski (president of the Polish Scouting and Guiding Association), and mathematician Wawrzyniec Żmurko. Noted Jewish commentator Rabbi David Altschuler was born in Yavoriv and served as rabbi at the local synagogue.

== Gallery ==
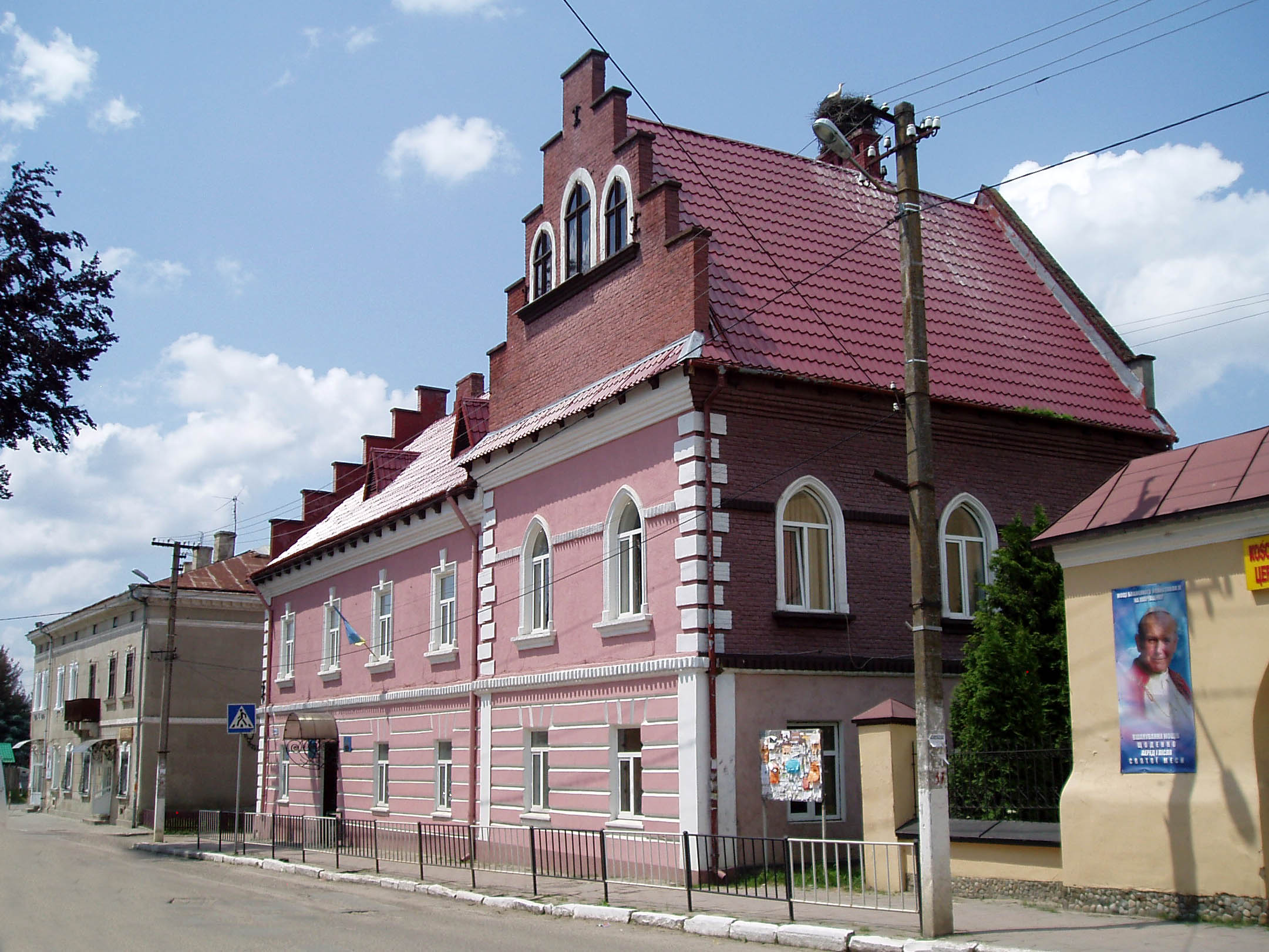
Lvivska Street

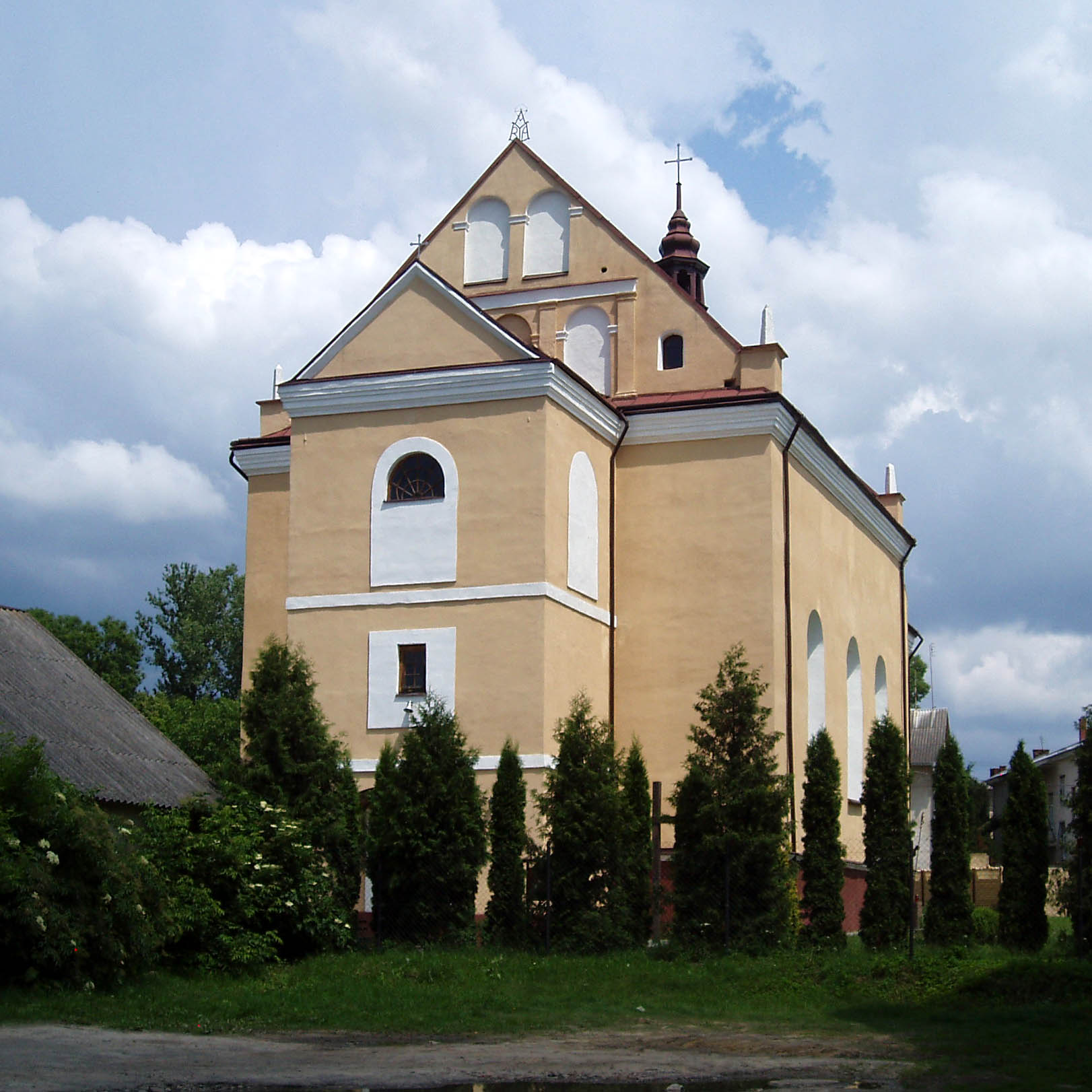
Saints Peter and Paul Church

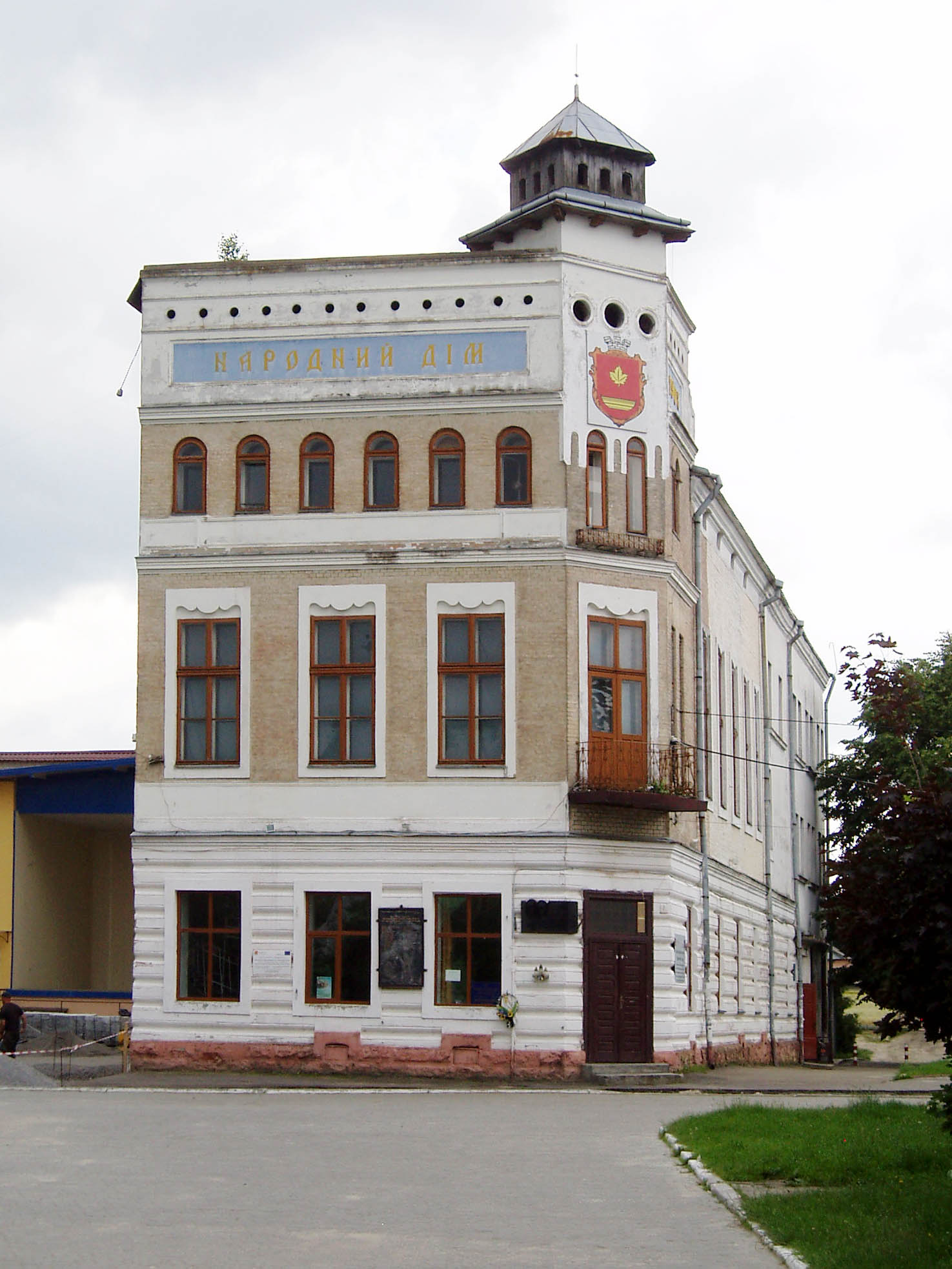
People's House

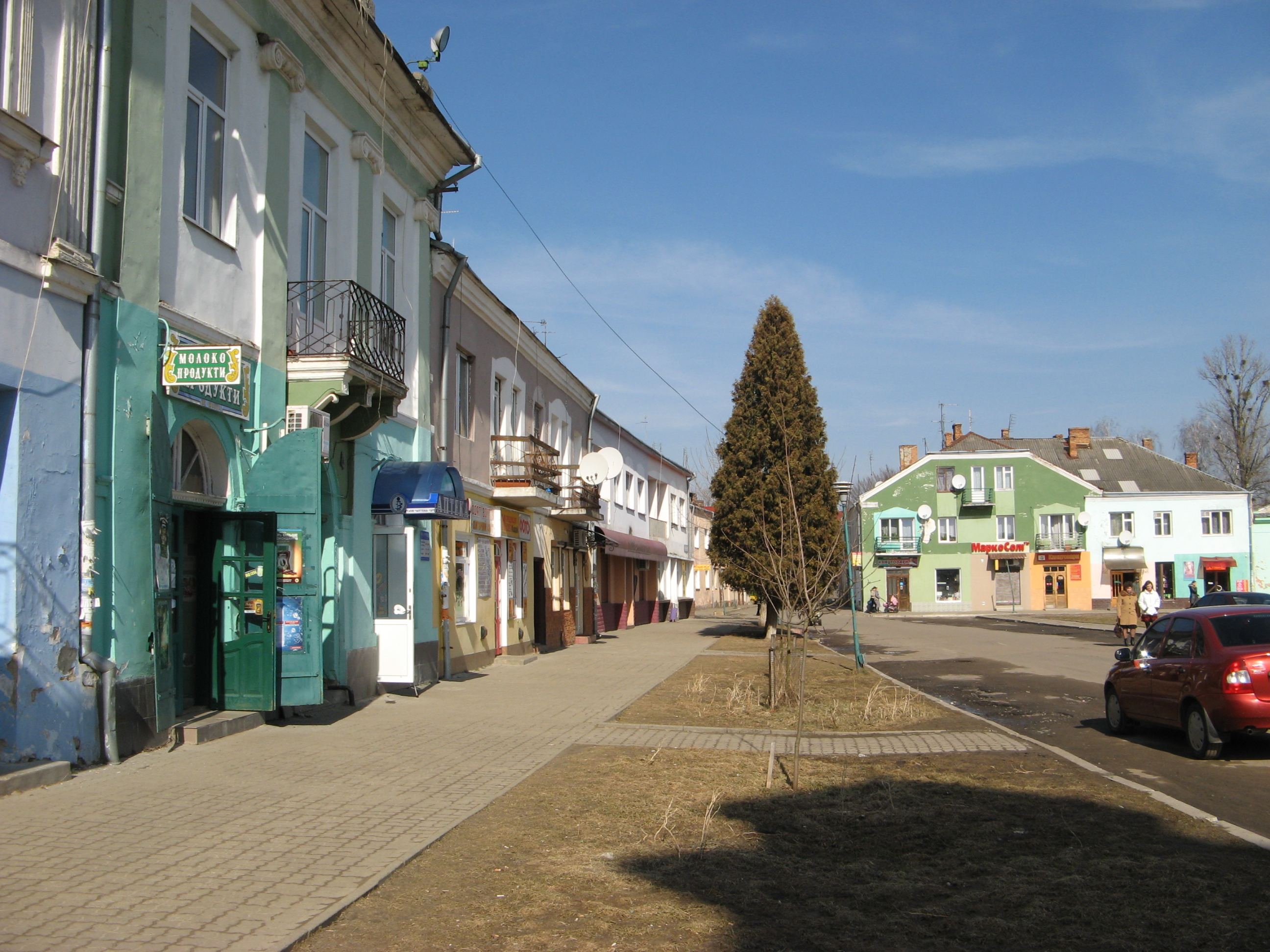
Town center

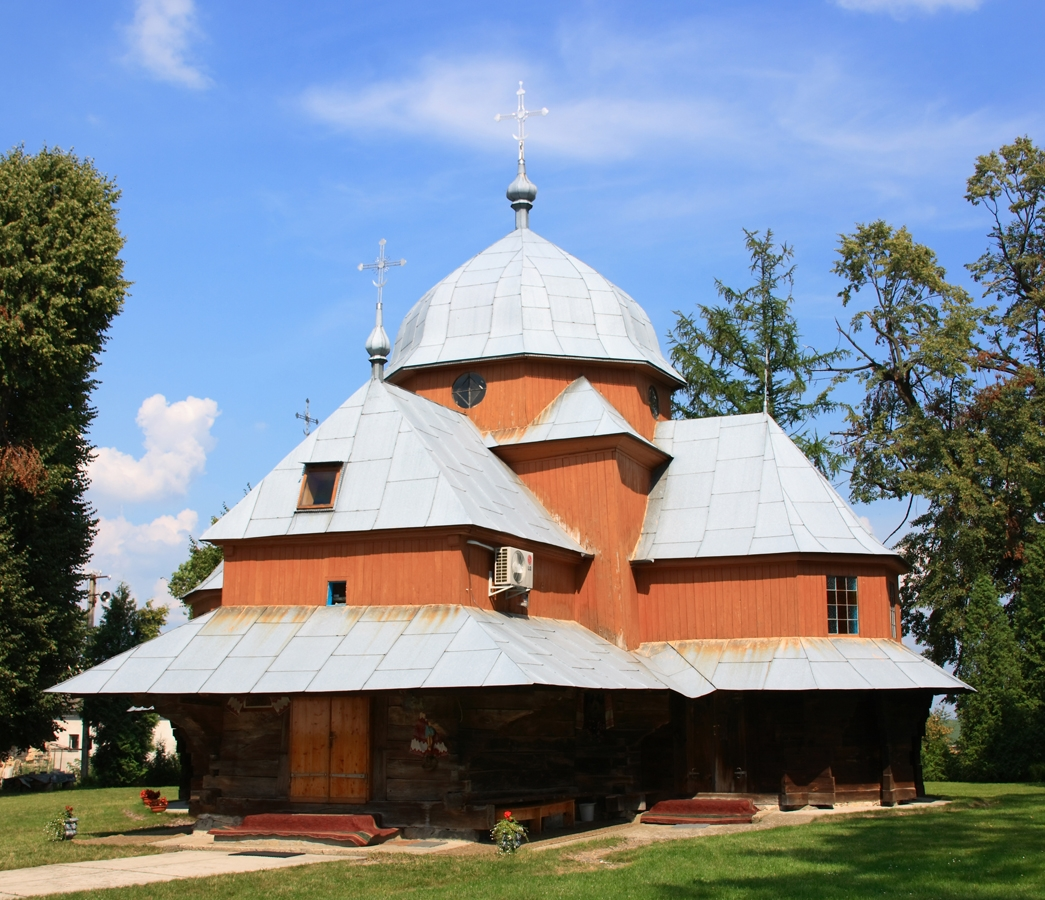
Wooden church of Nativity of the Theotokos

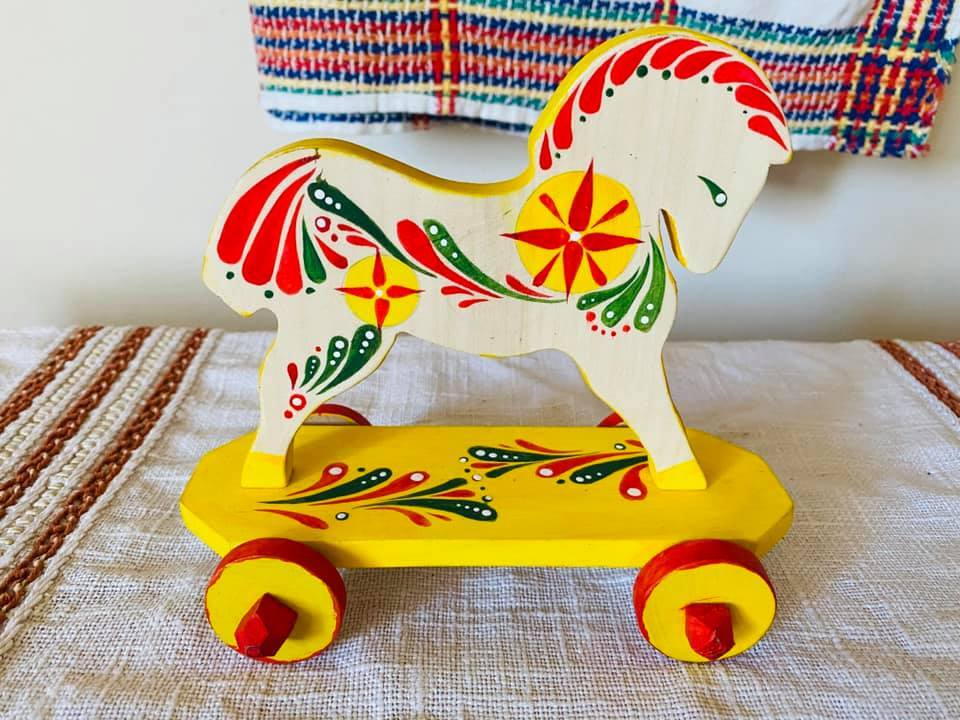
Yavoriv toy

== International relations ==
=== Twin towns — Sister cities ===
Yavoriv is twinned with:

City	Country	Year
Jarosław	Poland	2006
Węgorzewo	Poland	
Lubaczów	Poland	
Havant	United Kingdom	
Trakai	Lithuania	

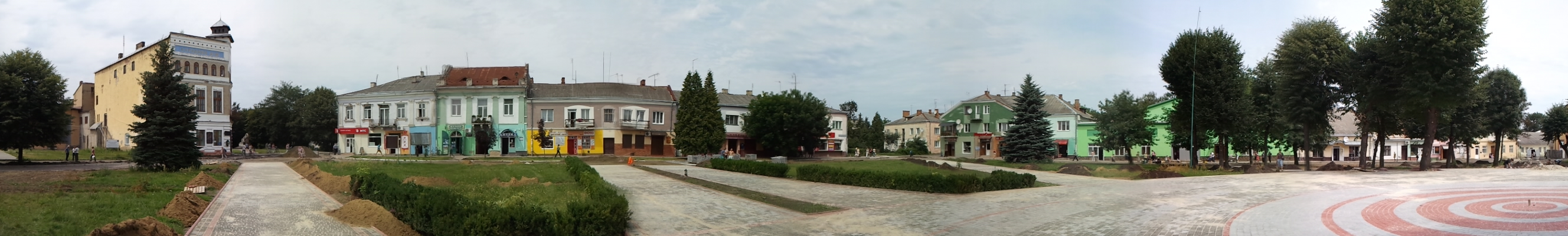
Panorama of the city center

== See also ==
- Battle of Jaworow
