= Yavoriv Raion =

Subdivision of Lviv Oblast, Ukraine

Yavoriv Raion Яворівський район
- Raion
- Flag Coat of arms

- Coordinates: 49°58′47″N 23°30′56″E
- Country: Ukraine
- Oblast: Lviv Oblast
- Established: 1939
- Admin. center: Yavoriv
- Subdivisions: 6 hromadas

Area
  - Total: 2,373 km^{2} (916 sq mi)

Population (2022)
  - Total: 177,662
  - Density: 74.87/km^{2} (193.9/sq mi)
- Time zone: UTC+02:00 (EET)
  - Summer (DST): UTC+03:00 (EEST)
- Postal index: 81000–81092
- Area code: 380-3259
- Website: Yavorivskyi Raion

Yavoriv Raion (Ukrainian: Яворівський район) is a raion (district) in Lviv Oblast in western Ukraine. Its administrative center is Yavoriv. It was established in 1939. Its estimated population is 177,662 (2022 estimate).

On 18 July 2020, as part of the administrative reform of Ukraine, the number of raions of Lviv Oblast was reduced to seven, and the area of Yavoriv Raion was significantly expanded. One abolished raion, Mostyska Raion, was merged into Yavoriv Raion. The January 2020 estimate of the raion population was 126,115 (2020 est.).

== Subdivisions ==
=== Current ===
After the reform in July 2020, the raion consisted of 6 hromadas:

- Ivano-Frankove settlement hromada with the administration in the rural settlement of Ivano-Frankove, retained from Yavoriv Raion;
- Mostyska urban hromada with the administration in the city of Mostyska, transferred from Mostyska Raion;
- Novoiavorivsk urban hromada with the administration in the city of Novoiavorivsk, retained from Yavoriv Raion;
- Shehyni rural hromada with the administration in the selo of Shehyni, transferred from Mostyska Raion;
- Sudova Vyshnia urban hromada with the administration in the city of Sudova Vyshnia, transferred from Mostyska Raion;
- Yavoriv urban hromada with the administration in the city of Yavoriv, retained from Yavoriv Raion.

=== Before 2020 ===
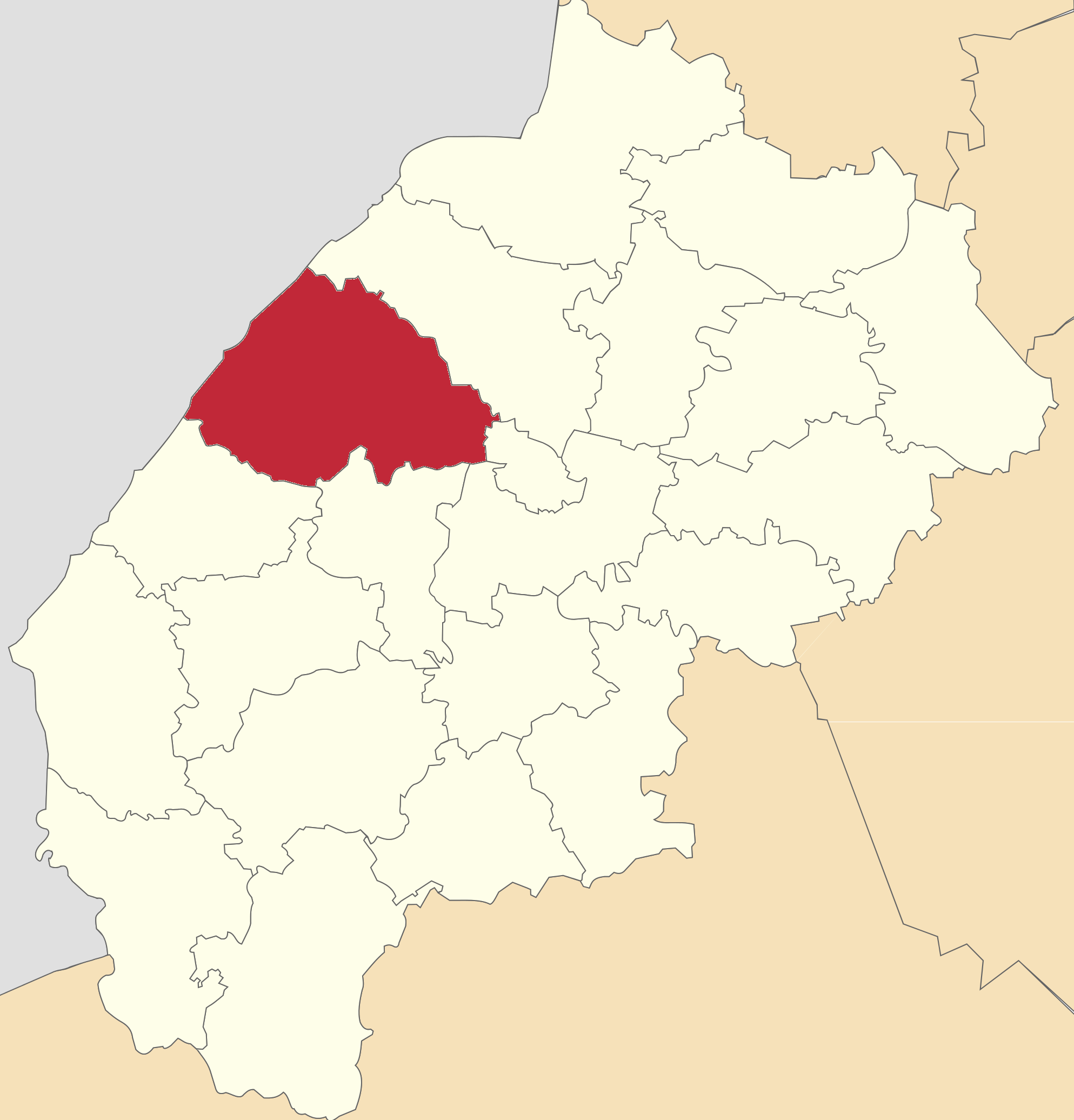
Yavoriv Raion in Lviv Oblast (1966-2020)

Before the 2020 reform, the raion consisted of three hromadas,

- Ivano-Frankove settlement hromada with the administration in Ivano-Frankove;
- Novoiavorivsk urban hromada with the administration in Novoiavorivsk;
- Yavoriv urban hromada with the administration in Yavoriv.

== Demographics ==
According to the 2001 Ukrainian census:

2001 census results
Ethnicity	Number	Percentage
Ukrainians	121,600	98.6%
Russians	1,300	1.1%
Poles	100	0.1%
Total:	123,300	

== See also ==
- Administrative divisions of Lviv Oblast
