= Oberwölz Umgebung =

- Former municipality
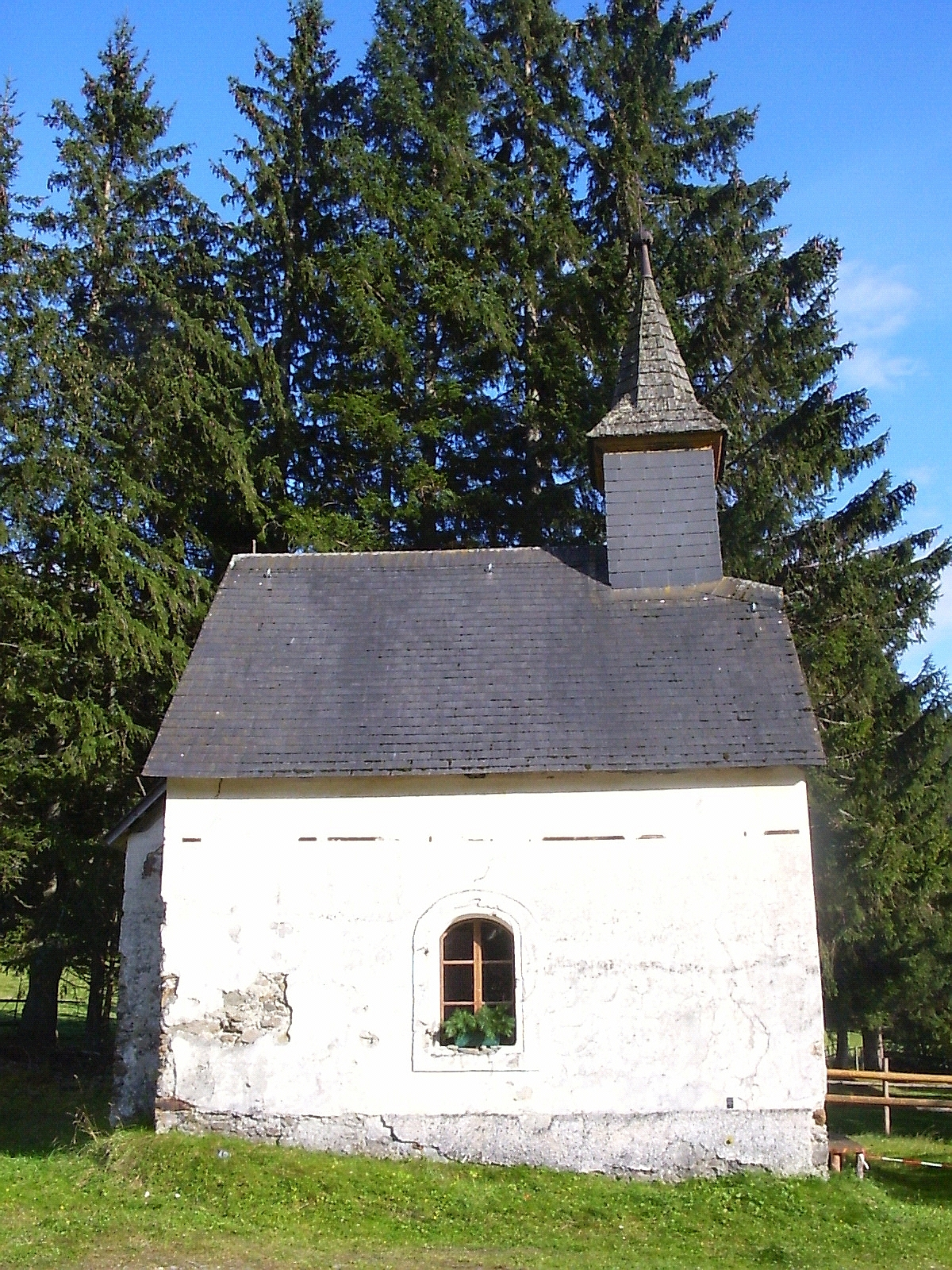
- Chapel in Oberwölz Umgebung

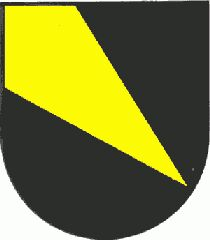
- Coat of arms

- Location within Austria
- Coordinates: 47°13′00″N 14°17′00″E
- Country: Austria
- State: Styria
- District: Murau

Area
  - Total: 94.78 km^{2} (36.59 sq mi)
- Elevation: 1,100 m (3,600 ft)

Population (1 January 2016)
  - Total: 777
  - Density: 8.20/km^{2} (21.2/sq mi)
- Time zone: UTC+1 (CET)
  - Summer (DST): UTC+2 (CEST)
- Postal code: 8832, 8831
- Area code: 03581
- Vehicle registration: MU
- Website: www.oberwoelz-umgebung.steiermark.at

Oberwölz Umgebung is a former municipality in the district of Murau in Styria, Austria. Since the 2015 Styria municipal structural reform, it is part of the municipality Oberwölz.

== Geography ==
The municipality lies about 15 km northeast of the town of Murau.
