= Oberwölz Stadt =

- Former municipality
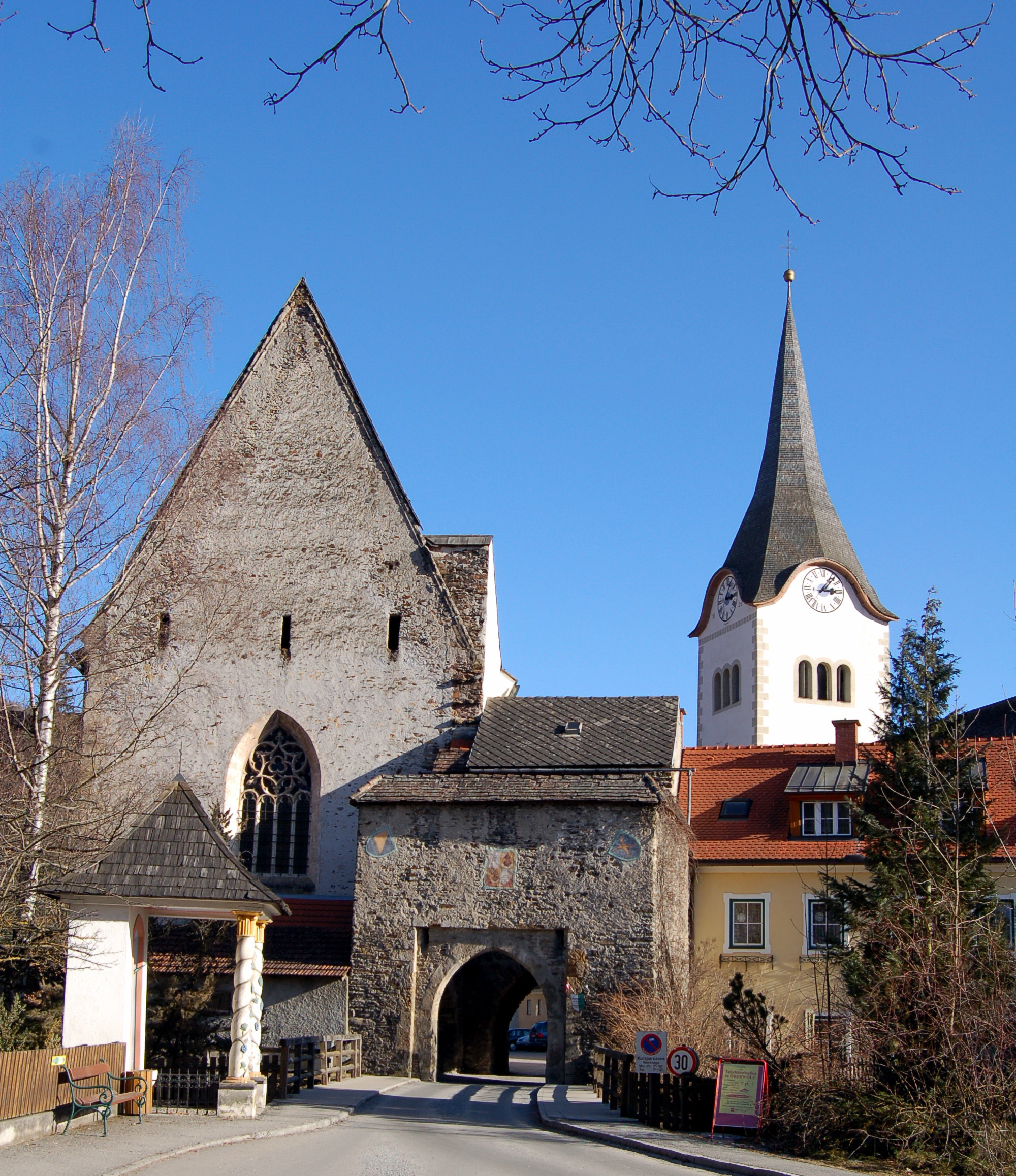
- Hintereggertor, St. Sigismund church and St. Martin parish church

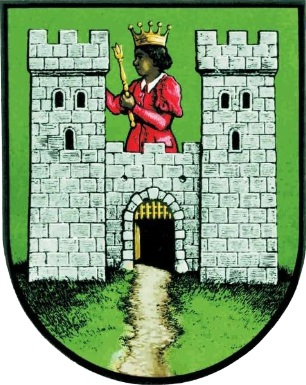
- Coat of arms

- Location within Austria
- Coordinates: 47°12′00″N 14°17′00″E
- Country: Austria
- State: Styria
- District: Murau

Area
  - Total: 4.64 km^{2} (1.79 sq mi)
- Elevation: 830 m (2,720 ft)

Population (1 January 2016)
  - Total: 987
  - Density: 213/km^{2} (551/sq mi)
- Time zone: UTC+1 (CET)
  - Summer (DST): UTC+2 (CEST)
- Postal code: 8832
- Area code: 03581
- Vehicle registration: MU
- Website: www.oberwoelz-stadt.steiermark.at

Oberwölz Stadt is a town and a former municipality in the district of Murau in the Austrian state of Styria. Since the 2015 Styria municipal structural reform, it is part of the municipality Oberwölz.

== Population ==
Historical population
Year	Pop.	±%
1869	747	—
1880	762	+2.0%
1890	769	+0.9%
1900	731	−4.9%
1910	681	−6.8%
1923	635	−6.8%
1934	616	−3.0%
1939	644	+4.5%
1951	844	+31.1%
1961	944	+11.8%
1971	908	−3.8%
1981	979	+7.8%
1991	1,026	+4.8%
2001	1,055	+2.8%
2011	971	−8.0%
