= Winklern bei Oberwölz =

- Former municipality
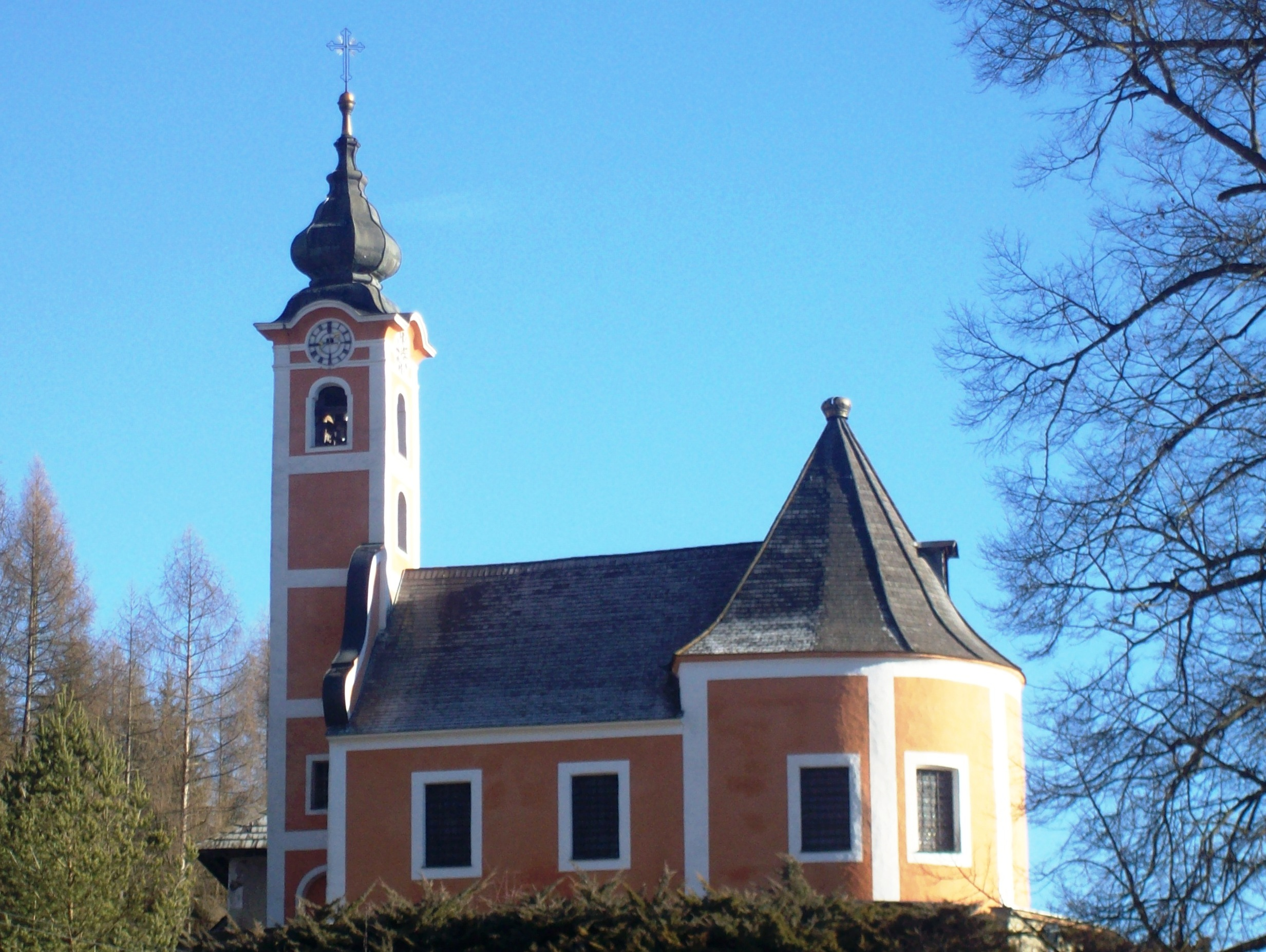
- Church in Winklern

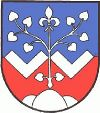
- Coat of arms

- Location within Austria
- Coordinates: 47°12′05″N 14°14′30″E
- Country: Austria
- State: Styria
- District: Murau

Area
  - Total: 68.75 km^{2} (26.54 sq mi)
- Elevation: 879 m (2,884 ft)

Population (1 January 2016)
  - Total: 856
  - Density: 12.5/km^{2} (32.2/sq mi)
- Time zone: UTC+1 (CET)
  - Summer (DST): UTC+2 (CEST)
- Postal code: 8832
- Area code: 03581
- Vehicle registration: MU
- Website: www.winklern-oberwoelz.steiermark.at

Winklern bei Oberwölz is a former municipality in the district of Murau in the Austrian state of Styria. Since the 2015 Styria municipal structural reform, it is part of the municipality Oberwölz.

== Geography ==
Winklern lies about 12 km northeast of Murau.
