= Oberwölz =

- Municipality
- Coat of arms

- Location within Austria
- Coordinates: 47°12′10″N 14°16′51″E
- Country: Austria
- State: Styria
- District: Murau

Government
  - Mayor: Hannes Schmidhofer (ÖVP)

Area
  - Total: 210.29 km^{2} (81.19 sq mi)

Population (2018-01-01)
  - Total: 2,960
  - Density: 14.1/km^{2} (36.5/sq mi)
- Time zone: UTC+1 (CET)
  - Summer (DST): UTC+2 (CEST)
- Postal code: 8831, 8832
- Area code: 03581, 03587
- Website: Homepage der Region Oberwölz

Oberwölz is a city since 2015 in the Murau District of Styria, Austria. The city was founded as part of the Styria municipal structural reform, at the end of 2014, with the merger of the former independent municipalities Oberwölz Stadt, Oberwölz Umgebung, Schönberg-Lachtal and Winklern bei Oberwölz, whereby the new municipality became ranked as a city ("Stadtgemeinde").

== Geography ==
=== Municipality arrangement ===
The city territory includes the following eleven sections (populations as of 1 Jan 2015):

- Eselsberg (138)
- Hinterburg (120)
- Krumegg (56)
- Mainhartsdorf (374)
- Oberwölz (Stadt) (374)
- Raiming (306)
- Salchau (180)
- Schönberg-Lachtal (418)
- Schöttl (104)
- Vorstadt (603)
- Winklern bei Oberwölz (334).

The municipality consists of the Katastralgemeinden Hinterburg, Oberwölz, Raiming, Salchau, Schönberg, Schöttl and Winklern.

== Culture and sights ==
=== Overall ===
- Sagenweg Sagenhaftes Wölzertal
- Heimatmuseum
- Blasmusikmuseum

=== Oberwölz Stadt ===
- Hauptplatz: from the Middle Ages
- Stadtmauer und Wehrtürme: the city walls, three city gates, and the defense towers are constructed
- Spitalskirche church (Filialkirche hl. Sigismund beim Spital): built under Bishop Nikodemus della Scala (1421–1443). The inscription, under the master builder bust, reads with the name "Hans Jersleben". After the fire of 1480, there was renovation of the vaulted ceiling and tracery windows. Remarkable stonework at the gallery until 1500.

=== Oberwölz Umgebung ===
- Fischsee-Wasserfall, waterfall from the Fischsee lake in the Kar der Schöttl Alm
- Glattjochkapelle chapel
- Eselsberger Alm
- Rastplatz der Gemeinde Oberwölz Umgebung: In the year 2006, it was built near the Lindwurm-Station of the Rundwanderweges Sagenhaftes Wölzertal. The granite blocks of the Rastplatz (see photo) symbolize 4 Katastralgemeinden (Salchau, Schöttl, Raiming and Hinterburg), the flying water indicates their union.
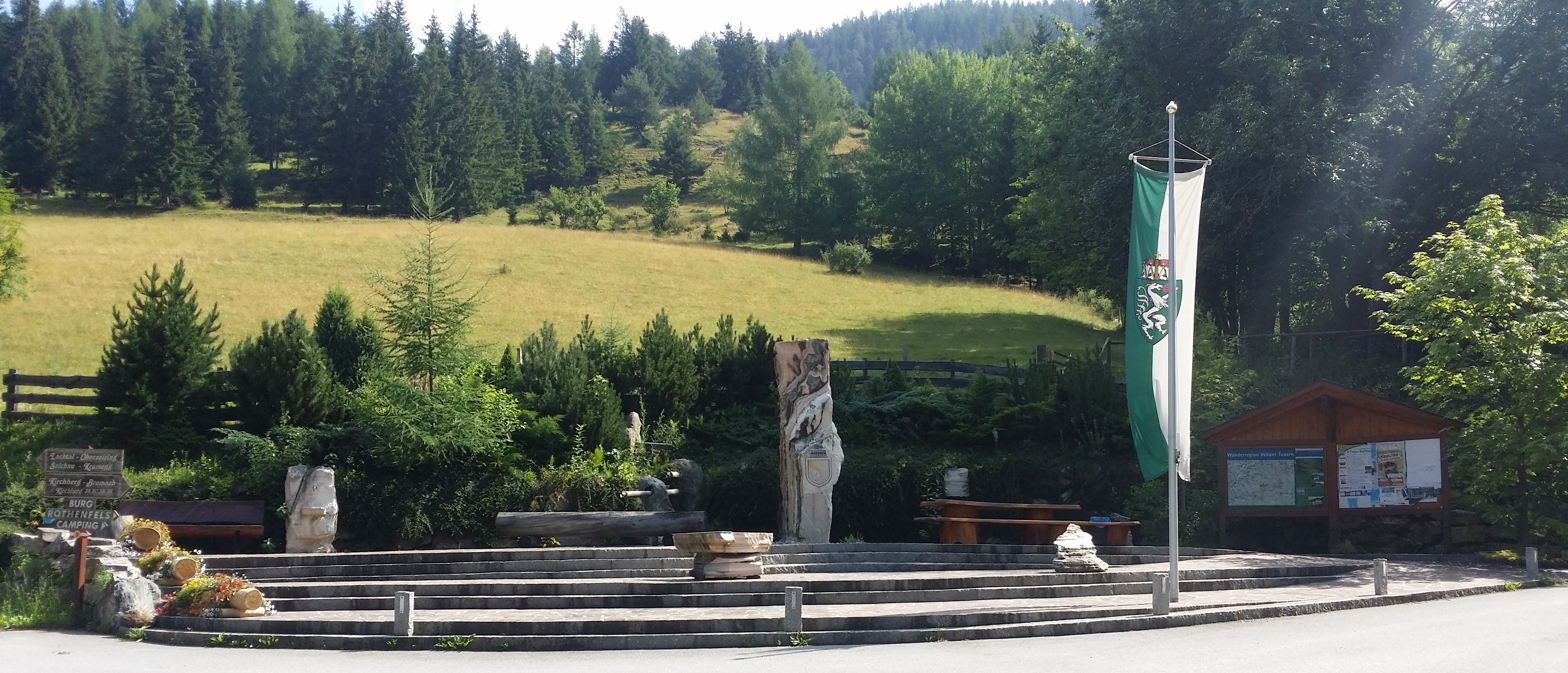
Rastplatz Oberwölz Umgebung

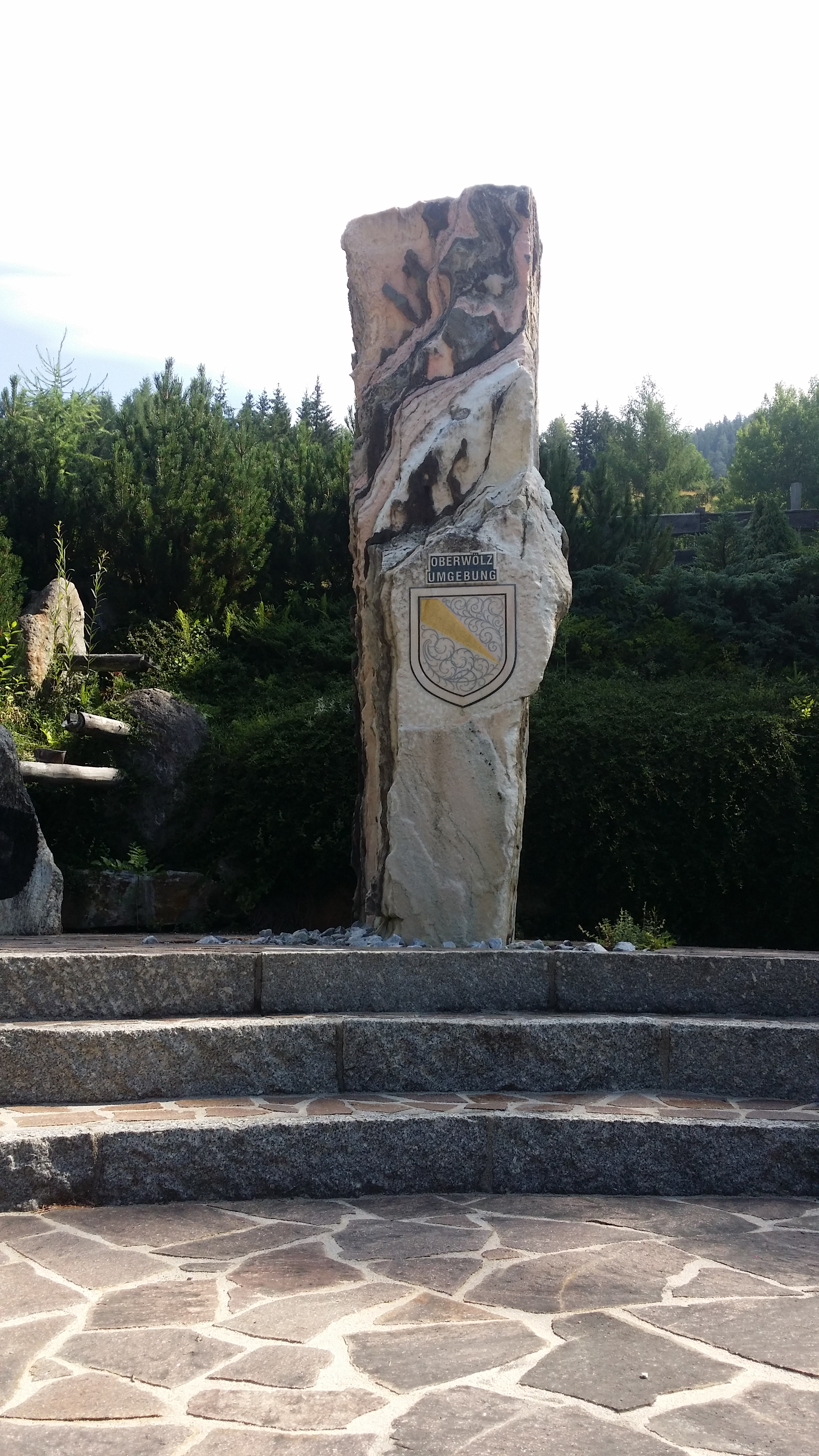
Granite block with the crest of town Oberwölz Umgebung

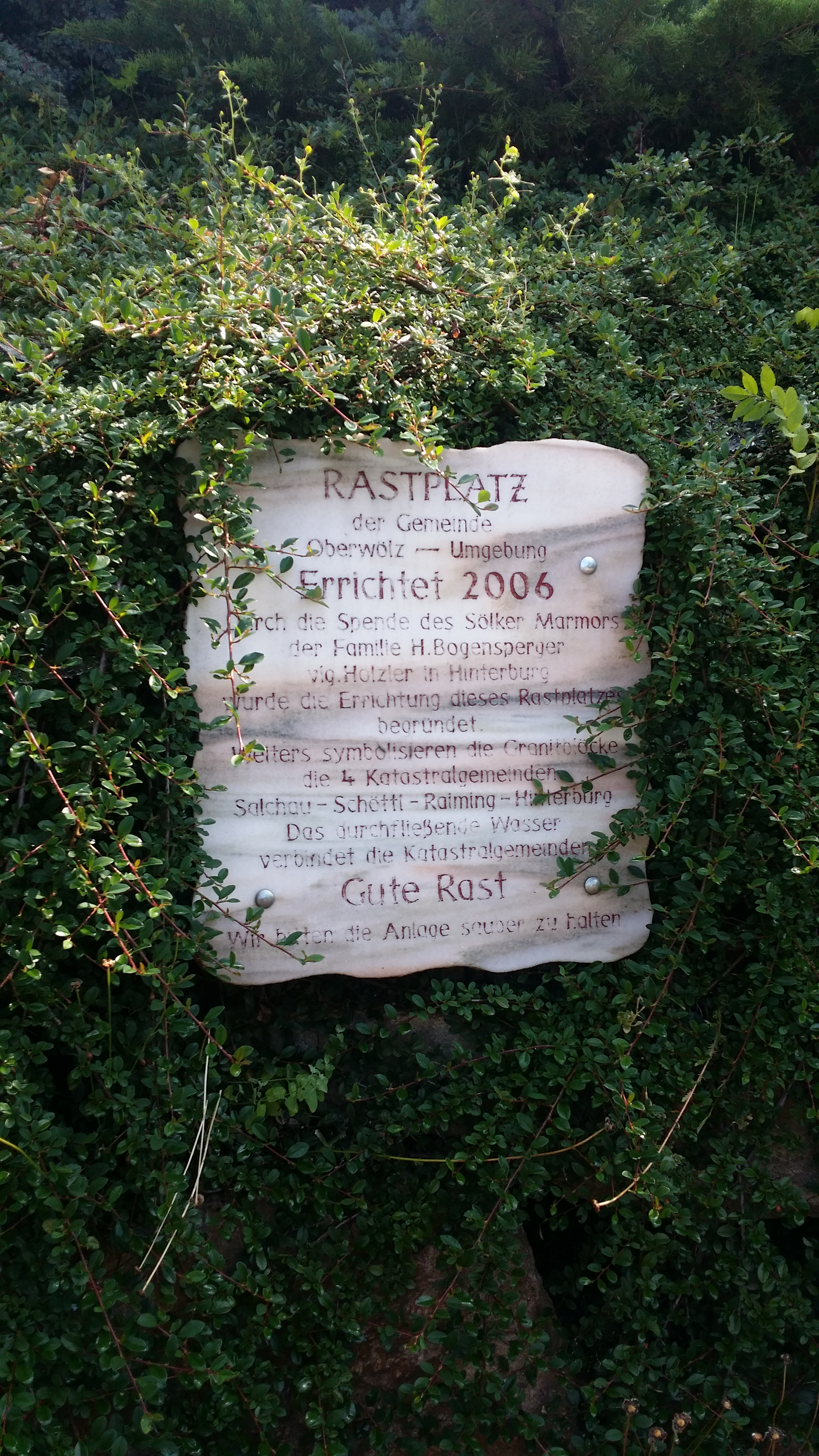
History of the Rastplatz

== Sports and pastimes ==
- Outdoor swimming pool with water slide, sports pool, children's pool, diving tower
- 4 Tennis courts
- 2 football pitches
- Skatepark
- Asphaltstockbahn
- Fitness course
- High ropes course
- Cross country ski trail
- Wintersports in ski area of Lachtal
