= Battle of Klushino (painting) =

1620 painting by Szymon Boguszowicz

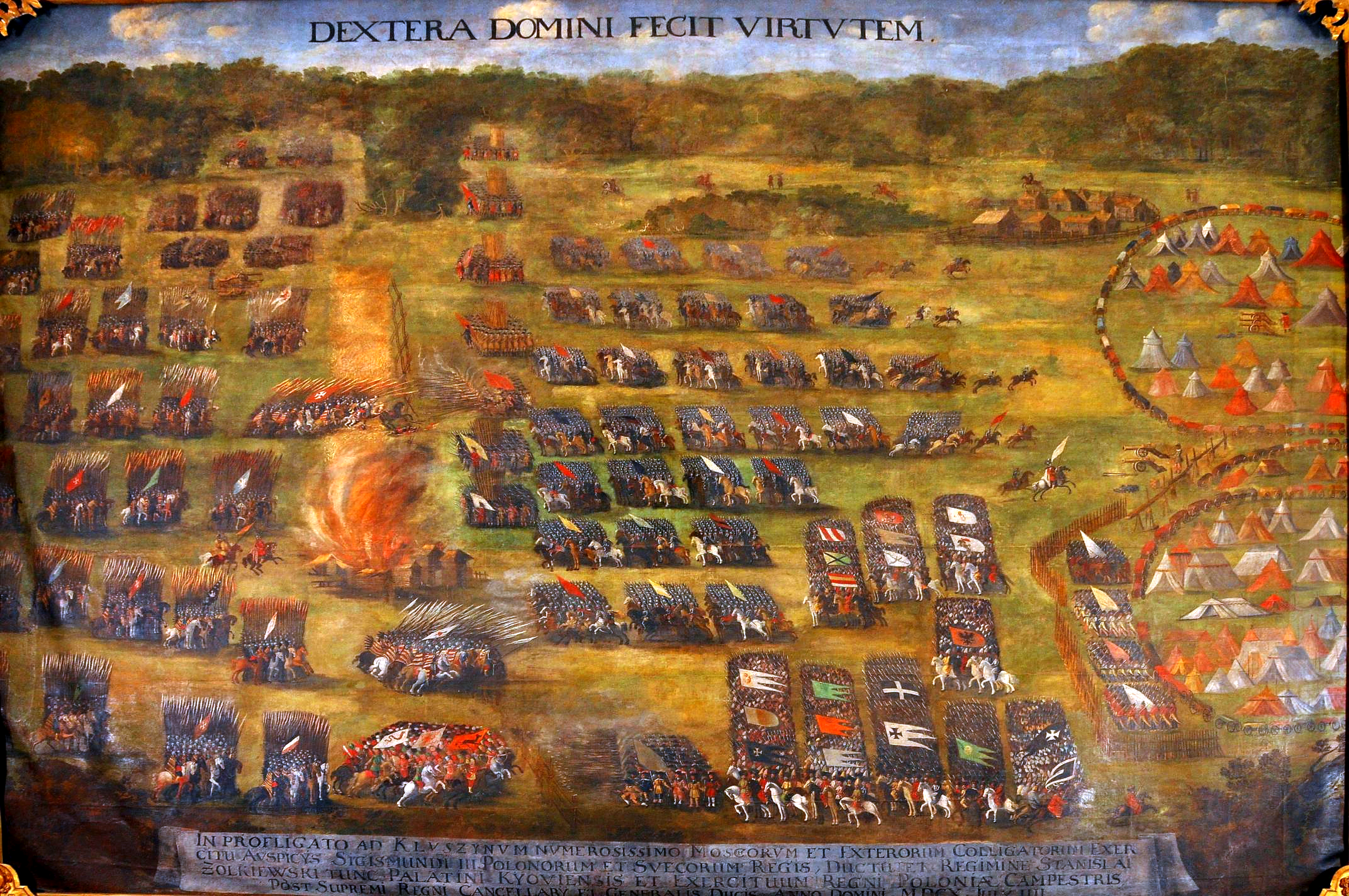
- Artist: Szymon Boguszowicz
- Year: 1620
- Medium: oil on canvas
- Dimensions: 600 × 600 cm or 580 × 690 cm
- Location: Borys Voznytsky Lviv National Art Gallery, Olesko

Battle of Klushino is an oil painting created in 1620 by the Polish-Armenian artist Szymon Boguszowicz (1575–1648).

It was commissioned by and painted under the supervision of Grand Crown Hetman Stanisław Żółkiewski, who achieved victory in the Battle of Klushino on 4 July 1610, where he defeated the Russo-Swedish forces. The painting, commemorating this triumph, was intended for St. Lawrence's Church in Zhovkva, where it remained until the second half of the 20th century.

The artwork is an important iconographic source for the military history of the early 17th century.

== Circumstances of creation ==
The painting Battle of Klushino was created on the commission of Stanisław Żółkiewski, intended to be placed in St. Lawrence's Church in Zhovkva, which was conceived as his family mausoleum and a monument to the glory of Polish arms. Żółkiewski considered the victory at Klushino, as well as the entire Moscow campaign, to be his greatest achievement. This explains the choice of this particular theme for the commissioned work. The painting offered a more credible and accessible way to commemorate the military success compared to a written account, especially since it was created under the guidance of the Hetman himself, following his suggestions.

The authorship of the painting is attributed to Szymon Boguszowicz, an Armenian artist from Lviv. Having previously worked for the Mniszech family (he was a witness to the coronation of Marina Mniszech as Tsarina and created several paintings related to the event), he became associated with Żółkiewski's court in 1620.

Aleksander Czołowski was the first to identify Boguszowicz as the artist in 1904. Later, Tadeusz Mańkowski and Władysław Tomkiewicz also agreed with this attribution. One piece of evidence supporting Boguszowicz's authorship is a letter from Żółkiewski to the authorities of Lviv, dated 20 May 1620, in which the Hetman requested a temporary release for the painter from his civic duties in order to focus on the commission in Zhovkva (the content of the work was not mentioned).

Although the painting is sometimes still attributed to an unknown artist, the idea of Boguszowicz's authorship has become widely accepted as a certainty or a strong assumption. The creation of the painting is dated to 1620 or, in some cases, to the period "around 1620" or "before 1620". The work was commissioned shortly before Żółkiewski's Moldavian campaign and his death, as it is likely that the Hetman sought to immortalize his triumph before embarking on the new campaign (he likely did not plan a series of paintings).

== Description ==
The painting Battle of Klushino is a monumental oil work on canvas, measuring approximately 600 × 600 cm (or 580 × 690 cm). The battle is depicted from a high vantage point, almost as if seen "from the sky", in a simultaneous view (showing a sequence of events) that spans the entire battlefield.

The landscape is represented schematically, with vast empty fields separated by fences and burning village huts. The upper part of the image is framed by a view of wooded areas and rolling hills. To the right, a settlement is visible, next to a Swedish military camp with wagons arranged around tents. Below it is a larger Russian camp, surrounded by wagons and secured by barricades, behind which streltsy are positioned.

On the left side of the painting, Polish forces are depicted, with their banners arranged in a checkerboard formation, extending into multiple lines. The majority of the Polish cavalry is composed of hussars with long lances, small standards, and distinctive armament. The hussars are shown wearing half-armour and helmets, with striped cloaks (resembling kilims) draped over their shoulders, and some riders have low, black single wings mounted on their saddles, likely attached to the saddle arch. Each hussar banner is square-shaped, bearing a cross pattée, a saltire, or multicolored stripes.

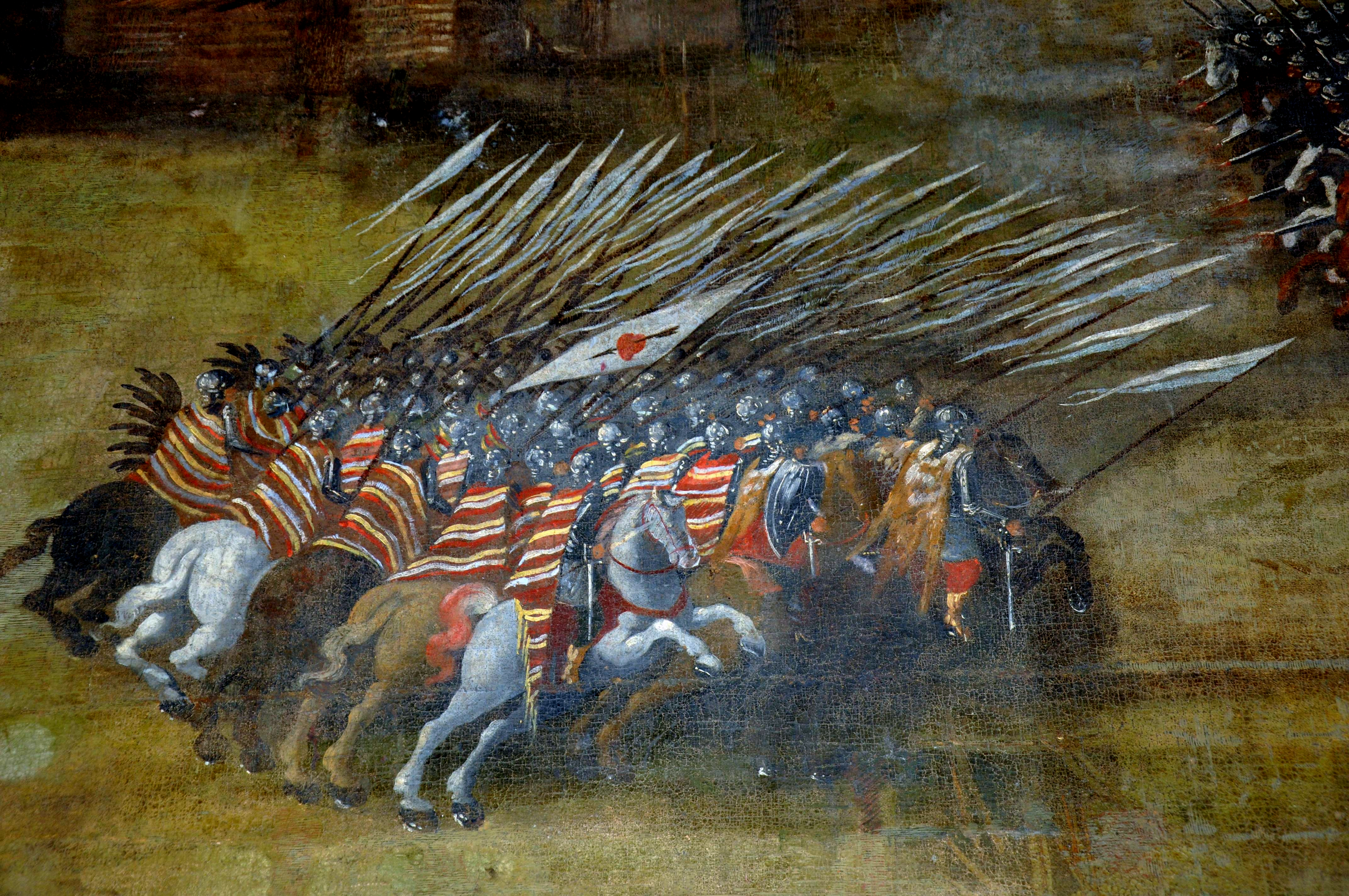
Charge of the Polish Hussars in the Battle of Klushino. Fragment of the painting Battle of Klushino by Szymon Boguszowicz

In the center of the painting, a burning village is shown, and the hussar banners charge towards the enemy in a compact formation with lowered lances. Stanisław Żółkiewski is depicted in front of the burning village, not as a triumphant leader towering over others, but as one among his cavalry, only slightly standing out from the soldiers. The Hetman, mounted on a bay horse, is distinguished by his golden hussar helmet, red żupan, and the bulawa he holds, pointing towards the direction of attack. Below one of the hussar banners, in the foreground, is a unit of light cavalry without lances, bearing a standard adorned with a serpent.

On the right wing of the enemy forces, the Swedish army is shown. In the first line, there is infantry arranged in squares, with pikemen in the center surrounded by musketeers in long coats and black hats. Behind them is the heavy cavalry in western-style armor, wearing helmets and cuirasses, with visible arquebuses and rapiers. Above the Swedish troops, banners are visible, mostly red or white. The Swedish infantry is shown defending behind barricades, with musketeers kneeling and firing volleys, while the barricades are being destroyed in several places.

On the left side of the allied forces, Russian boyars are depicted, wearing pointed hats or helmets and long coats. The commanders are distinguished by kalpaks. Behind the cavalry, Russian musketeers, dressed similarly to the riders, are armed with hand cannons and polearms. In the lower right corner, a Russian rider in rich attire is seen leaving the battlefield – this figure is Dmitry Shuisky, the Russian commander.

The upper part of the painting features the Latin inscription Dextera Domini Fecit Virtutem, which translates to "The hand of the Lord has made strength". The lower part contains another Latin inscription describing the battle, its date, and the commanders involved. This inscription reads:

To defeat at Klushino the largest Russian and foreign allied armies, during the reign of Sigismund III of Poland and King of Sweden, under the leadership and command of Stanisław Żółkiewski, at that time the Voivode of Kyiv and the Hetman of the Crown, later the Great Chancellor and Hetman, in the year of our Lord 1610, on the 4th of July.

== Provenance ==
The painting was placed in St. Lawrence's Church in Zhovkva as intended. In later years, it was joined by canvases commissioned by John III Sobieski, depicting his victories. These included The Battle of Chocim by Andrzej Stech (likely in collaboration with Ferdinand van Kessel, 1674–1679) and two paintings by Martino Altomonte: The Battle of Vienna (1693–1694) and The Battle of Párkány (1693–1695).

After World War II, the church in Zhovkva was closed and repurposed as a storage facility. The Battle of Klushino (along with the aforementioned paintings) remained there until the 1970s, when, on the initiative of Borys Voznytsky, director of the Borys Voznytsky Lviv National Art Gallery, it was removed and transported to the gallery's storage facility in the former Capuchin monastery near Olesko Castle. Following restoration, the painting was displayed in the former Capuchin church.

== Merits of the painting ==
The Battle of Klushino serves as an example of monumental battle painting. Until the works of Jan Matejko, it was the largest painting created in Poland in terms of dimensions. The painting is considered part of the 17th-century battle painting tradition, employing compositional solutions typical of this genre. However, Władysław Tomkiewicz suggested it deviates from contemporary norms. He argued that the piece lacks a cohesive composition emphasizing a decisive moment or the figure of the commander. Instead, he speculated the painting might have been a horizontal frieze, cut into strips and reassembled. This theory has not gained widespread acceptance.

Certain compositional features link Boguszowicz's painting to works like Battle of Orsha and Battle of Kircholm from Sassenage, including its bird's-eye perspective, realistic detailing, and simultaneous depiction of events. Additionally, its arrangement of armed groups in elongated zones recalls aspects of Battle of Lepanto by Tommaso Dolabella. However, its connection to another of Dolabella's works, Battle of Klushino from the Royal Castle in Warsaw, remains unclear.

From an artistic perspective, Boguszowicz's painting falls short of being considered a masterpiece. Its quality and style are noticeably inferior to the aforementioned works and appear rudimentary compared to depictions of Sobieski's victories. Critics have noted its provincial and amateurish characteristics, evident in its schematic presentation of the battle, lack of cohesive integration, and awkward execution, such as representing military units as blocks of heads with full figures only visible in the foreground. The artist struggled with perspective, creating anomalies such as a fence that resembles a ladder in the central part of the canvas. These shortcomings were attributed to Žółkiewski's restrictive instructions, the painter's lack of firsthand experience of the battle, and limited access to its detailed plans.

However, the painting has notable artistic strengths. The depiction of horses in various poses – calm, trotting, galloping – has been praised as among the best in Polish battle painting. The composition is diversified through varied group activities, with some units standing still while others are attacking or engaging the enemy. Smoke and artillery projectiles further animate the scene. The grouping of figures on the canvas has even been likened to Eastern Orthodox iconography. Above all, the painting’s greatest merit lies in its realism and attention to detail. The straightforwardness and schematic approach help viewers imagine the battle’s events, subordinating artistic aspects to the rules of military representation.

Despite its artistic flaws, Battle of Klushino is regarded as an essential example of Polish battle painting, with invaluable iconographic significance for understanding early modern Polish, Muscovite, and Western European military practices. The painter faithfully portrayed the combatants' weaponry and attire, offering a simultaneous depiction of various battle episodes. The arrangement of the Crown Army's battle formation, with each hussar banner as a distinct unit under its own standard, was also accurately rendered. However, some discrepancies were noted compared to written accounts, such as the placement of Muscovite marksmen behind the boyar cavalry, which differs from historical descriptions.

== Bibliography ==
- Gębarowicz, Mieczysław (1981). Początki malarstwa historycznego w Polsce [The Beginnings of Historical Painting in Poland] (in Polish). Wrocław: Zakład Narodowy im. Ossolińskich. ISBN 83-04-00719-3.
- Polaczek, Janusz (2006). Żółkiew. Miejsce kultu wodzów i dziejów wojennych Polaków [Zhovkva: A Place of Worship for Polish Leaders and Military History] (in Polish). Przemyśl: Przemyskie Centrum Kultury i Nauki. ISBN 83-89092-96-4.
- Żygulski, Zdzisław (1994). Hetmani Rzeczypospolitej [Hetmans of the Commonwealth] (in Polish). Kraków: Krajowa Agencja Wydawnicza. ISBN 83-03-03630-0.
- Żygulski, Zdzisław (1996). Sławne bitwy w sztuce [Famous Battles in Art] (in Polish). Warsaw: Pagina. ISBN 83-86351-07-1.
