= Siege of Weissenstein =

1602 military conflict in Estonia during Polish-Swedish War

- Part of the Polish–Swedish War (1600–1611)
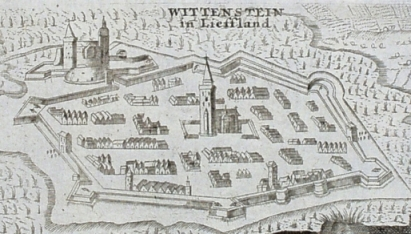
- Paide (Weissenstein) and it's castle
Date	31 May – 30 September 1602
Location	Weissenstein, present-day Estonia 58°53′23″N 25°34′20″E
Result	Polish-Lithuanian victory

Belligerents
Sweden	Polish–Lithuanian Commonwealth

Commanders and leaders
Unknown	Jan Zamoyski; Stanisław Żółkiewski

Strength
700	2,000

The siege of Weissenstein took place between 31 May and 30 September 1602, during the Polish–Swedish War of 1600–1611. Two weeks after the capture of Fellin, Grand Crown Hetman Jan Zamoyski led the Polish-Lithuanian army of 2,000 troops to besiege Weissenstein (now known as Paide in Estonia). Weissenstein, a major transportation hub in Estonia, was a site of strategic importance to both Poland and Sweden. Located among the marshes and built during the Teutonic period, the castle had strong artillery and was defended by 700 soldiers, local peasants, and townspeople. Weissenstein was a walled city with 30-meter towers at the corners and high bastions, and thus presented the attacking force with a significant barrier to success, even with siege works.

== Siege ==
The Polish army began by blockading the fortress. Because the Swedish army was getting relief from Reval, the Poles sent Stanisław Żółkiewski there. The defeat of the Swedes at the Battle of Reval on 30 June ended the Weissenstein defender's hopes of attaining further help. When their long-awaited regular infantry arrived in August, the Poles started to build siege works. The start of the operation was difficult, as the artillery was unable to break the powerful bastions.

Heavy rains that turned the surrounding area into a great morass hampered the siege. The forces began to succumb to disease. When a captured Swedish prisoner revealed the northern curtain wall of the fortress was weakened, Zamoyski immediately ordered the construction of a wooden platform in front of the curtain wall where the artillery pieces could set up. The Swedes noted the potential danger and fired their guns at the newly-built platform. A fierce artillery battle was the result. On the night of 26–27 September, four heavy guns were placed on the platform. The guns opened fire the next morning, weakening the curtain wall, which began to collapse. After a few hours there was a huge breakthrough. The Swedes, seeing the hopelessness of their situation, capitulated on 30 September.
