= Krzysztof Wiesiołowski =

17th-century Polish nobleman

- Krzysztof Wiesiołowski
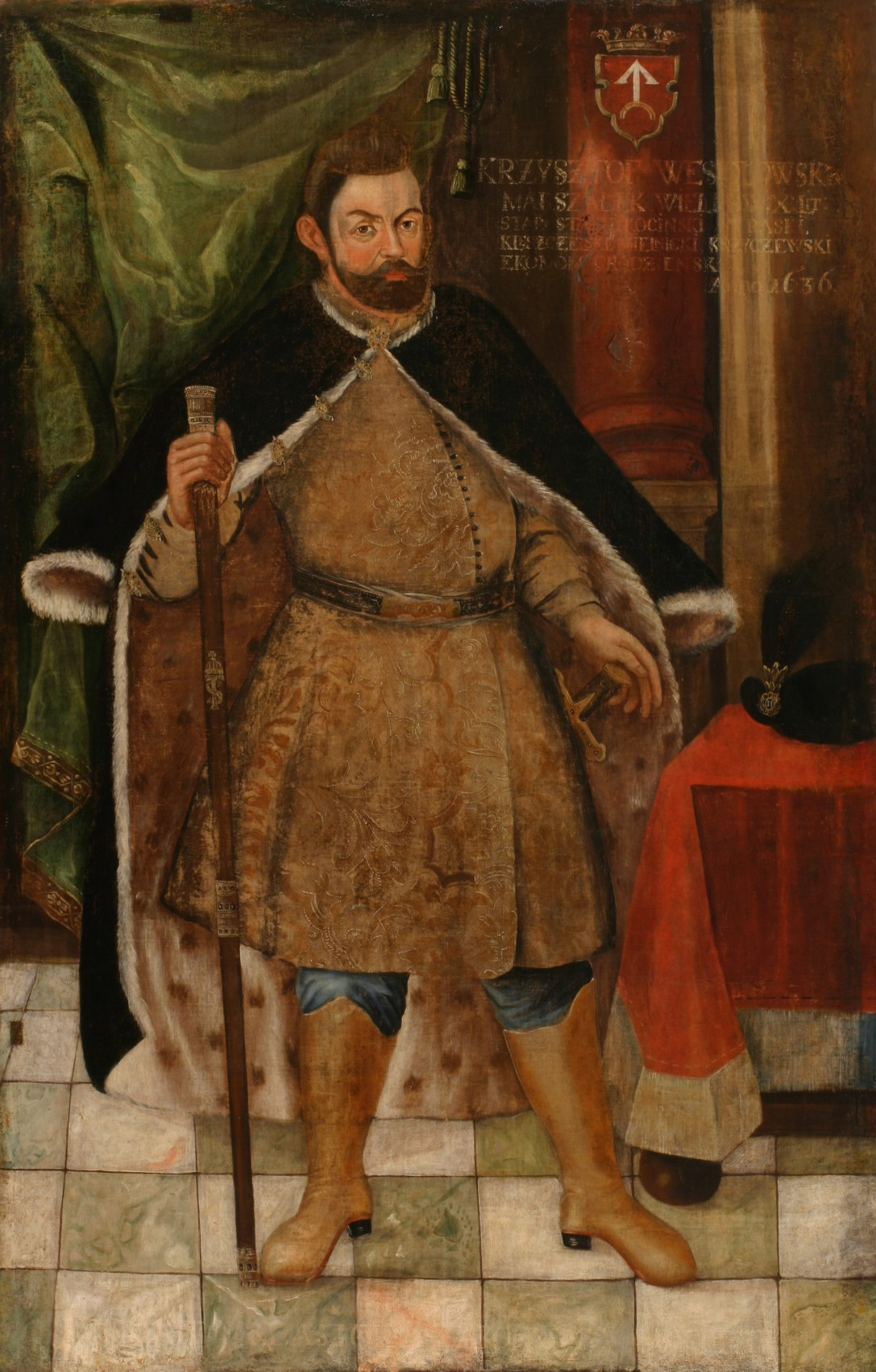
- Coat of arms: Ogończyk
- Full name: Krzysztof Wiesiołowski herbu Ogończyk
- Died: 19 April 1637
- Family: Wiesiołowski
- Consort: Aleksandra Marianna Wiesiołowska
- Issue: none
- Father: Piotr Wiesiolowski
- Mother: Zofia Lubomirska

Krzysztof Wiesiołowski (died 1637) was a Polish nobleman, starost of Tykocin and Supraśl, Stolnik of Lithuania and Ciwun of Wilno before 1620, Court Marshal of Lithuania from 1619, Krajczy of Lithuania from 1620, and Grand Marshal of Lithuania from 1635.

He was Marshal of the Sejm from 15 January to 26 February 1609 and 13 February to 13 March 1618 in Warsaw.

== Coat of arms ==
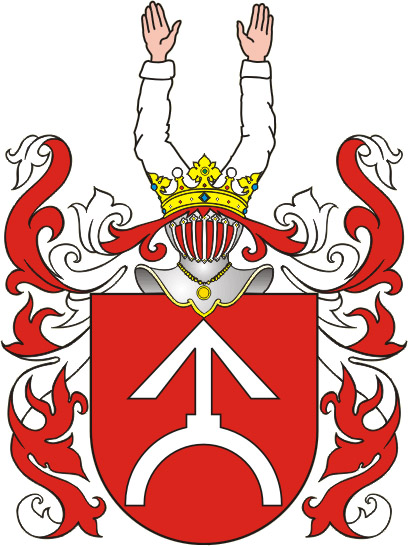
Ogończyk coat of arms

== Bibliography ==
- http://edukacja.sejm.gov.pl/historia-sejmu/marszalkowie-sejmu/i-rzeczpospolita.html
- Ks. A. Kochański, 526 lat dziejów miasta Tykocina na tle historii Polski, Białystok 2010
