= Aleksandra Marianna Wiesiołowska =

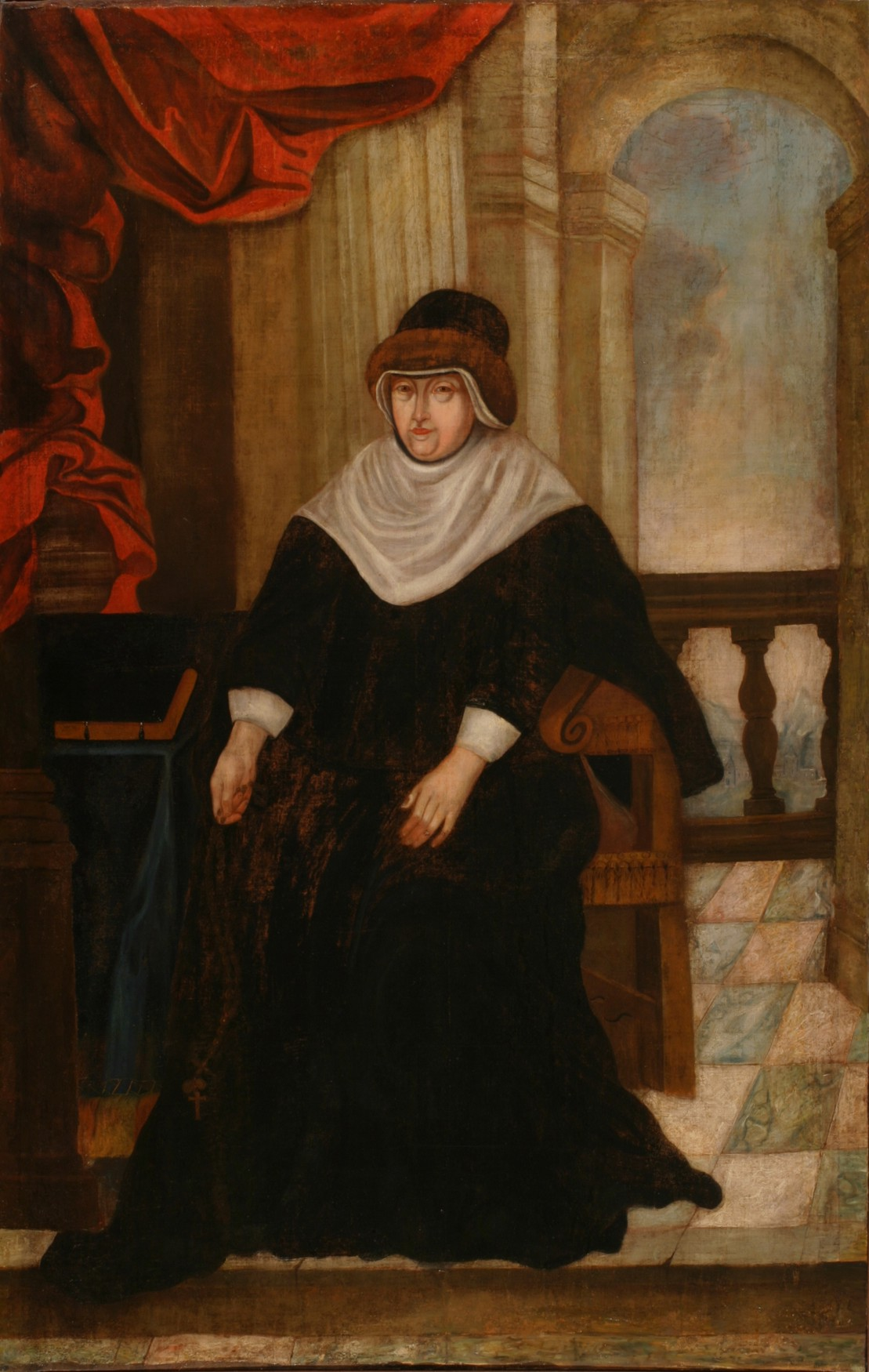
- Coat of arms: Janina
- Full name: Aleksandra Marianna z Sobieskich Wiesiołowska
- Died: 14 August 1645
- Family: Wiesiołowski
- Consort: Krzysztof Wiesiołowski
- Father: Marek Sobieski
- Mother: Jadwiga Snopkowska

Aleksandra Marianna Wiesiołowska (died on 14 August 1645) was the daughter of magnate Marek Sobieski and Jadwiga Snopkowska. She was married to Court Marshal of Lithuania Krzysztof Wiesiołowski and became later a Bridgettines as a widow.

== Life ==
Sobieska married the Lithuanian countryman and later Grand Marshal of Lithuania, Krzysztof Wiesiołowski. The marriage of Aleksandra and Krzysztof was childless, Aleksandra Wiesiołowska, together with her husband, sponsored the erection of the church of the Annunciation of the Blessed Virgin Mary and the monastery of the Sisters of the Most Holy Saviour in Grodno, the construction of which was completed in 1642. After her husband's death in 1637, Alexandra entered the monastery she founded, where she served as abbess. In the monastery founded by Aleksandra Wiesiołowska there was her portrait.

== Bibliography ==
- Borkowska M. OSB, Leksykon zakonnic polskich epoki przedrozbiorowej. Tom III. Polska Centralna i Południowa, Wydawnictwo DiG, Warszawa 2008, ISBN 83-7181-398-8, s. 30.
- Kamieniecka E., Z zagadnień sztuki Grodna połowy XVII wieku, (w:) Lorentz S., Michałowski K., Rocznik Muzeum Narodowego w Warszawie, t. XVI, Warszawa 1972, ss. 87–134.
- Podhorodecki L., Sobiescy herbu Janina, Ludowa Spółdzielnia Wydawnicza, Warszawa 1981, ISBN 83-205-3234-5, s. 9.
