= Marianna Wiśniowiecka =

Polish noblewoman (1600–1624)

- Princess
- Coat of arms: Korybut
- Born: 1600
- Died: February 1624 (aged 23–24)
- Family: Wiśniowiecki
- Consort: Jakub Sobieski
- Issue: 1. Teresa (b. 1622 d. 1623); 2. unknown daughter
- Father: Konstanty Wiśniowiecki
- Mother: Anna Zahorowska

Marianna Wiśniowiecka (1600 – February 1624) was Polish noblewoman (szlachcianka), the oldest daughter of Prince Konstanty Wiśniowiecki and Anna Zahorowska of Ostoja Clan.

In February 1620, she married the Polish magnate Jakub Sobieski, the father of Polish king Jan III Sobieski. She probably died in childbirth.

== Children ==
Marianna and Jakub had two daughters:

- Teresa (b. 1622 d. 1623)
- unknown daughter (b. and d. February 1624)

== Bibliography ==
- Lepecki M., Pan Jakobus Sobieski, Spółdzielnia Wydawnicza Czytelnik, Warszawa 1970, ISBN 83-07-00982-0, s. 93–103, 158.
- Podhorodecki L., Sobiescy herbu Janina, Ludowa Spółdzielnia Wydawnicza, Warszawa 1981, ISBN 83-205-3234-5, s. 30, 41.
- Czamańska I., Wiśniowieccy. Monografia rodu, Wydawnictwo Poznańskie, Poznań 2007, ISBN 978-83-7177-229-0, s. 156–157.
