= Stanisław Żółkiewski =

Polish noble (1547–1620)

- Hetman
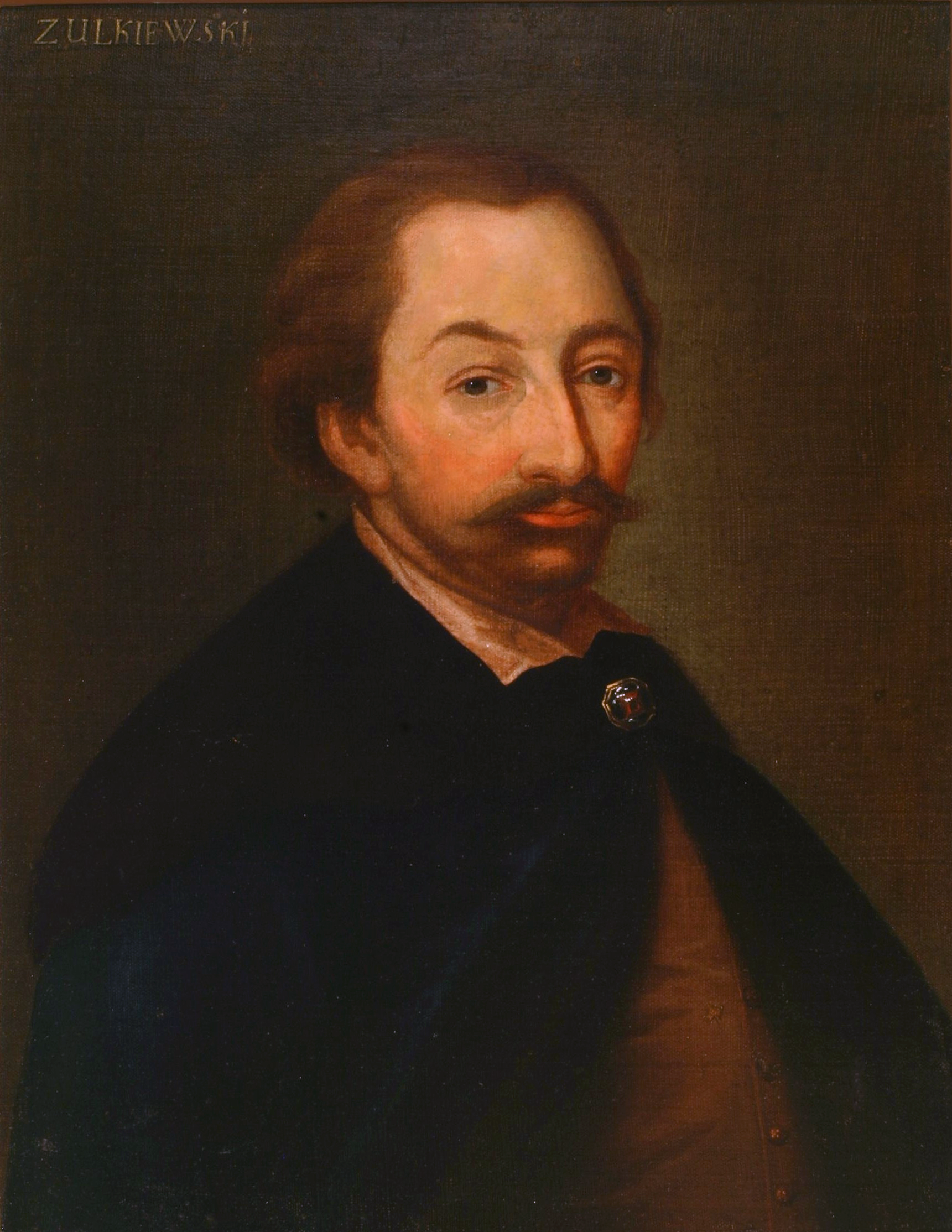

- Coat of arms
- Full name: Stanisław Żółkiewski herbu Lubicz
- Born: 1547; Turynka, Ruthenian Voivodeship, Kingdom of Poland
- Died: 7 October 1620 (aged 72–73); Battle of Cecora near Iaşi, Ottoman Empire
- Family: Żółkiewski
- Consort: Regina Herburt h. Herburt
- Issue: Jan Żółkiewski; Katarzyna Żółkiewska; Zofia Żółkiewska
- Father: Stanisław Żółkiewski
- Mother: Zofia Lipska h. Korczak

Stanisław Żółkiewski (Polish pronunciation: [staˈɲiswav ʐuwˈkʲɛfskʲi]; 1547 – 7 October 1620) was a Polish nobleman of the Lubicz coat of arms, a magnate, military commander, and Chancellor of the Polish Crown in the Polish–Lithuanian Commonwealth who took part in many military campaigns in the Commonwealth and on its southern and eastern borders.

He held high posts in the administration of the Commonwealth, including those of Castellan of Lwów (from 1590), Governor of Kiev Province, and Great Chancellor of the Crown (from 1618).

From 1588 he was also a Field Crown Hetman, and in 1618 was promoted to Grand Hetman of the Crown. He won major battles against Sweden, Russia, the Ottoman Empire, and the Tatars.

Żółkiewski's best-known victory was against combined Russian and Swedish forces at the 1610 Battle of Klushino, in whose wake the Poles seized and occupied Moscow.

He died in the 1620 Battle of Cecora against the Ottomans, after allegedly refusing to retreat. The fame of the already renowned Żółkiewski was further boosted by his heroic death. He was one of the most accomplished military commanders of the Polish–Lithuanian Commonwealth.

== Life ==
=== Youth ===
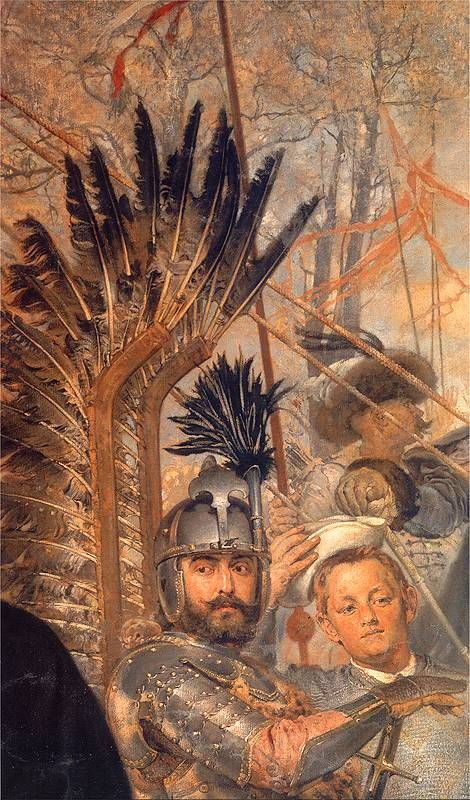
Stanisław Żółkiewski and Baltazar Batory at Pskov, detail from a painting by Jan Matejko

Stanisław Żółkiewski was born in the village of Turynka (then Kingdom of Poland, now western Ukraine) in 1547 to Stanisław Żółkiewski of the Lubicz coat of arms, voivode of Ruthenia, and Zofia Lipska. The exact date of his birth is unknown, and even the year is disputed: most sources agree on 1547, although a few suggest 1550.

Żółkiewski attended a cathedral school in Lwów (now Lviv, Ukraine). Unlike many of his peers, he had no higher education and did not travel abroad. However, he pursued studies on his own and was particularly interested in history and historical literature. In 1566 he joined the court of King Sigismund II Augustus, as an aid to the king's secretary Jan Zamoyski. There he became familiar with the executionist movement, which advocated numerous reforms including military ones. In 1573, he took part in the diplomatic mission to France, sent to meet the newly elected king Henry III of France, and on his way back, he was sent to Vienna to appease the Habsburgs.

=== Early career ===
Żółkiewski gained his first military experience under King Stefan Batory during the Danzig rebellion in which he commanded a rota of Polish hussars. He subsequently participated in Batory's Livonian campaign, fighting at Polotsk, Rossony (Sokół), Velizh and at the Siege of Pskov. Żółkiewski maintained his political alliance with the Zamoyski family after those campaigns ended, particularly in their conflict with the Zborowscy. On the night of 11 to 12 May 1584, he captured Samuel Zborowski, whose subsequent execution caused much controversy. Żółkiewski became notorious for his role in the incident, and was the subject of heated debates during the Sejm of 1585.

In 1588, during the War of the Polish Succession between factions of Sigismund III Vasa and Maximilian III, Żółkiewski supported Sigismund. Żółkiewski commanded the right flank of Commonwealth forces in the battle of Byczyna, during which he received a knee wound that lamed him for the remainder of his life. For his part in the battle he was appointed a Field Crown Hetman, and became the starosta of Hrubieszów.

=== Field Crown Hetman ===
Soon after becoming a Hetman, Żółkiewski was sent to Ukraine to repel a Tatar invasion. In 1590 he became the castellan of Lwów, but his requests for military reinforcements against the Tatars went unheeded.

In 1595 Żółkiewski participated in the Moldavian campaign and the battle of Cecora near the Prut river. The following year he defeated the Cossack uprising of Severyn Nalivaiko. Żółkiewski was a known supporter of Cossack grievances, and generally favored peaceful negotiations with them. When the Cossacks surrendered Nalivaiko and other leaders of the uprising to him, he guaranteed their fair treatment. But Nalivaiko was subsequently executed in Warsaw, and a mob of Polish soldiers massacred the other prisoners, which led to a deterioration in Polish-Cossack relations. In 1600 Żółkiewski returned to Moldova, where he took part in the victorious battle of Bukowo.

In 1601 Żółkiewski operated in the north, in Livonia (Inflanty), during the Polish–Swedish War. He also took part in the successful siege of Wolmar, and in 1602 the taking of Fellin. That same year he led Polish forces at the battle of Reval, which led to a Swedish capitulation at the siege of Biały Kamień. Żólkiewski became ill near the end of the campaign and had to relinquish command of his forces to Hetman Jan Karol Chodkiewicz.

In 1606 Żółkiewski returned to Ukraine, where he defeated the Tatars at the battle of Udycz. Later that year he decided to support the king during the Zebrzydowski rebellion. His decision was not an obvious one, as his mentor Zamoyski opposed the king. Additionally, Żółkiewski was related to the Zebrzydowski family and was sympathetic to some of the rebels' arguments. In the battle of Guzów he commanded the left flank of the royal forces, but his troops took relatively little part in the battle. Unimpressed with Żółkiewski's performance, the king did not give him the Grand Crown Hetmanship that he coveted, although he was appointed to the office of the voivode of Kiev.

In the second half of 1609, Żółkiewski took part in the Polish–Russian War (also known as the Dymitriads). He supported the election of Władysław IV Vasa for the title of tsar of Russia and the idea of a personal union between the Commonwealth and the Tsardom of Russia (the Polish–Lithuanian–Muscovite Commonwealth). During the De la Gardie Campaign in 1610 he achieved another significant victory against combined Russian and Swedish forces at the battle of Klushino. As a result of his successful campaign Żółkiewski seized Moscow and captured the tsar Vasiliy Shuisky and his brothers, Ivan Shuisky and Dmitry Shuisky. Sigismund rejected Żółkiewski's political plan, however, which would have required Władysław to convert to Orthodoxy.

Żółkiewski began to write his memoirs after his return from Russia. The Początek i progres wojny moskiewskiej (The beginning and Progress of the Muscovite War), published in 1612, is a critique of Sigismund's policies. In 1612, he became a teacher and tutor of Stanisław Koniecpolski, the future hetman and military commander. Also that year, he returned to Ukraine to defend against continuing Tatar and Moldovan incursions, as well as Cossack unrest. In 1616, during a Sejm, he presented a project O chowaniu żołnierza kwarcianego (On the raising of the kwarciane soldiers), in which he argued for the need to raise a larger army to deal with the Tatars and the Cossacks. The project was, however, not approved by the parliament.

=== Final years ===
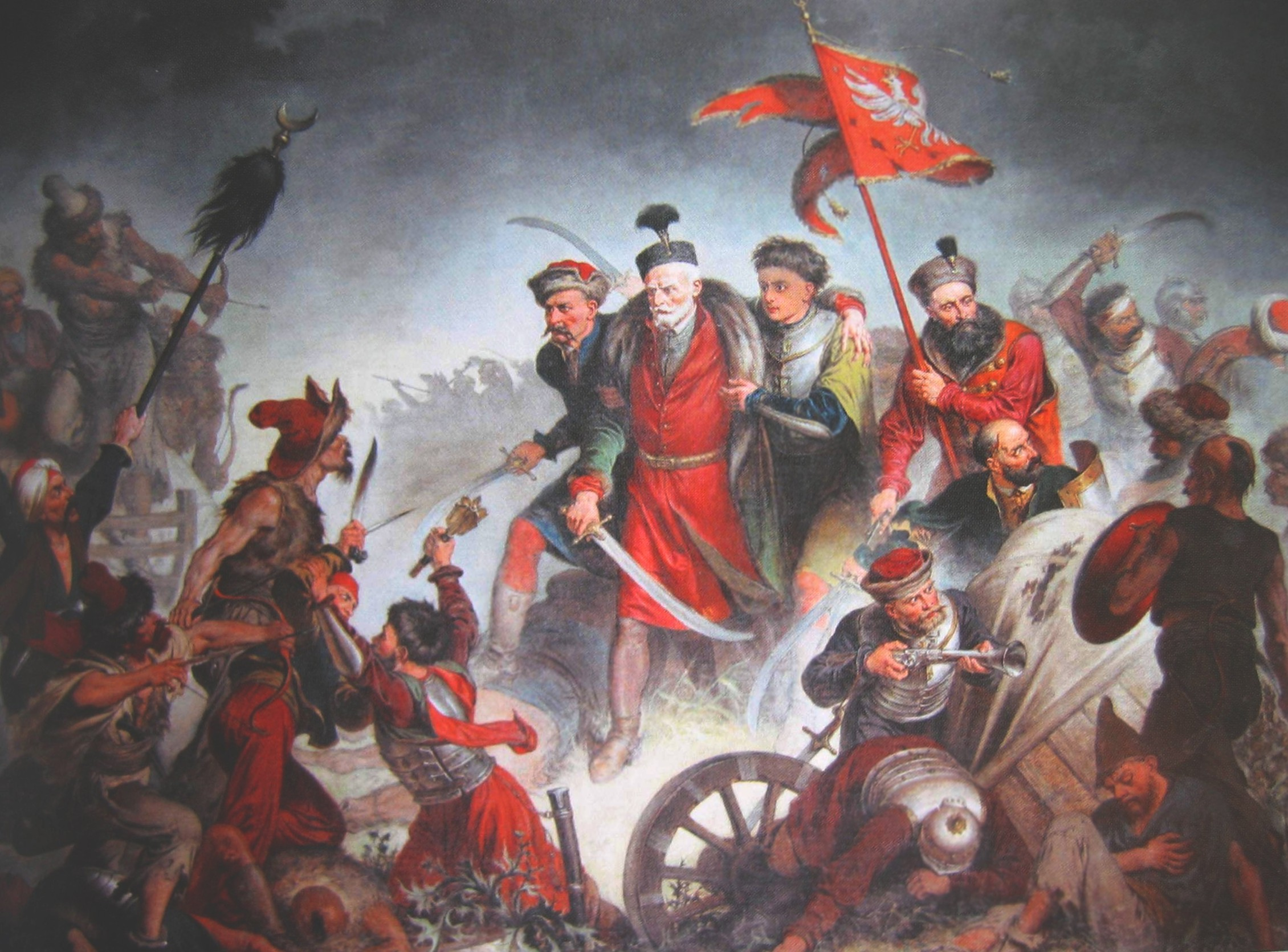
Death of Stanisław Żółkiewski with his confessor, Father Szymon Wybierski, Battle of Cecora (1620), painting by Walery Eljasz Radzikowski

Żółkiewski's popularity waned in the latter years of his career. He was accused of not supporting Samuel Korecki during the battle of Sasowy Róg in 1616, of signing the Treaty of Jaruga (Busza) in 1617 which relinquished influence in some borderlands to Moldova and the Ottoman Empire; and of failing to stop the Tatars at the battle of Orynin in 1618. But in 1618 he finally received his coveted buława of the Grand Crown Hetman, and shortly afterwards the office of Grand Crown Chancellor. He was thus for a brief period the most powerful individual in the Commonwealth after the king, a position he reached not through wealth or family but by military achievement and reputation.

Despite being more than 70 years old, Żółkiewski continued in active service as a military commander until the very end. He died on 7 October 1620, during the Commonwealth's retreat after the battle of Cecora against the Turks, during the Polish–Ottoman War (1620–1621) which marked the end of the Moldavian campaigns. The battle comprised several engagements, in which Polish forces were routed. During the last rout Żólkiewski was killed; according to an anecdote, he refused to retreat, preferring to stay with the rear guard till the very end. Before his death he received the blessing of his confessor, Father Szymon Wybierski (Wybierek) of the Society of Jesus, who stood fearlessly at his side (7 October). {see painting "Battle of Cecora (1620)" by Walery Eljasz Radzikowski}

After the battle, Żółkiewski's corpse was desecrated by the removal of its head and sent to Constantinople as a trophy of war. His widow bought his body from the Turks and ransomed their son, who had been captured during the battle. Żółkiewski was buried in St Lawrence Church in Żółkiew (now Zhovkva, Ukraine), the town he enlarged and where he built the Żółkiew Castle.

== Remembrance ==
Żółkiewski's heroic death – portrayed in several works of art by contemporaries such as Teofil Szemberg and Stanisław Witkowski – boosted his reputation and guaranteed him a place among the pantheon of the most famous of Polish military commanders. In the years following his death he was mentioned in the works of writers such as Stefan Żeromski, Józef Szujski, Julian Ursyn Niemcewicz and Maria Konopnicka. Up to the present day, the story of his death is the best remembered aspect of his life, with a number of sources discussing the "legend of Żółkiewski".

A monument was built at the site of Żółkiewski's death (now in Berezovca in Ocnița District, Moldova) by his son Jan, in 1621. It is inscribed with a motto from Horace: "Quam dulce et decorum est pro patria mori" (How sweet and fitting it is to die for one's country). The monument was destroyed in 1868, rebuilt in 1912, and renovated in 2003. It is a venue for events organized by the Polish minority in Moldova.

In 1903 a statue of Żółkiewski was built in Źółkiew, but it was demolished in 1939 by Soviet troops in the aftermath of the Soviet invasion of Poland. In modern Poland Źółkiewski is celebrated as a military hero, but modern Russia's Unity Day instead celebrates the anniversary of the surrender of the Polish forces he installed in the Moscow garrison. As of 2011, the St. Lawrence's Church and castle in Źółkwia were being renovated by a team of Polish and Ukrainian conservators.

== Family and assets ==
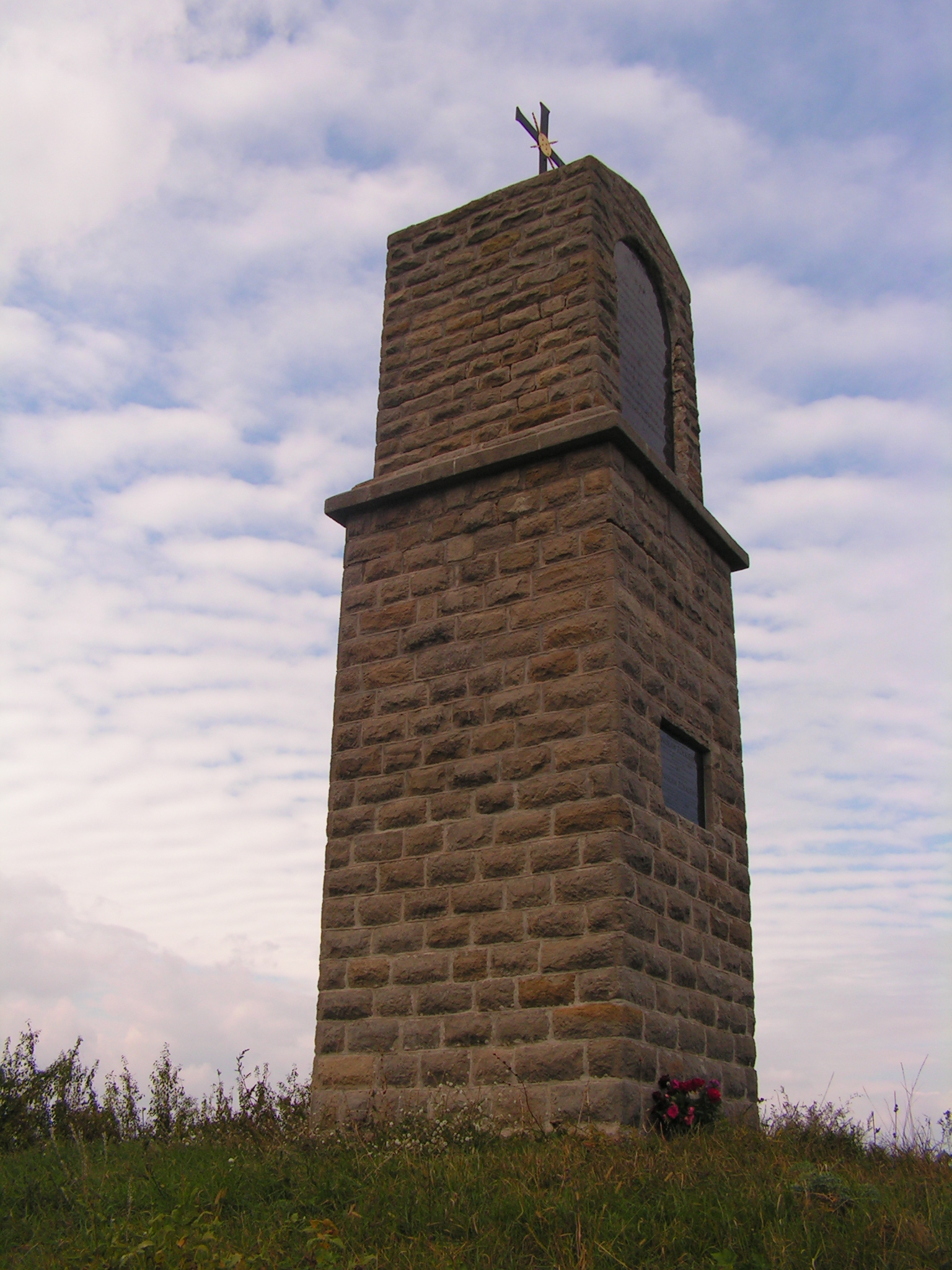
Monument to Żókiewski, near the site of his death in modern Moldova

Żółkiewski was married to Regina Herbutówna; they had a son, Jan, and two daughters, Katarzyna and Zofia. Over the course of his career Żółkiewski amassed a large fortune, and acquired lands near Boryspil, Brody, Vinnytsia and Żółkiew. His annual income of more than 100,000 zlotys made him one of the wealthiest magnates in the Commonwealth. Żółkiewski's assets were eventually inherited by Jakub Sobieski, whose son Jan became a Polish king and another renowned Polish commander.

== Works ==
- Początek i progres wojny moskiewskiej (On the Beginning and the End of the Muscovite War, also known as The Beginning and Progress of the Muscovy War) – Żółkiewski's memoirs describing his campaigns and diplomatic activity, written in the third person, and presenting a concise account of the Polish–Muscovite War (1605–1618).

== See also ==
- Army of the Polish–Lithuanian Commonwealth
- List of Poles
- "Stanislaus Zolkiewski" . Catholic Encyclopedia. 1913.
- Bain, Robert Nisbet (1911). "Zolkiewski, Stanislaus" . Encyclopædia Britannica. Vol. 28 (11th ed.). pp. 1001–1002.
