= Aaron of Trebowla =

Ukrainian Jewish writer

- Born: Aaron ben Nathan Nata' of Trebowla c. 1700s
- Died: c. late 1700s to early 1800s
- Writing career
- Language: Ukrainian, Hebrew
- Period: 1755–1768
- Notable work: Maḳlo shel Aharon (Aaron's Staff)

Aaron ben Nathan Nata' of Trebowla was a Ukrainian Jewish writer who flourished about the middle of the eighteenth century.

== Career ==
Aaron ben Nathan Nata' of Trebowla published at Zolkiev, in 1755, "Shem Aharon" (Aaron's Name), a work containing halakic novellæ to the whole Talmud, and midrashic interpretations of the Pentateuch under the sub-title, "Netibot la-Shebet." He also published a commentary on Talmudic discussions on the Pentateuch, which bears the title "Maḳlo shel Aharon" (Aaron's Staff) and was published in 1768.
