= Aaron Margalita =

Aaron Margalita or Margalitha (c.1663–c.1725) was a Polish Jewish Rabbi who later converted to Christianity.

== Life ==
Aaron Margalita was born at Zolkiev in 1663 or 1665. Becoming a rabbi, he travelled as a maggid in Poland and Germany, preaching in the local synagogues, and taught rabbinics for seven years at the University of Leiden. His friend Jacobus Trigland converted him to Calvinism, as Margalita explained in his Oblatio Aaronis seu Tractatus de Passionibus Christi (Frankfort-on-the-Oder, 1706). Travelling to Berlin, he denounced the Haggadah as containing blasphemies against Christianity, causing Frederick I of Prussia to suspend temporarily the sales of a recently published edition of the Midrash Rabbah, until a theological investigation had officially pronounced it harmless. With Frederick's patronage, Margalita became Professor of rabbinic Hebrew at the University of Frankfurt. He is said to have become a Lutheran at Hamburg around 1712, but to have later been imprisoned in Copenhagen for wanting to return to Judaism. He "died in prison, hated by his own nation for his apostasy, and deserted by those whose doctrines he had embraced". He died around 1725.
