= Marek Sobieski =

Polish-Lithuanian noble

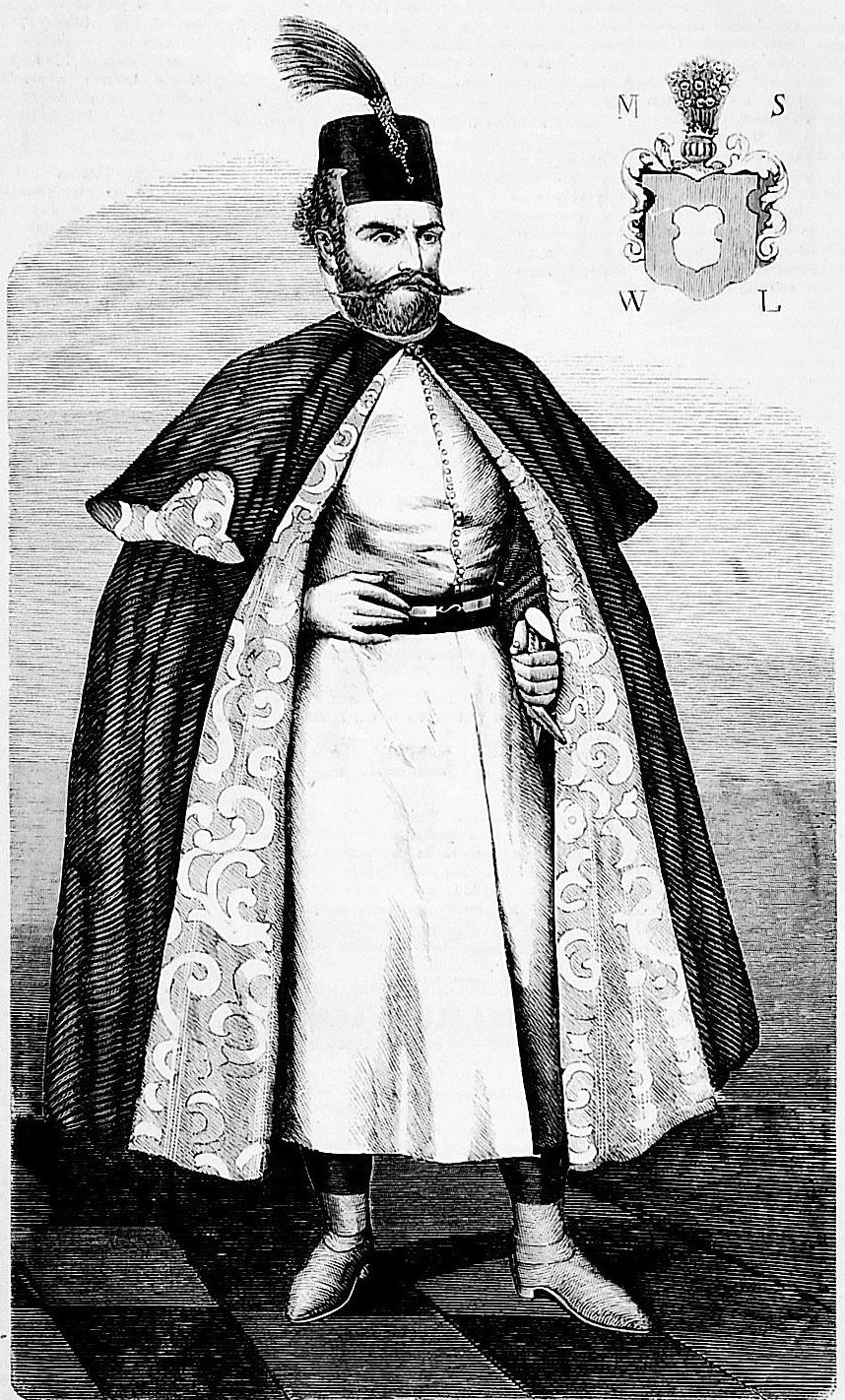
- Coat of arms: Janina
- Full name: Marek Sobieski herbu Janina
- Born: 1549/1550
- Died: 1605
- Family: Sobieski
- Consort: Jadwiga Snopkowska; Katarzyna Tęczyńska
- Issue: with Jadwiga Snopkowska; Jakub Sobieski; Zofia Sobieska; Aleksandra Marianna Sobieska; Katarzyna Sobieska; Gryzelda Sobieska; Anna Sobieska; Jan Sobieski; Helena Sobieska
- Father: Jan Sobieski
- Mother: Katarzyna Gdeszyńska h. Gozdawa

Marek Sobieski (1549/1550 – 1605) was a Polish–Lithuanian noble (szlachcic).

He was a courtier from 1577, a Royal Court Chorąży (chorąży nadworny królewski) from 1581, a castellan of Lublin from 1597, and a voivode of Lublin Voivodeship from c. 1597/98.

He was the grandfather of Jan III Sobieski, the elected King of the Polish–Lithuanian Commonwealth.
