= Zhovkva Castle =

17th-century castle in the town of Zhovka, Ukraine

Coordinates: 50.0544°N 23.9689°E

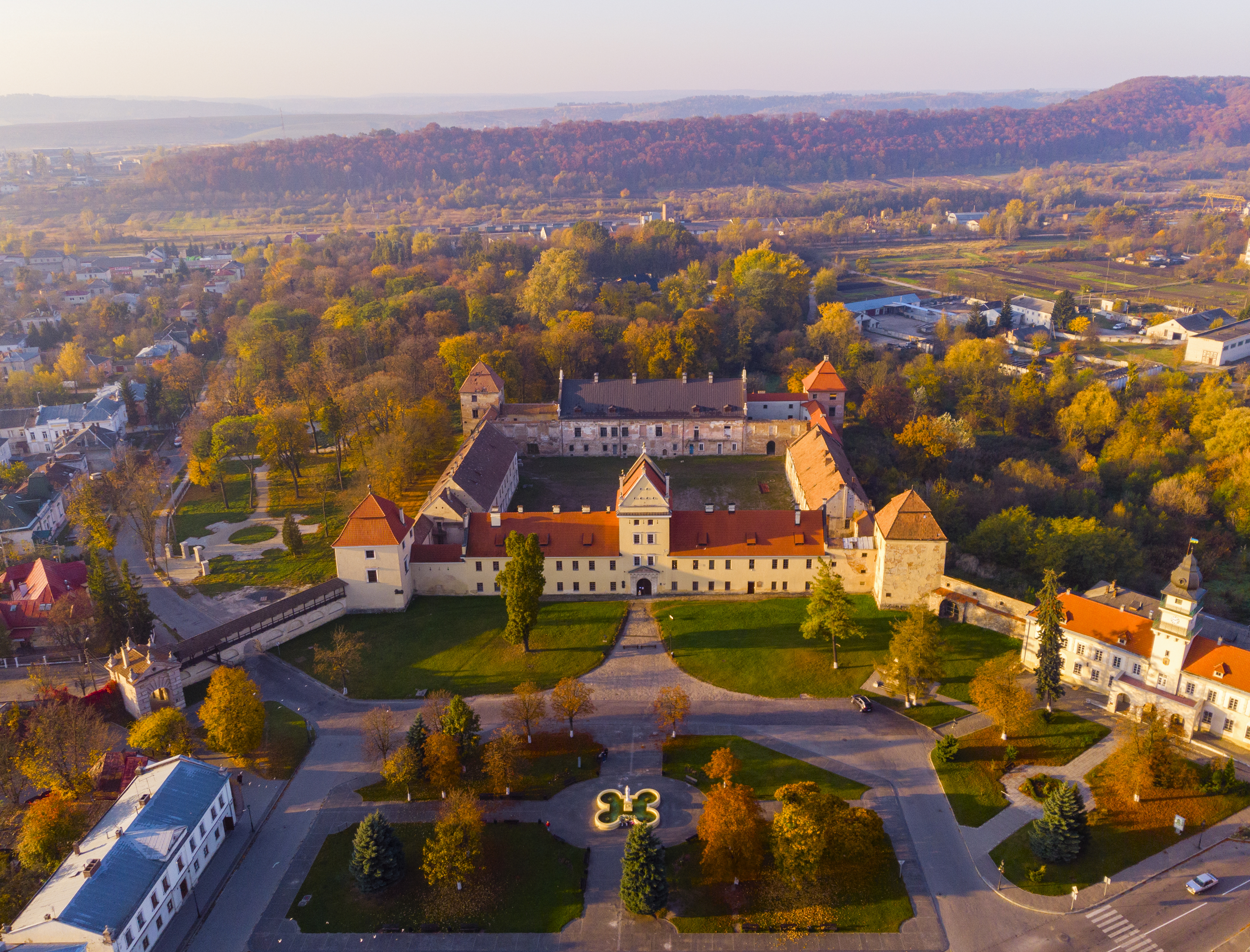
Zhovkva Castle, the Sobieski residence in Żółkiew (Zhovkva)

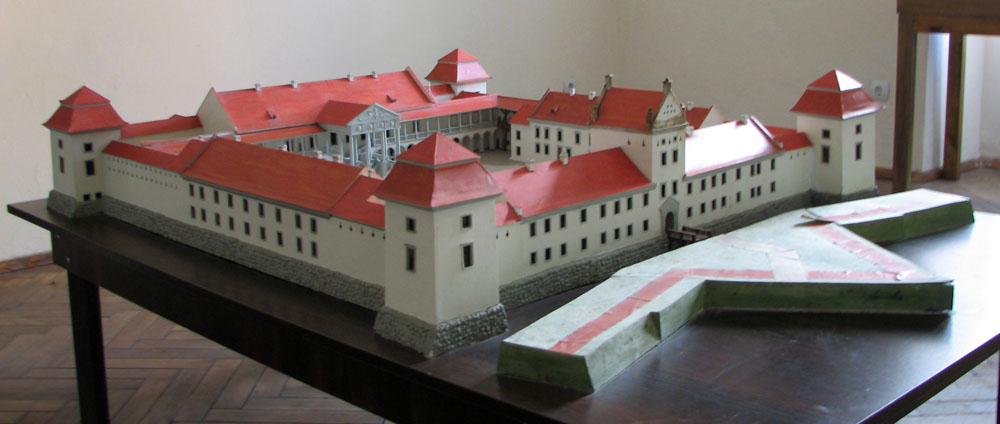
Miniature model of the castle's presumed original appearance

The Zhovkva Castle (Ukrainian: Жовківський замок; Polish: Zamek w Żółkwi) occupies the principal square of the town of Zhovkva in Ukraine. It was founded by Polish Hetman Stanisław Żółkiewski as his fortified residence. Construction began in 1594 and was mostly completed in 1606.

The castle had a typically Serlian entrance arch and was encircled by moats (up to 17 meters in width). One wing of the building accommodated the arsenal and stables; another was immediately contiguous to the city wall. In 1606, a garden was laid out next to the hetman's residence. It contained a menagerie with wisents, deer, and chamois. The palatine chapel was consecrated in 1640.

The golden age of the Zolkiew Castle was the late 17th century when it passed through inheritance to Jakub Sobieski and then to his son King Jan III Sobieski, a native of Zhovkva. It was there that the king celebrated his victory at Vienna. In the 18th century the castle's facade was decorated with the statues of its owners from the Zolkiewski, Daniłowicz, Sobieski, and Radziwill families.

After the partition of Poland the castle fell into disuse and was auctioned off. During the 19th century the chapel and some other structures were dismantled or rebuilt to accommodate a local school. The castle sustained further damage during the First World War. Some restoration was undertaken just before the Second World War, but much more was required following the end of hostilities.

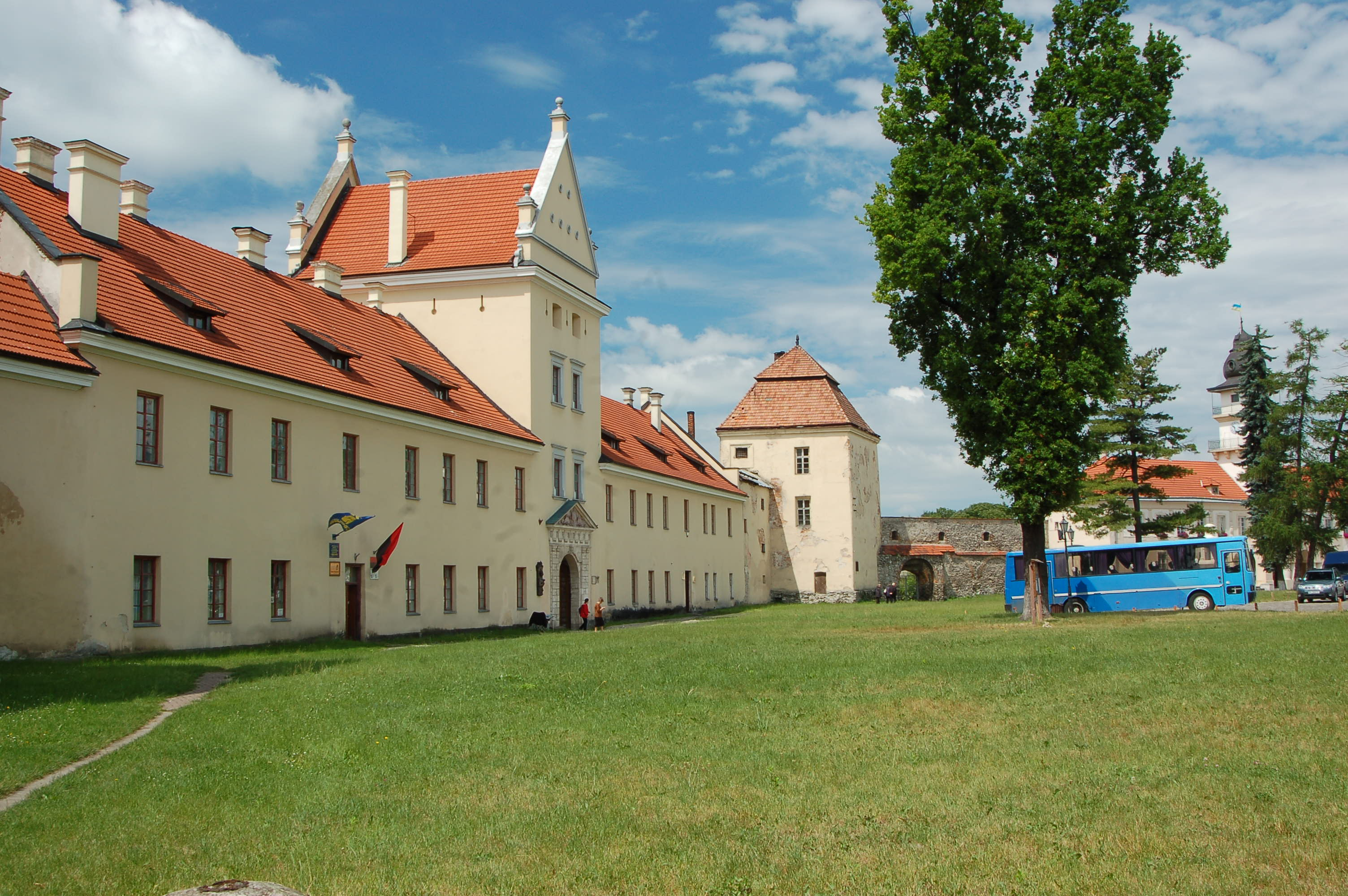

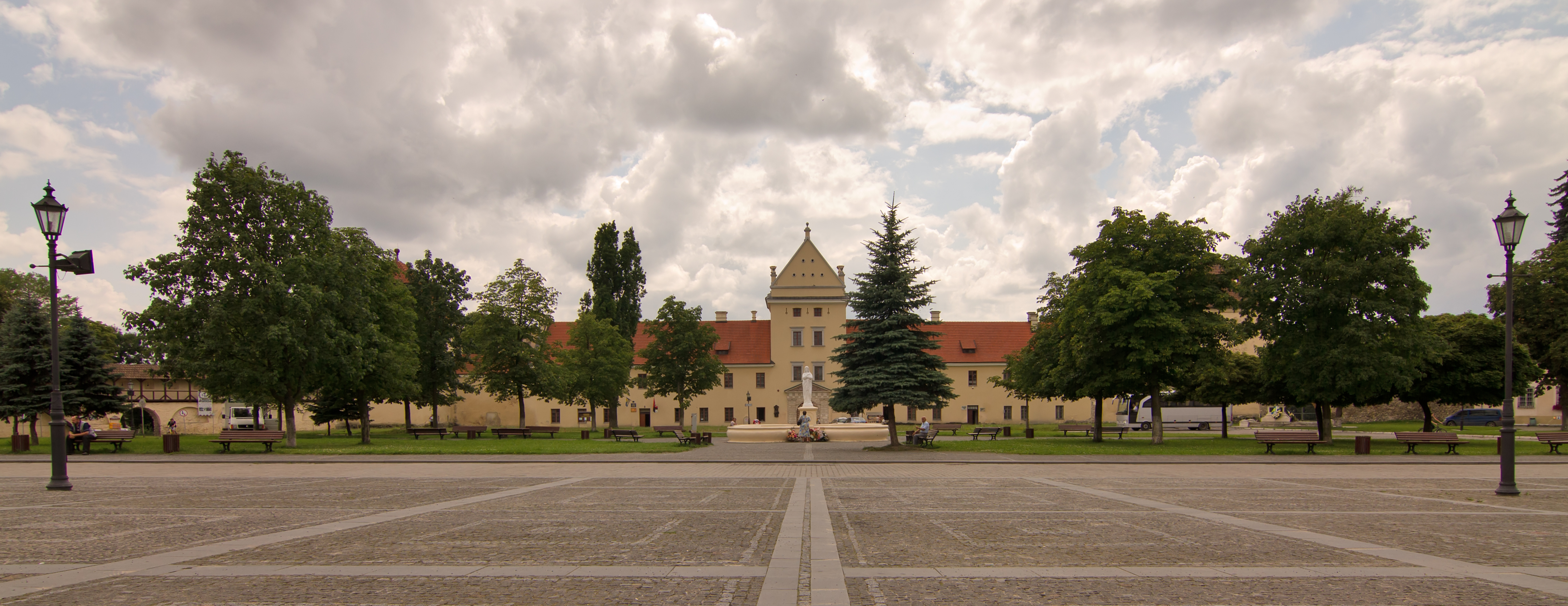

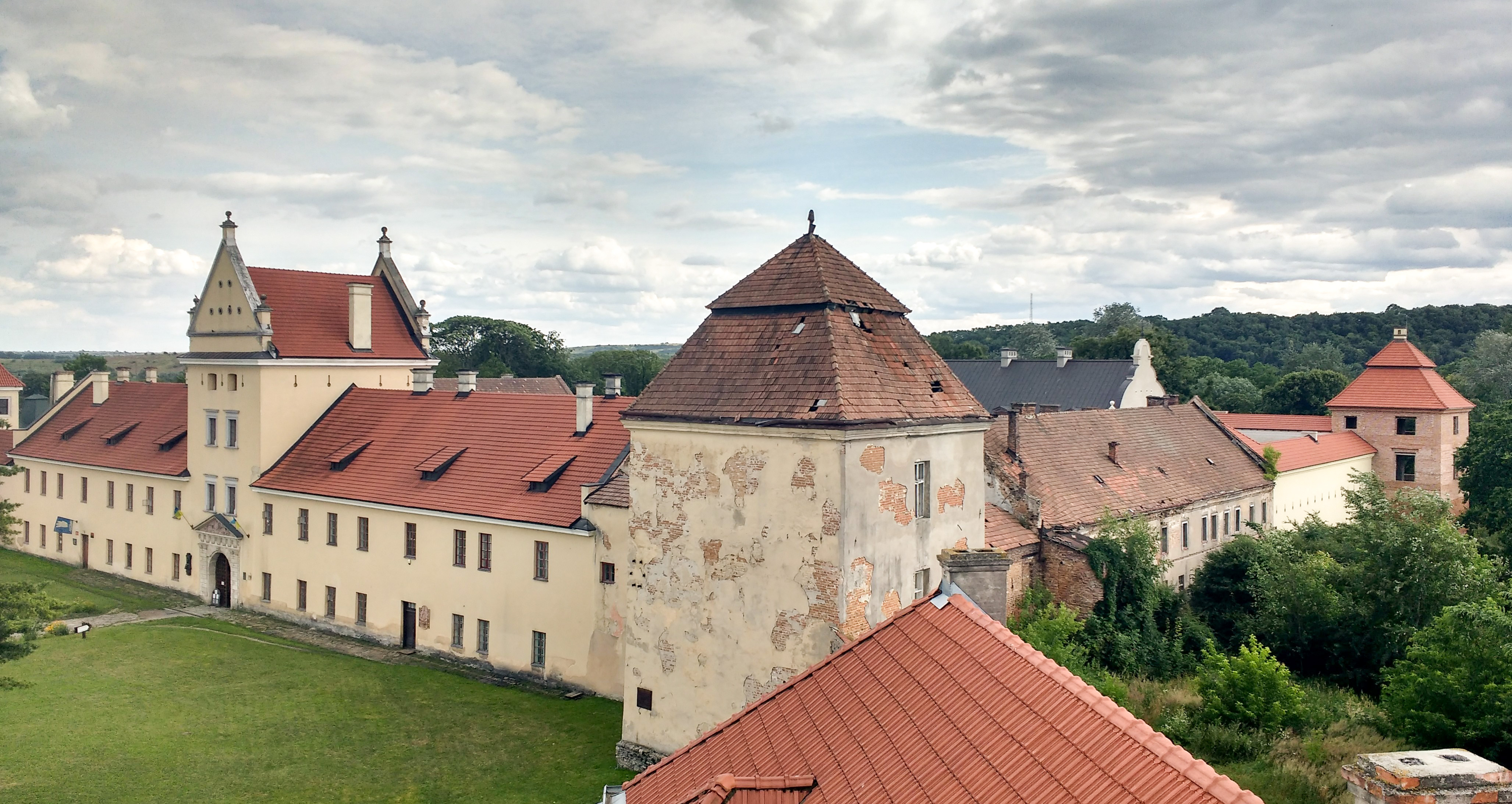
