= Ariah Judah Leib Sirkin =

Polish rabbi and scholar

Ariah Judah Leib ben Samuel Gershon Sirkin (Hebrew: אריה יהודה ליב בן שמואל גרשון הלוי; c. 1652 – before 1745) was a late 17th-century Polish rabbi and scholar. Born around 1652 he was a paternal descendant of Joel Sirkis. In Zhovkva, Ukraine, he printed his main work "Leviat Chen" in 1732. The work was widely received and earned the approbation of the greatest scholars of his time.
