= Zhovkva =

City in Lviv Oblast, Ukraine

Zhovkva Жовква
- City
- Main market square with the Collegiate Church of St. Lawrence

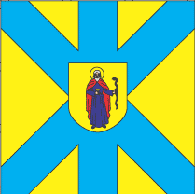
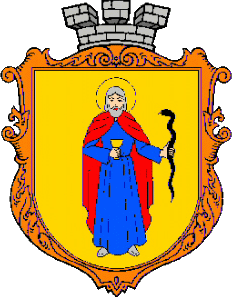
- Flag Coat of arms
- Interactive map of Zhovkva
- Zhovkva location on a map Zhovkva (Ukraine)
- Coordinates: 50°3′18″N 23°58′36″E
- Country: Ukraine
- Oblast: Lviv Oblast
- Raion: Lviv Raion
- Hromada: Zhovkva urban hromada
- Founded: 1597
- Town rights: 1603
- Founder: Stanisław Żółkiewski
- Named for: Stanisław Żółkiewski

Area
  - Total: 7.64 km^{2} (2.95 sq mi)

Population (2022)
  - Total: 13,852
  - Density: 1,810/km^{2} (4,700/sq mi)
- Postal code: 80300—80304
- Area code: +380 3252
- Sister cities: Kraśnik, Poland

Zhovkva (Note: Ukrainian: Жовква, IPA: [ˈʒɔu̯kwɐ]; Polish: Żółkiew; Yiddish: זאָלקוואַ, romanized: Zolkva; 1951–1992: Nesterov (Ukrainian: Нестеров)) is a city in Lviv Raion, Lviv Oblast (region) of western Ukraine. Zhovkva hosts the administration of Zhovkva urban hromada, one of the hromadas of Ukraine. Its population is approximately 13,852 (2022 estimate).

Founded in the 16th century, Zhovkva features a preserved old town built on an ideal Renaissance plan with several landmarks, including a former noble and royal castle and several temples. Fostered by its location at the intersection of important trade routes and the patronage of prominent noble families and the royal family, the town was a major center of culture, politics, commerce and manufacturing in the region in the early modern period.

== History ==
=== Foundation and early modern era ===
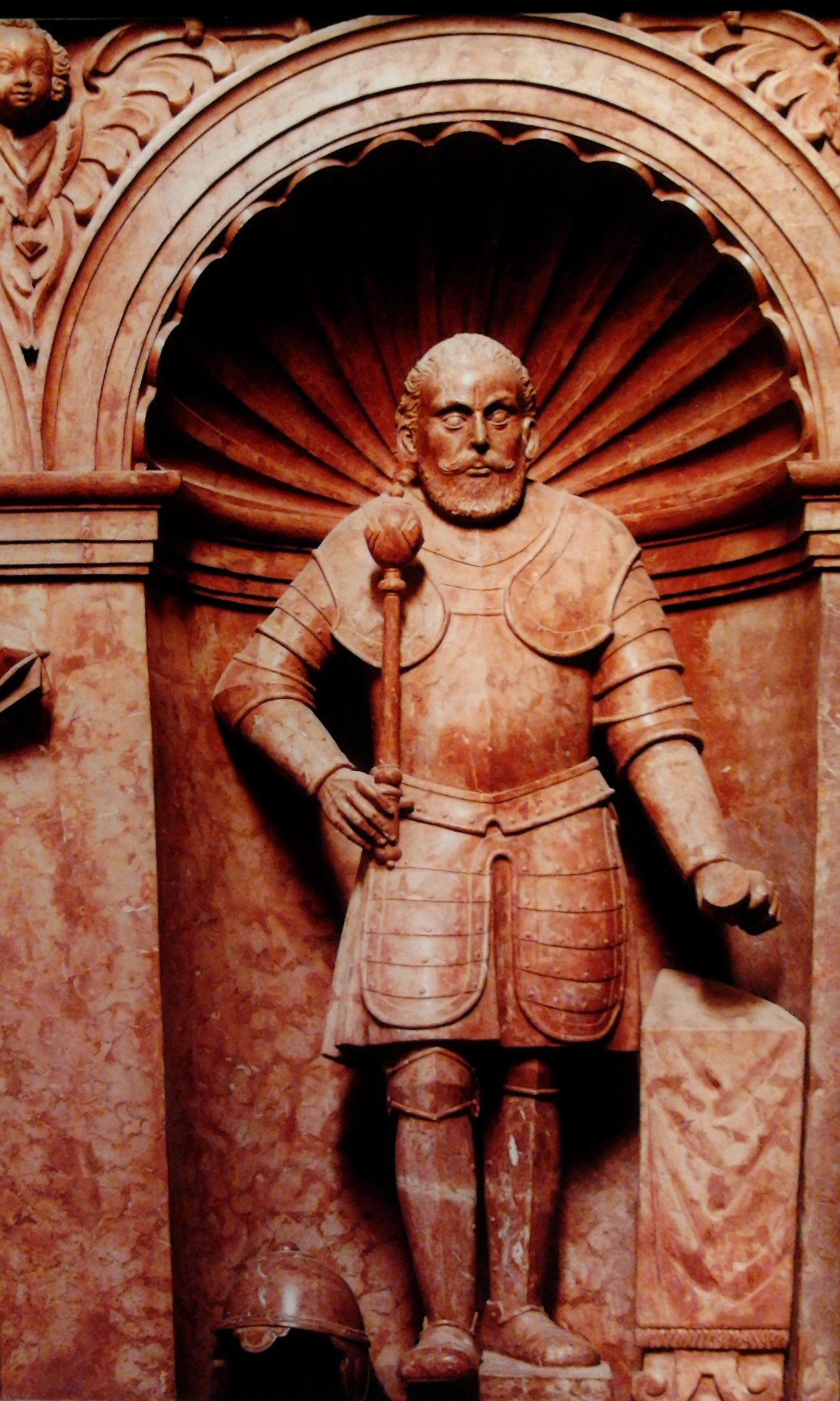
Statue of the town's founder Stanisław Żółkiewski in the Collegiate Church of St. Lawrence

A village named Vynnyky was mentioned at the site in 1368 and was part of the Kingdom of Poland under the Piast dynasty. The town was founded in 1597 as a private fortified town and named Żółkiew after its founder, one of the most accomplished military commanders in Polish history, hetman Stanisław Żółkiewski. Like Zamość, which was founded by Żółkiewski's mentor Jan Zamoyski, Żółkiew was built on an ideal Renaissance city plan. Due to its strategic location at the intersection of important trade routes, the town prospered. In 1603 it was granted town rights by King Sigismund III Vasa. From its earliest days, the population was a mix of Poles, Armenians, Ukrainians, and Jews. Great Jewish scholars from Zhovkva include Ariah Judah Leib Sirkin and Betzalel HaLevi of Zhovkva. In 1693 a Jewish printing press was established in the city by Uri ben Aharon haLevi Witmund from Amsterdam. Jewish publishers remained active in Zhovkva until the early 20th century.

In the 17th century, it became the royal residence for King John III Sobieski of Poland, and a hub of religious life, arts and commerce. In 1676, King of France, Louis XIV, visited Żółkiew and awarded the Polish King with the Order of the Holy Spirit. The city was the site of celebrations after the victorious Battle of Vienna of 1683, and in 1684 the Polish King was awarded there with papal gifts, sent by Pope Innocent XI.

As a private town of Poland, Żółkiew was the property of the Żółkiewski, Daniłowicz, Sobieski and Radziwiłł families. During this period, most of the city's landmarks were built, including the Zhovkva Castle and St. Lawrence's Church, both founded by Stanisław Żółkiewski, the Dominican church, founded by Teofila Sobieska, the fortress-like Great Synagogue, co-financed by King John III Sobieski, and the foundations of the king's sons: the Saint Lazarus church founded by prince James Louis Sobieski and the Holy Trinity Church, founded by prince Konstanty Władysław Sobieski. In 1747, Michał Kazimierz "Rybeńko" Radziwiłł founded a faience factory in Żółkiew.

In 1711, Francis II Rákóczi, Hungarian national hero who found refuge in Poland after the fall of the Rákóczi's War of Independence against Austria, visited the town.

=== Late modern era ===
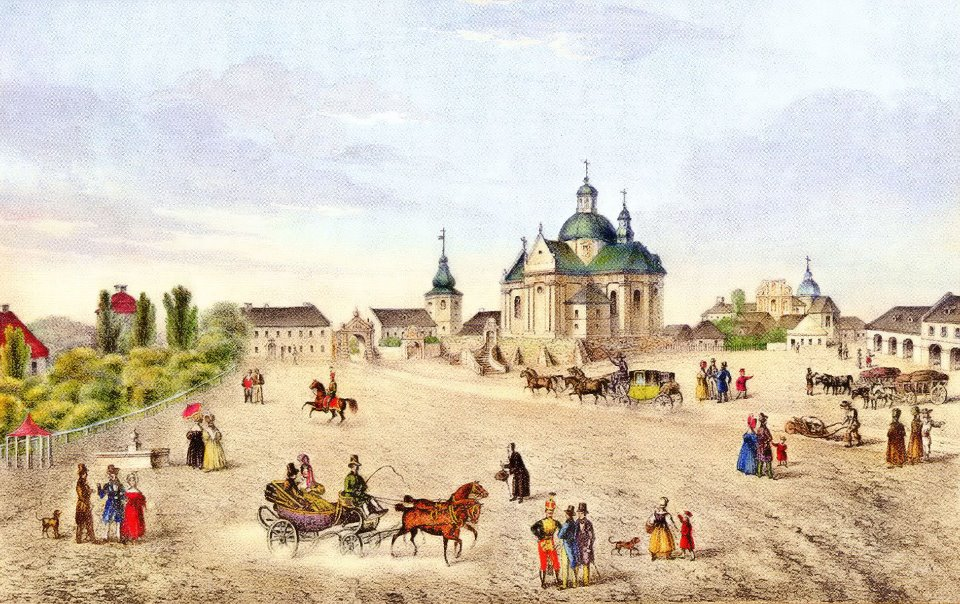
19th-century view of the market square with the St. Lawrence's Church, drawing by Karel Auer

From the First Partition of Poland in 1772 until 1918, the town (named Żółkiew) was part of the Austrian monarchy (the Austrian Empire from 1804; Austrian part of Austro-Hungary after the compromise of 1867) within the Galicia and Lodomeria crown land (province). It was the seat of one of Galicia's Kreise ('circles') until 1850, and again from 1854 to 1865, as well as one of the 63 short-lived Bezirkshauptmannschaften ('district captaincies'; normally shortened to Bezirk(e), 'district(s)'; Polish: powiat(y), Ukrainian: пові́т(и), romanized: povít(y)) from 1850 to 1853/54. In 1867 it once again became the seat of one of Galicia's (at the time) 74 new Bezirkshauptmannschaften, which lasted until the dissolution of Austria-Hungary in 1918.

The West Ukrainian People's Republic, established on November 1, 1918, included the whole Zhovkva povit (county). The town came under Polish control in May 1919, seven months after the re-establishment of independent Poland, confirmed by the Paris Peace Conference in June 1919 and the Peace of Riga in 1921. It was a county (powiat) seat located in the Lwów Voivodeship. In the interwar period the 6th Cavalry Regiment of the Polish Army, named after hetman Stanisław Żółkiewski, was stationed in the town.

=== World War II ===
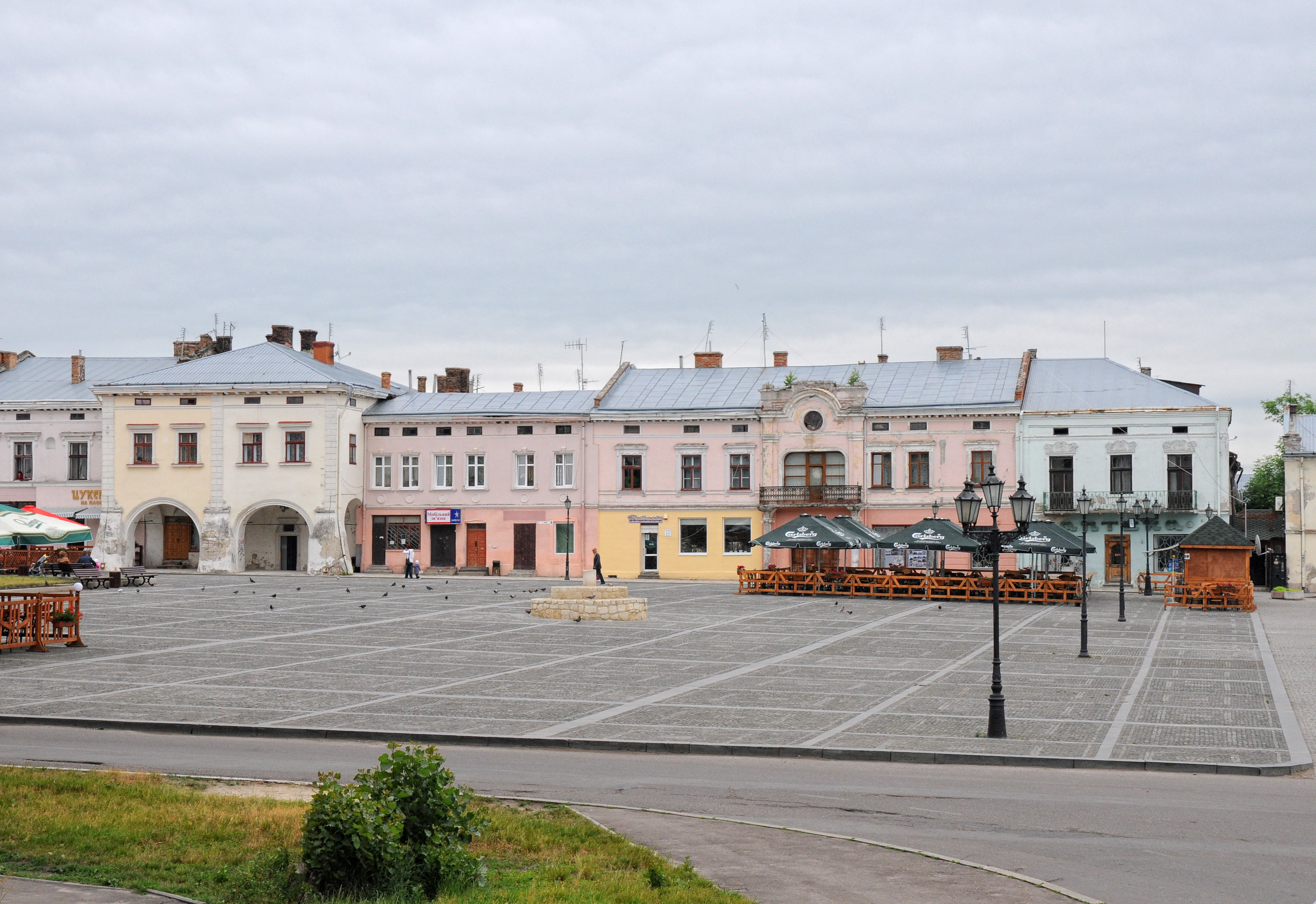
Market square in modern times

In 1939, following the Soviet invasion of Poland, Żółkiew, together with the rest of Poland's Kresy Wschodnie, was occupied by the Soviet Union. The Soviets destroyed the statue of King John III Sobieski, located in front of the town hall and the statue of the city founder hetman Stanisław Żółkiewski, located in the park. In June 1941, the Soviets executed 34 people, Ukrainians and Poles, in a prison organized in the former Żółkiewski castle, as part of the NKVD prisoner massacres. A few people managed to escape the massacre, including a German prisoner of war.

From 1941 to 1944, Zhovkva was occupied by Germany. At the beginning of the occupation, Jews numbered around 4500 and were almost half the town's population. Fewer than 100 of the city's Jews survived the Holocaust. In 1942, Germans, assisted by Ukrainian police, deported 3,200 Jews to the Belzec extermination camp. Many others were killed by Germans, assisted by Ukrainian police, in the vicinity of the city, and the rest were taken to the Janowska concentration camp. The synagogue was blown up by the Nazis in 1941, leaving only the outside walls. In 2000, the building was declared one of the world's most endangered sites by the World Monuments Fund. A restoration campaign began in 2001, supported by WMF's Jewish Heritage Program and other sources, which is ongoing.

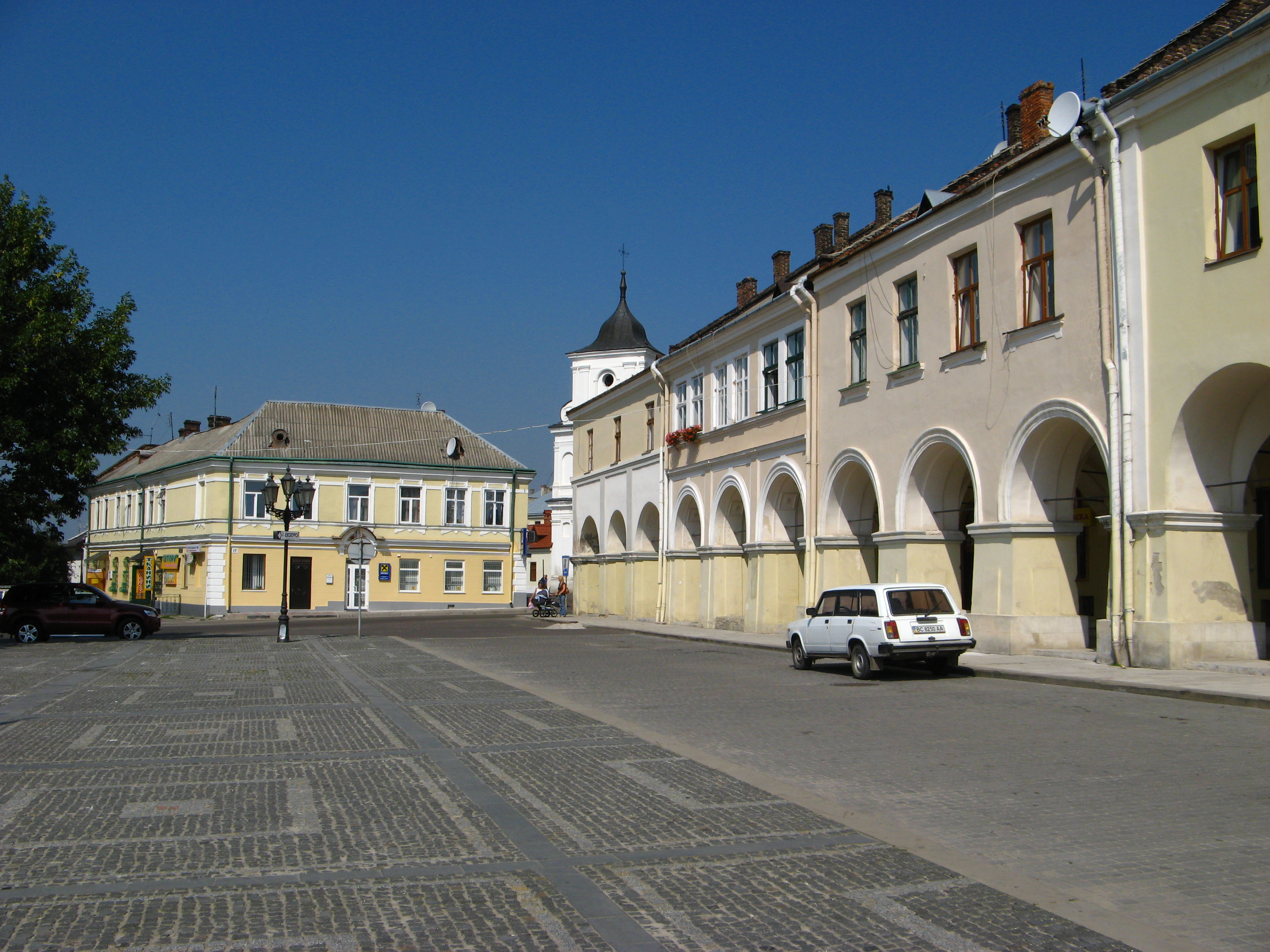
Old town

From July 1944, it was occupied by the Soviets again and in 1945 it was annexed by the Soviet Union. It became a part of Ukrainian SSR within the USSR in 1944. As a result of the actions of both the Ukrainian nationalists of the UPA and the Soviets, almost all Poles left the city in 1944–1946.

=== Recent history ===
In 1951, the town was renamed Nesterov after the Russian World War I aviator Pyotr Nesterov who became the first to perform aerial ramming in the history of aviation near Zhovkva in 1914. The name Zhovkva, which is the Ukrainian version of the historic Polish name, was restored in 1992, after Ukraine became independent from the Soviet Union.

Until 18 July 2020, Zhovkva was the administrative center of Zhovkva Raion. The raion was abolished in July 2020 as part of the administrative reform of Ukraine, which reduced the number of raions of Lviv Oblast to seven. The area of Zhovkva Raion was merged into Lviv Raion.

== Population ==
Historical population
Year	Pop.	±%
1921	7,867	—
1931	10,348	+31.5%
2022	13,852	+33.9%

=== Language ===
Distribution of the population by native language according to the 2001 census:

Language	Number	Percentage
Ukrainian	13 046	97.97%
Russian	243	1.82%
Other or undecided	27	0.21%
Total	13 316	100.00%

== Historical sites ==
Historic sights of Zhovkva (examples)

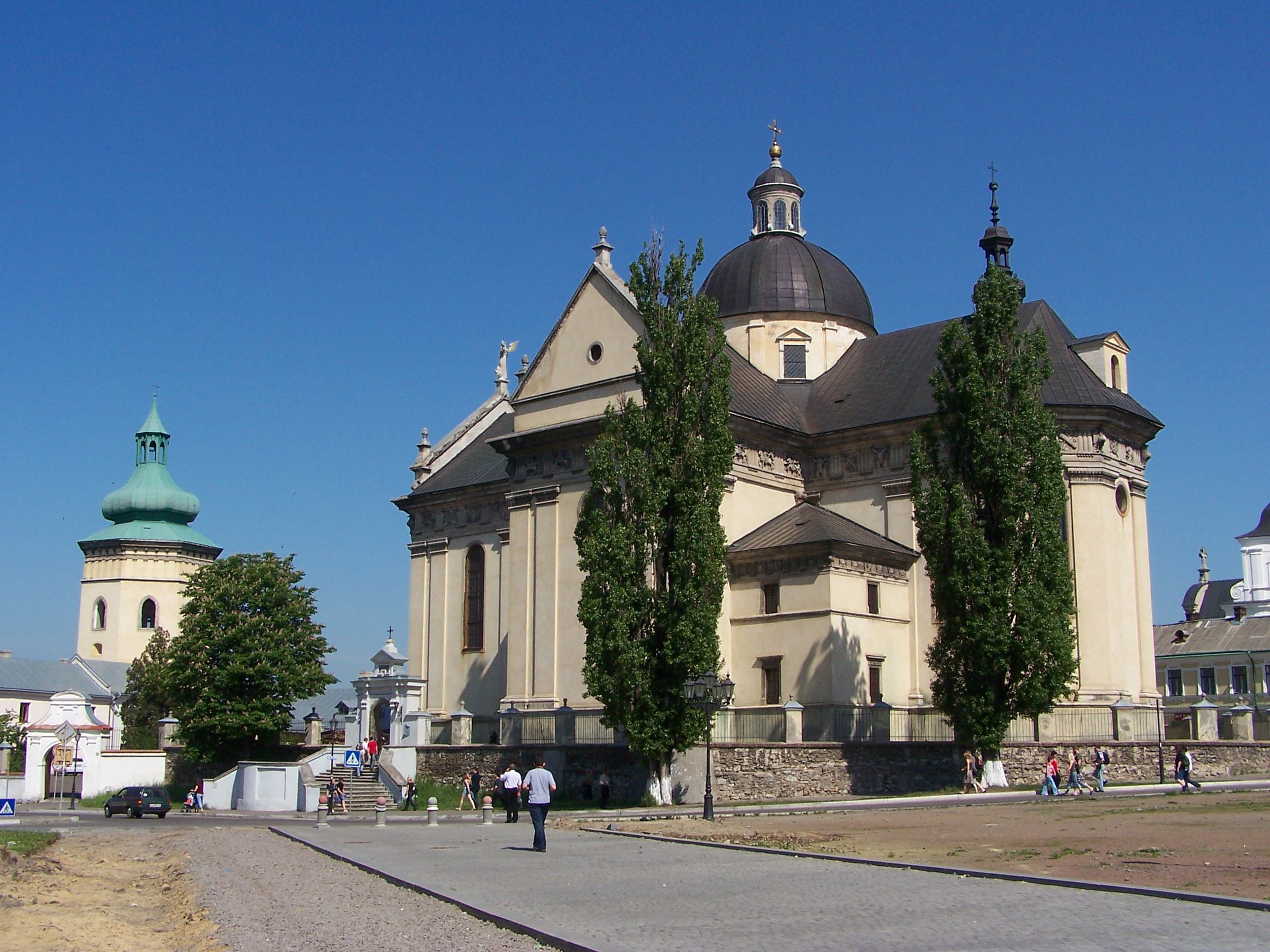
Collegiate Church of St. Lawrence

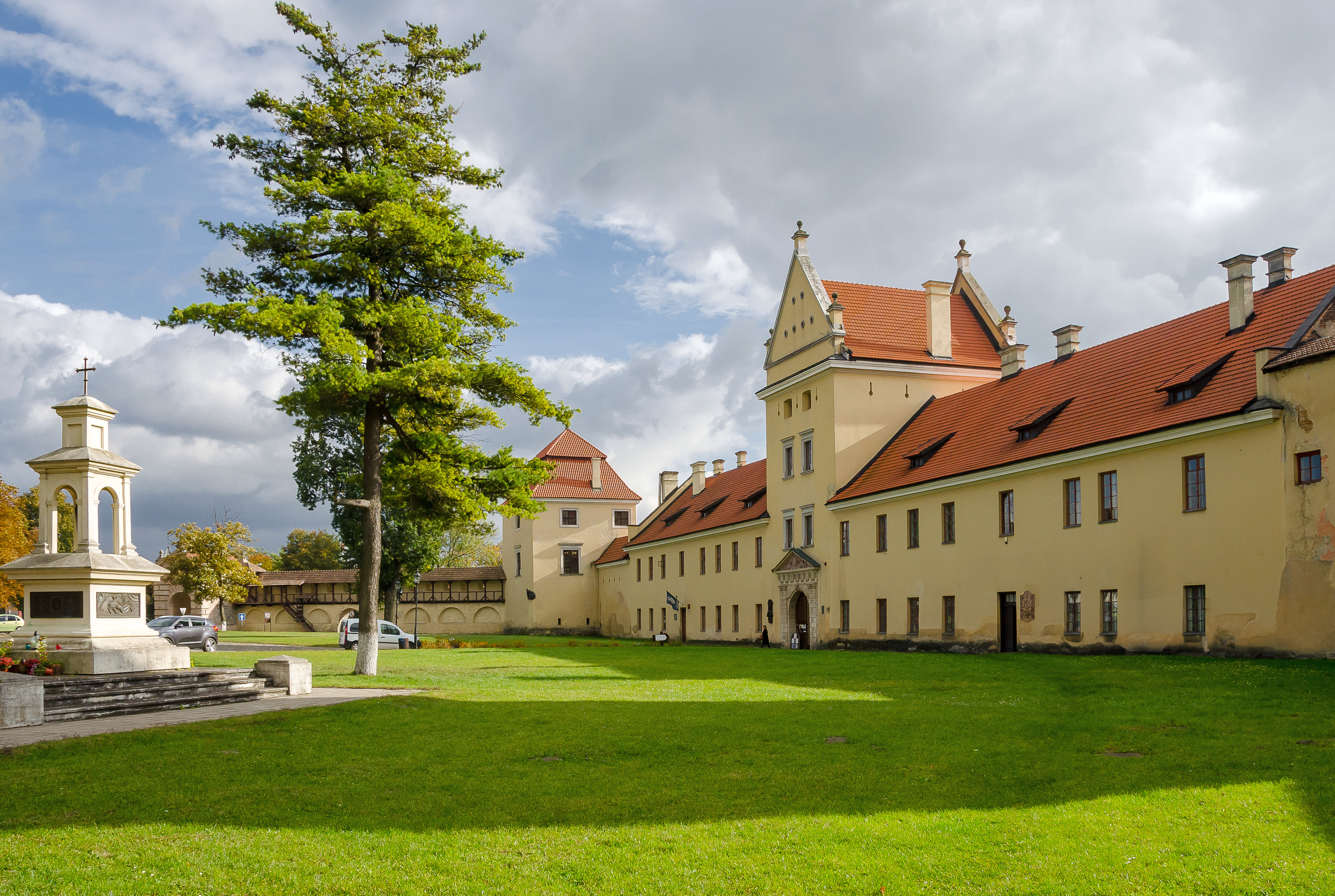
Zhovkva Castle

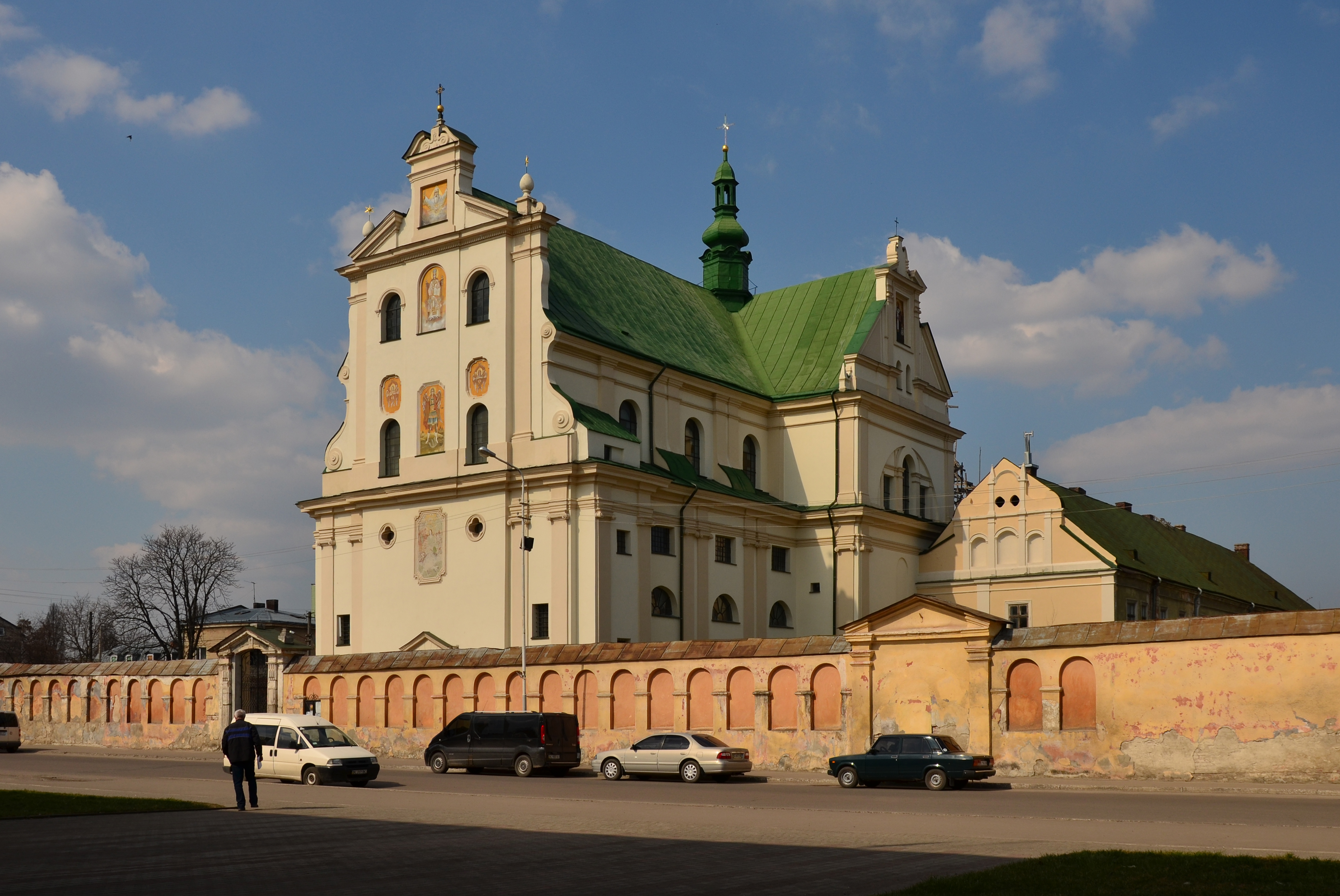
Dominican church

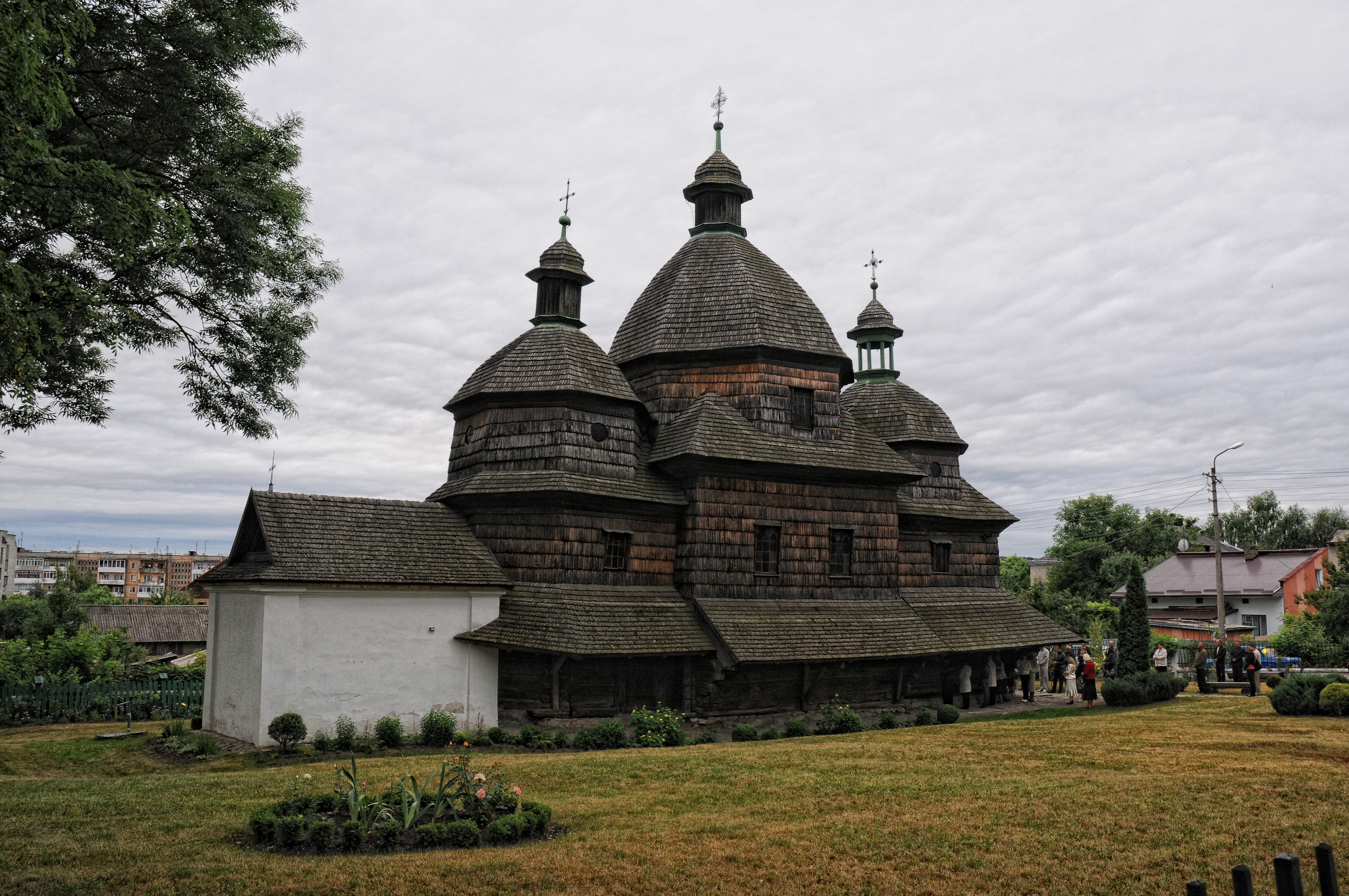
Holy Trinity Church

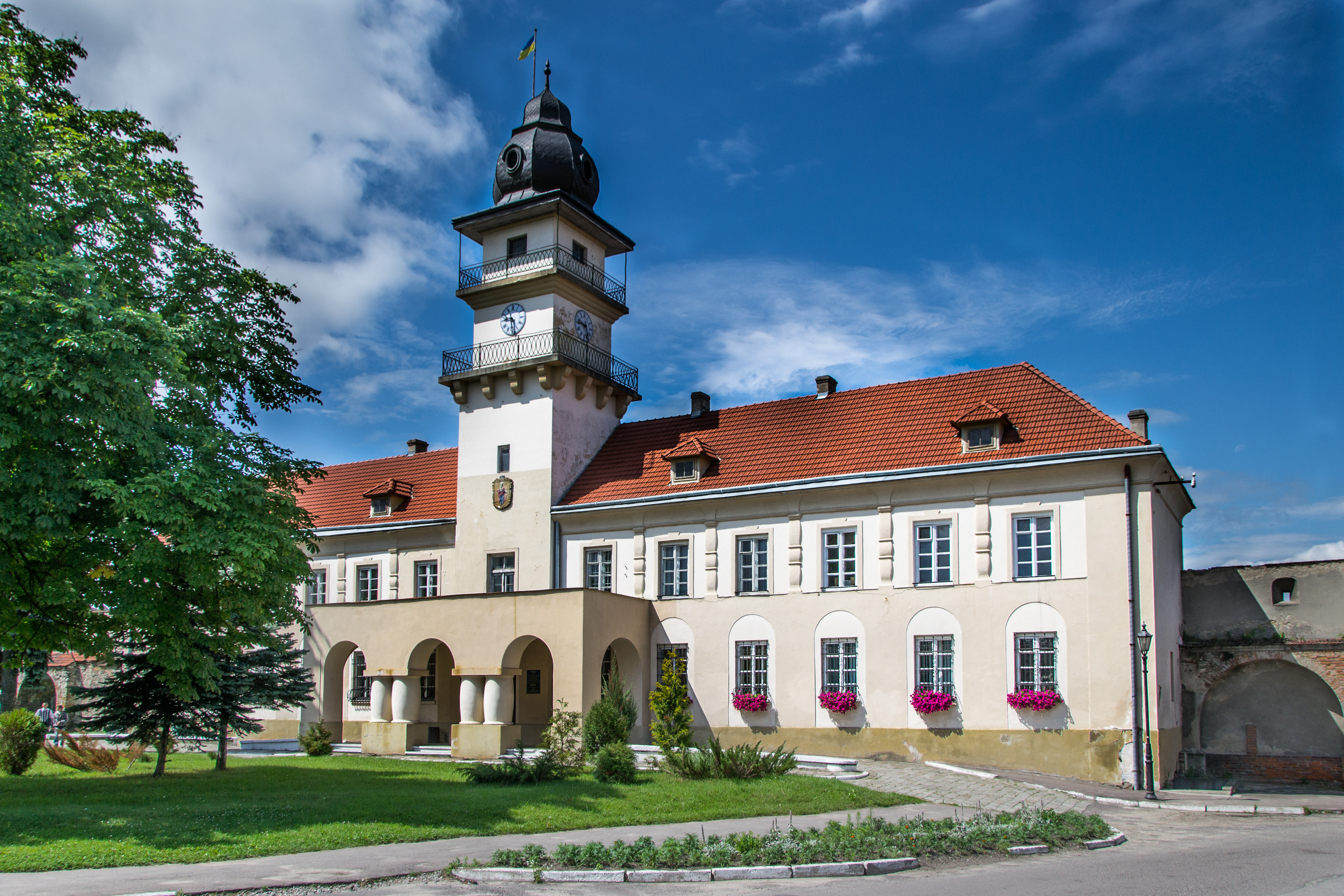
Town Hall

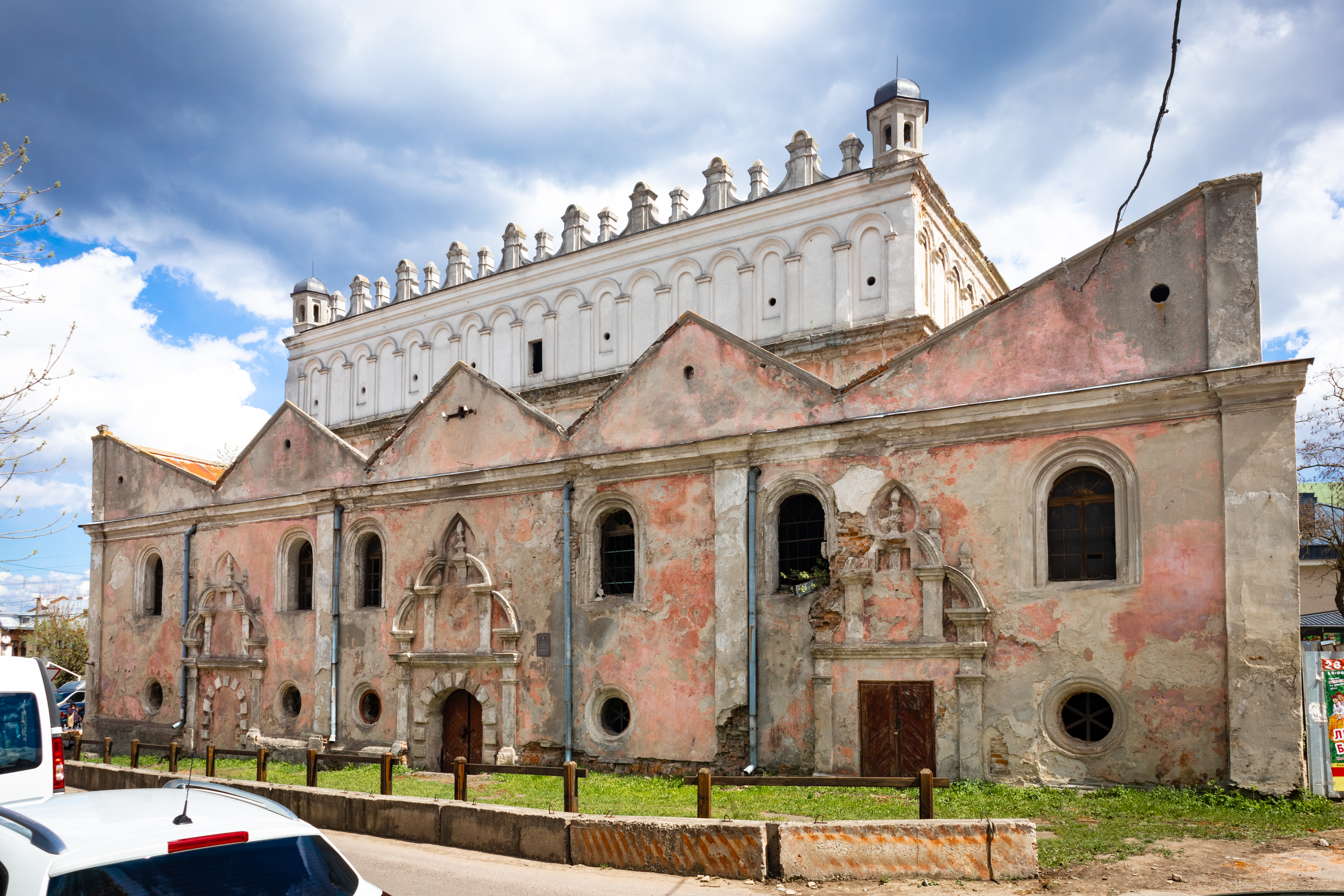
Synagogue

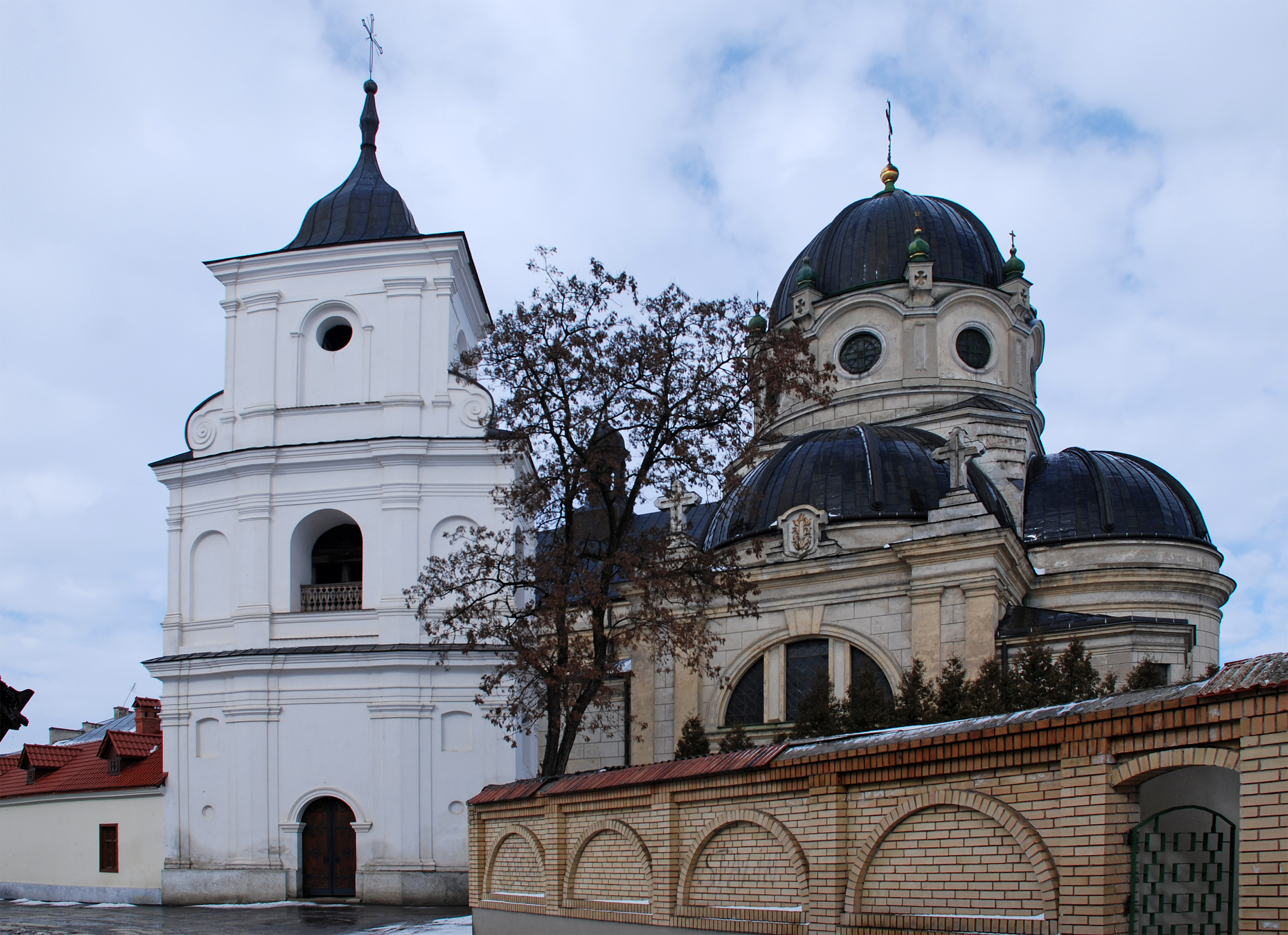
Basilian Monastery

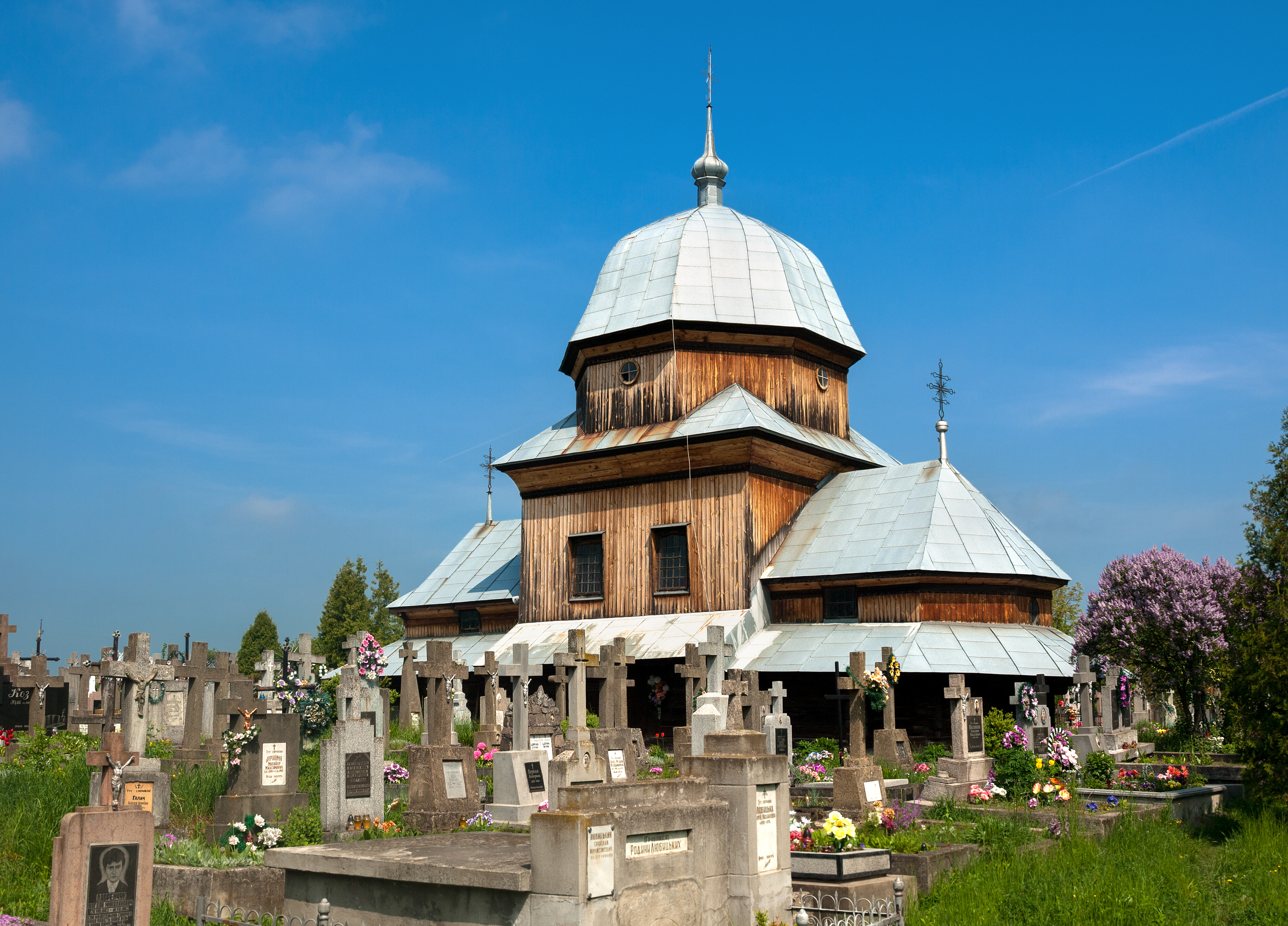
Church of the Nativity of Theotokos

The Collegiate Church of St. Lawrence, a domed church from the 17th century founded by Stanisław Żółkiewski and built by a group of Italian architects, was turned into a warehouse under Soviet rule. After Ukraine declared independence in the early 1990s, the church was restored. The church contains the sarcophagus of the city's founder Stanisław Żółkiewski.

The town center of Zhovkva was declared a heritage site in 1994, and restoration work is now under way. Zhovkva Castle, the town's oldest and largest building, former residence of hetman Stanisław Żółkiewski and King John III Sobieski, is being converted into a culture and conference hall.

The wooden Holy Trinity Church built in 1720 by Polish prince Konstanty Władysław Sobieski, was listed in 2013 as a World Heritage Site by UNESCO, as a part of the composite site Wooden Tserkvas of the Carpathian region in Poland and Ukraine.

A Renaissance architecture fortified synagogue, built between 1692 and 1698, and co-financed by Polish King John III Sobieski, is located in the town.

=== Basilian Monastery in Zhovkva ===
In 1682 a Basilian monastery was established in Zhovkva with the support of bishop Yosyf Shumlyansky. After being destroyed by a fire in 1690, the monastery was rebuilt with the help of king Jan Sobieski. In 1753 it was elevated to the status of archimandry and received landholdings from prince Radziwiłł. The relics of John the New of Suceava were placed in the monastery until 1783. Relics of Saint Parthenius, 3rd-century Christian martyr from Rome were moved to the monastery in 1784. They are kept at the Church of Holy Heart of Jesus, which functions as part of the monastery.

Following the reform of the Order of Saint Basil the Great, in 1895 a publishing house was established at the monastery. Between 1897 and 1944 a monthly magazine was published there. In 1907 the monastery was restored, and in the 1930s its interiors were decorated by Yulian Butsmaniuk. In 1946 the monastery was forced to cease its activities and shut down. In 1990, the it was returned to Basilian monks and subordinated to the Ukrainian Greek Catholic Church. In 2003 a new iconostasis was created by local masters.

== Notable people ==
- Aaron Margalita, Jewish scholar who converted to Christianity
- Aaron Selig ben Moses of Zolkiev, Jewish scholar
- Aaron of Trebowla, Jewish scholar
- Ivan Rutkovych, Ukrainian iconographer
- Job Kondzelevych, Ukrainian monk and iconographer
- Ivan Krypiakevych, Ukrainian historian, academician
- Zbigniew Burzyński, Polish balloonist and constructor of balloons, pioneer of Polish balloons
- Clara Kramer, Holocaust survivor
- Salcia Landmann, researcher of Yiddish culture
- Jakub Ludwik Sobieski, Polish prince, son of King John III Sobieski
- Jakub Sobieski, Polish parliamentarian, military leader and father of King John III Sobieski
- Włodzimierz Puchalski, Polish photographer and film director
- Stanisław Żółkiewski, Polish nobleman and military commander, founder of the town
- Włodzimierz Stożek, Polish mathematician of the Lwów School of Mathematics
- Hillel ben Naphtali Zevi, Lithuanian rabbi
- Nachman Krochmal, Jewish philosopher
- Jacob ben Wolf Kranz, maggid
- Zalman Schachter-Shalomi, one of the founders of the Jewish Renewal movement and an innovator in ecumenical dialogue
- Hersch Lauterpacht, member of the United Nations' International Law Commission
- Lubomyr Romankiw, Ukrainian computer scientist

== See also ==
- Aaron of Cardena
