= St. Lawrence's Church, Zhovkva =

Roman Catholic church in Zhovkva, Ukraine

Coordinates: 50°03′22″N 23°58′09″E

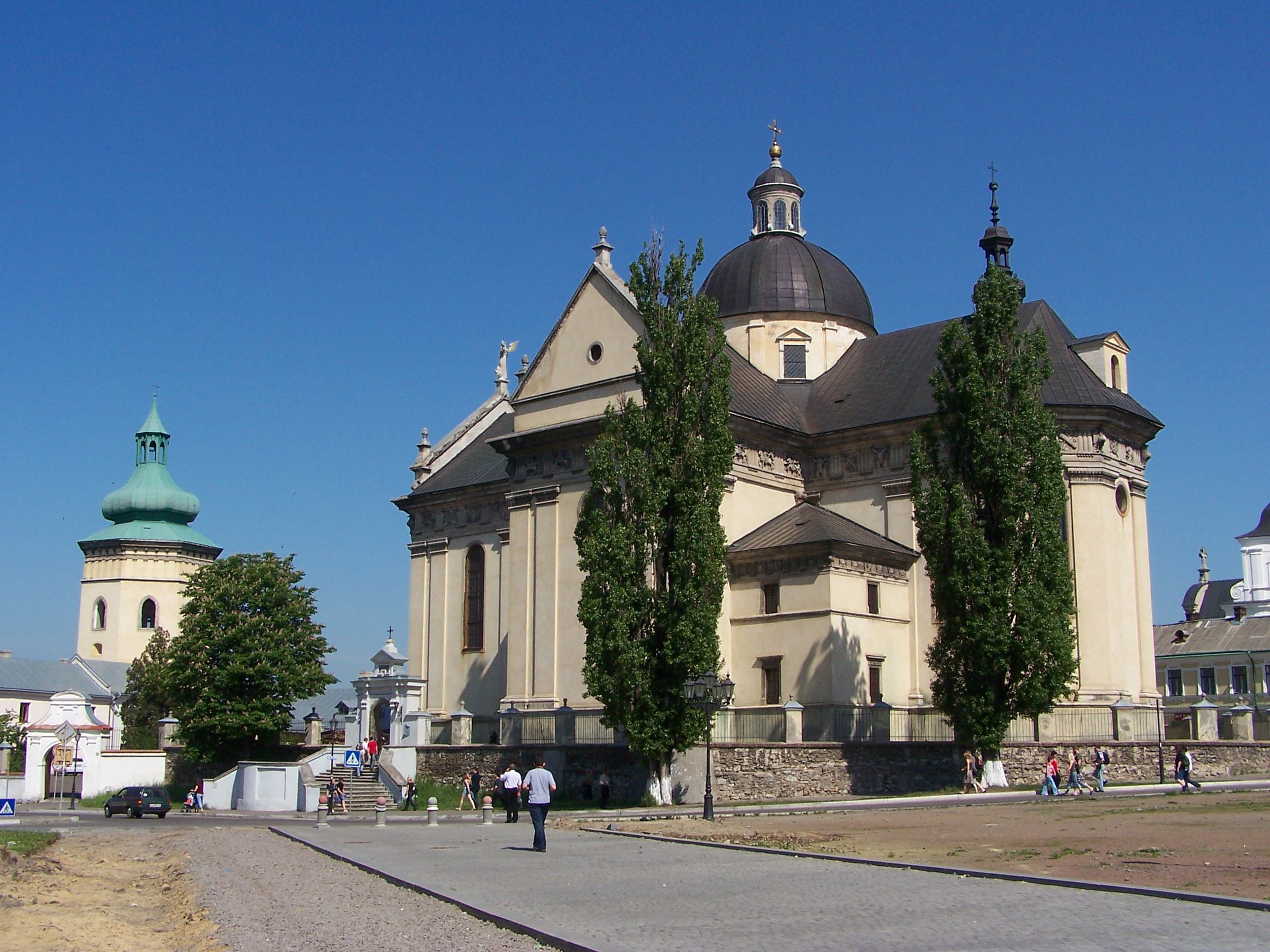
Rear view of the church seen from the main square

The Collegiate Church of St. Lawrence (Ukrainian: Костел святого Лаврентія у Жовкві; Polish: kolegiata św. Wawrzyńca w Żółkwi) is the main Roman Catholic church of Zhovkva, Ukraine. It was built between 1606 and 1618 as the pantheon of the Polish commander Stanisław Żółkiewski and his family.

== Description ==
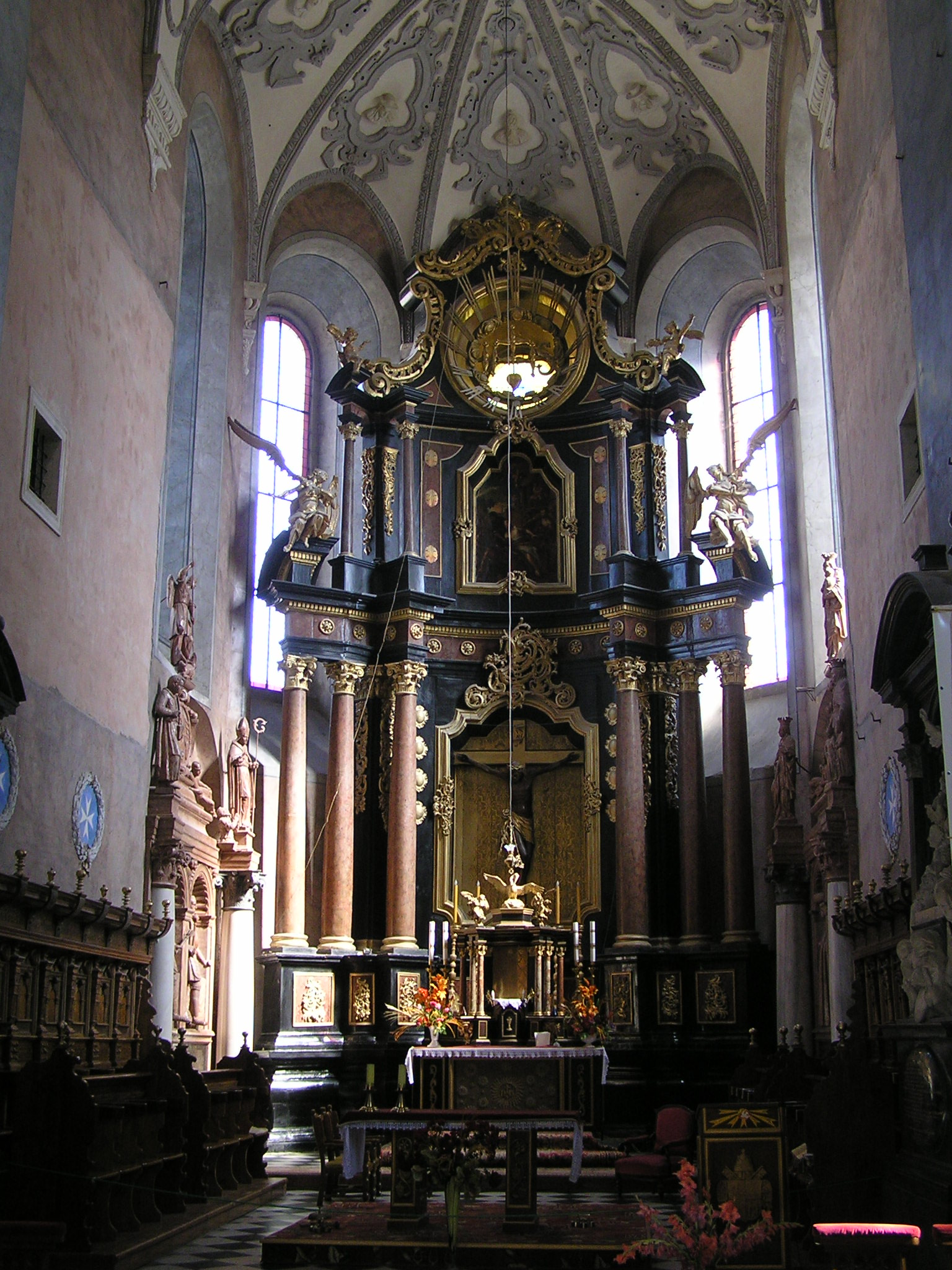
The interior

The building's design is attributed to a team of Italian Mannerist architects active in Lviv in the early 17th century. Started by Paolo the Lucky, continued by Paolo of Rome, and Ambrozy Przychylny (Ambrosius Simonis, an Italian from Engadin). The building is raised on a terrace constructed by the Turkish captives. The hexagonal bell tower, originally part of Zhovkva's fortifications, leans somewhat to the east.

The frieze and some parts of the interior recall martial events. Especially notable are two statues attributed to Andreas Schlüter. The dome is heavily coffered. In the 17th century, the walls of the church were decorated with pictorial representations of Żółkiewski's and Sobieski's battles executed by Szymon Boguszowicz and Martin Altamonte, among others. They have since been moved to Olesko Castle.

Apart from the Żółkiewski, the church contains the family vaults of their relatives such as the Daniłowicz and the Sobieski, notably Jakub Sobieski, father of Polish King John III Sobieski. The church is often viewed as a shrine to the golden age of Polish military achievement; so much so that its ongoing restoration has been sponsored by the Warsaw University of Technology and the Polish military.

== See also ==
- 17th-century Western domes
