= Jakub Sobieski =

Polish noble, parliamentarian, diarist, political activist and military leader

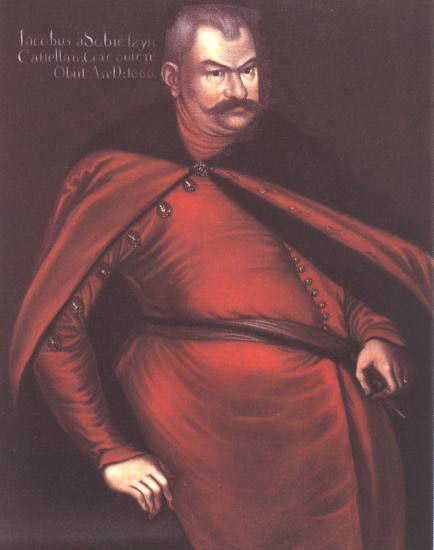
- Coat of arms: Janina
- Full name: Jakub Sobieski herbu Janina
- Born: 5 May 1590; Zółkiew, Polish–Lithuanian Commonwealth
- Died: 23 June 1646 (aged 56); Zółkiew, Polish–Lithuanian Commonwealth
- Buried: St. Lawrence's Church, Zhovkva
- Family: Sobieski
- Consort: Marianna Wiśniowiecka; Zofia Teofillia Daniłowicz
- Issue: with Marianna Wiśniowiecka; Teresa Sobieska; Gryzelda Sobieska with Zofia Teofillia Daniłowicz; Marek Sobieski; King John III Sobieski; Katarzyna Sobieska; Anna Rozalia Sobieska; Zofia Sobieska; Stanisław Sobieski; Stanisław Sobieski II
- Father: Marek Sobieski
- Mother: Jadwiga Snopkowska

Jakub Sobieski (5 May 1590 – 23 June 1646) was a Polish noble, parliamentarian, diarist, political activist, military leader and father of King John III Sobieski. He was the son of castellan and voivode Marek Sobieski and Jadwiga Snopkowska.

== Biography ==
Sobieski was educated in Kraków and Paris. He was a famed orator and parliamentarian. He participated in the military expedition (Dymitriads) against Russia in 1617-1618 (wounded during the assault of Moscow), and was a member of the War Council (Rada wojenna) of King Władysław IV. He took part in negotiations with Muscovy in the Truce of Deulino in 1618. Subsequently, he fought in the Chocim expedition against the Ottoman Empire in 1621, and the expedition against Abazy Pasa in 1633. He was one of the negotiations with Sweden in the Treaty of Stuhmsdorf (Sztumska Wieś) in 1635.

After his marriage to Zofia Teofillia Daniłowicz his wealth increased significantly, as Zofia brought in her inheritance after the Żółkiewski family and part of the Daniłowski family estates, including Żółkiew Castle.

=== Official career ===
He was courtier since 1617, Krajczy of the Crown since 1626, Podczaszy of the Crown since 1636, voivode of Belz Voivodeship since 1638 and of Ruthenian Voivodeship since 1641 and castellan of Kraków since 1646. Starost of Trembowla, Krasnystaw, Jaworów, Stryj, Kałusz, Bar and Gniewo. Elected Deputy to seven Sejms between 1623 and 1632, as Sejm Marshal he led the ordinary Sejm in Warsaw from 24 January to 5 March 1623 and from 27 January to 10 March 1626, the extraordinary Sejm in Warsaw from 27 June to 18 July 1628 and the Election Sejm in Warsaw from 24 September to 15 November 1632.

== Character ==
He was considered by his contemporaries a wise and honorable person. Member of many commissions and diplomatic bodies, he often acted as a mediator or as a guardian of orphaned children. In politics, he usually supported king's plans, but was also a defender of the nobility rights and religious tolerance.

== Children ==
- Marek became starost.
- John became Marshal, Hetman and King of Poland.
- Katarzyna married Władysław Dominik Zasławski and Michał Kazimierz Radziwiłł.
- Anna Rozalia became a Benedictine nun in Lwów.

== Works ==
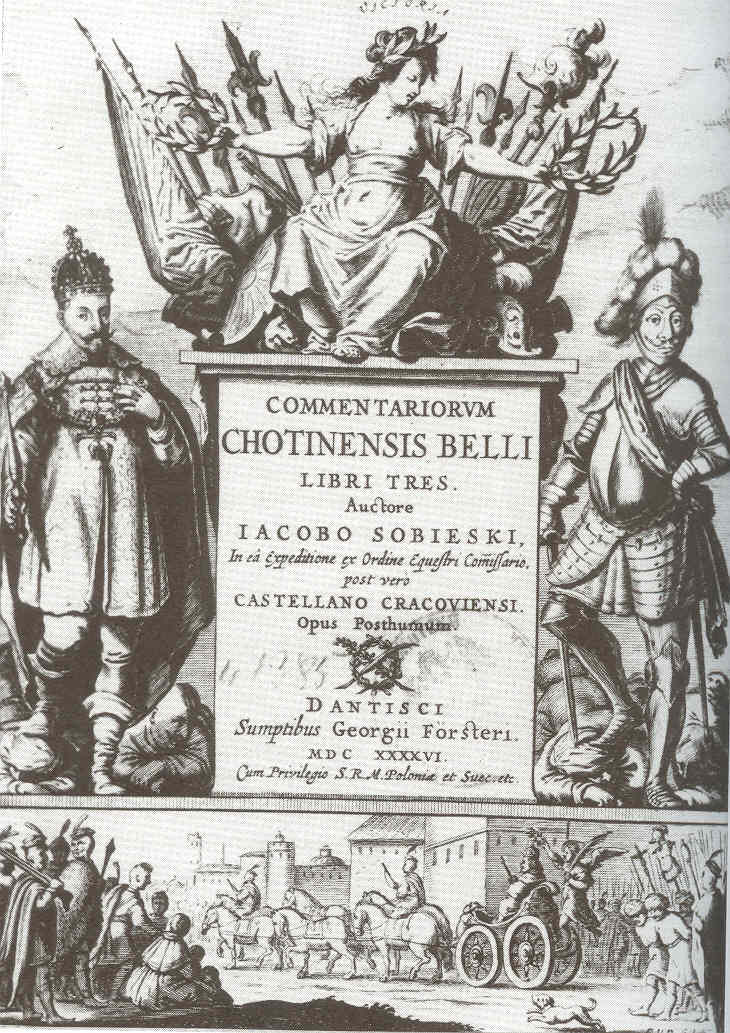
Commentariorum chotinensis belli libri tres

During the Chocim expedition in 1621 he wrote a diary called Commentariorum chotinensis belli libri tres (Pamiętnik wojny chocimskiej - Diary of the Chocim War), which was published in 1646 in Danzig. It was used by Wacław Potocki as a basis for his epic poem, Transakcja wojny chocimskiej (The Progress of the War of Chocim).

He authored Commentariorum Chotinensis belli libri tres (1646) and instructions for his sons journeying to Kraków (1640) and France (1645) which are seen as a prime example of liberal education of that era.

== See also ==
- Zolochiv Castle
