= The Beginning and Progress of the Muscovy War =

Book by Stanisław Żółkiewski

The Beginning and Progress of the Muscovy War (Polish: Poczatek i progres wojny moskiewskiej) is a memoir written by the Polish hetman Stanisław Żółkiewski, in which he describes the events of 1609 - 1611, when he participated in the Polish–Muscovite War (1605–18).

The book was probably written in 1612 and first published in 1833 by Konstanty Slotwinski in Lwow, which at that time was part of Austrian Galicia. Slotwinski titled it The History of Muscovy War until the Capture of Smolensk.

Following the example of Julius Caesar, Zolkiewski presents himself in the third person singular. The text includes a number of examples of the Macaronic language, and the memoir is regarded as one of the finest examples of works written in the Old Polish language.

== Sources ==
- Czaplinski W., "Poczatek i progres wojny moskiewskiej", in Literatura polska : przewodnik encyklopedyczny, vol. 2, Warsaw 1985, p. 182. ISBN 83-01-05369-0
