= Battle of Reval (1602) =

1602 military conflict in Estonia during Polish-Swedish wars

- Part of the Polish–Swedish wars
Date	June 30, 1602
Location	Reval, present-day Estonia
Result	Polish-Lithuanian victory

Belligerents
Sweden	Polish–Lithuanian Commonwealth

Commanders and leaders
Reinhold Anrep	Stanisław Żółkiewski

Casualties and losses
200 killed	

The Battle of Reval took place on June 30, 1602, during the Polish–Swedish War (1600–1611) near present-day Tallinn in Estonia.

== The battle ==
The Polish forces were led by Grand Field Hetman Stanisław Żółkiewski, who had been sent against Swedish forces gathering by Tallinn by Grand Crown Hetman Jan Zamoyski. Żółkiewski attacked "on the march" with two squadrons of Polish hussars. The charge, however, was not successful.

As a result, the Swedish forces put up frisian horses as a protection against further frontal cavalry charges. Żółkiewski then sent light cavalry on a round about flanking maneuver which attacked the Swedes from behind, coinciding with another charge by the hussars. The Swedish lines broke as a result. The Swedes were led by Reinhold Anrep.
