= Ostoja Danielewicz =

Lithuanian surname

Ostoja family coat of arms

The Danielewicz family of Clan Ostoja originates probably from Russian boyar Daniel Aleksandrowicz's son Vladimir Danielewicz, that settled down in Lithuania. Danielewicz is a patronymic surname, meaning descendants of Daniel or Danilo. The family is associated with the Clan of Ostoja and Ostoja Coat of Arms.

== Danielewicz vel Danilewicz of Clan of Ostoja ==
Danielewicz, originally spelled Danilewicz, was an ancient noble family name in Lithuania, Russia and in the Polish–Lithuanian Commonwealth. On the political scene Danielewicz supported the Clan of Ostoja expansion in the 15th century and in Lithuania was closely related to first Sakowicz family and later to the Pac family. In medieval times, nobles in Lithuania with the power of judging like Danielewicz were called barones according to Jan Długosz. All separate lines of Ostoja Danielewicz claim origin from Knyaz family which proved to be courtesy title and recognition for the family since medieval times but not hereditary title.

During many centuries, Ostoja Danielewicz family was holding high offices as Lords of Regality (Starosta) and Judge.

Iwaszko Danielewicz was viceregent of former Principality of Polotsk between 1477 and 1484 on behalf of voivode Bohdan Sakowicz.

=== Ostoja Danielewicz vel Danilewicz during the time of Commonwealth ===
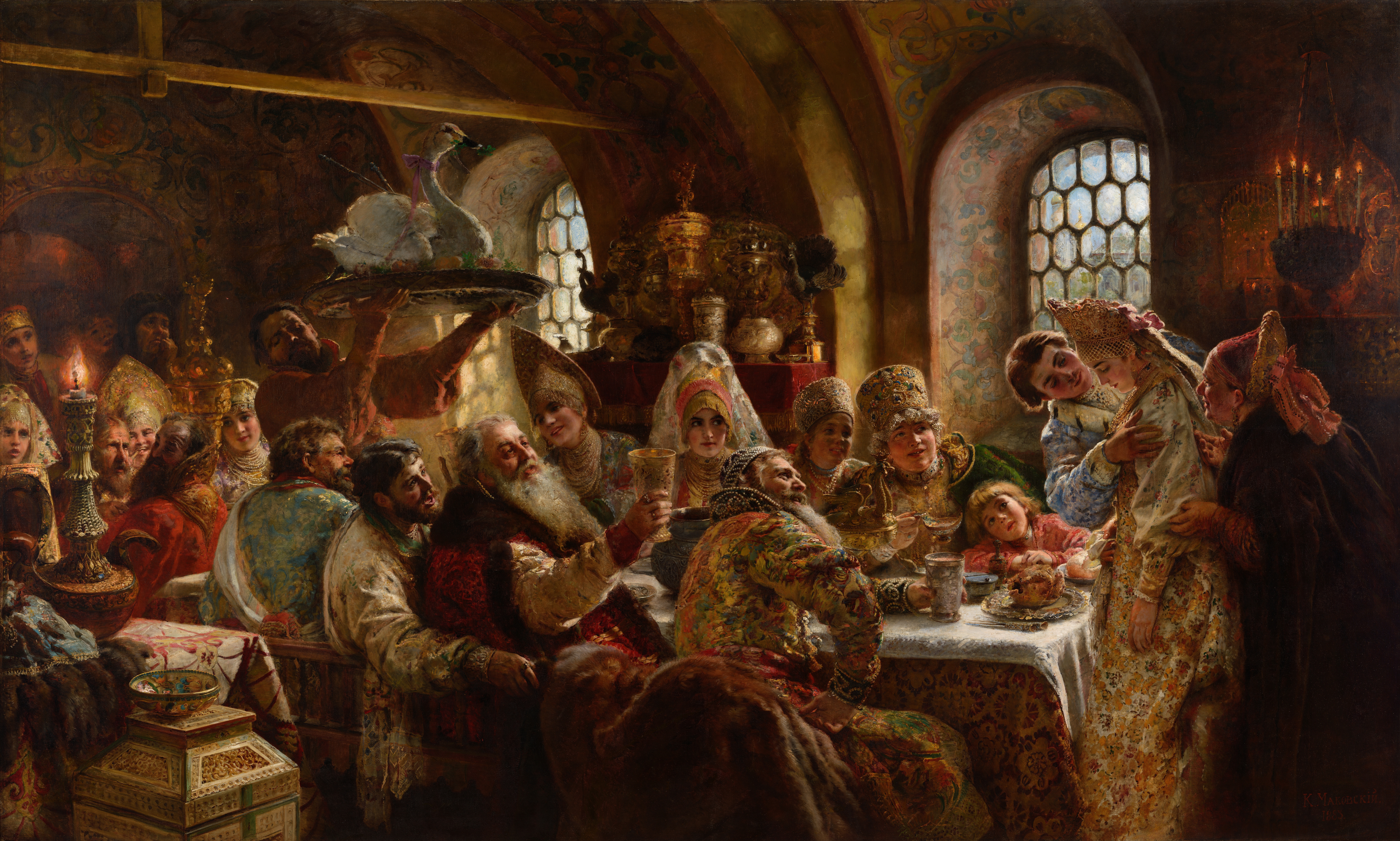
Boyar Wedding Feast

The Danielewicz vel Danilewicz of Ostoja family are to be found mainly among officials in the districts of Vilnius, Ashmyany, Trakai and Vilkmergė. Iwaszko Iwanowicz Danielewicz attended at the Royal Court in Kraków year 1511, his brother Fedor attended same court year 1523. Jerzy Danilewicz was professor in moral-theology and also confessor to prince Zygmunt Karol Radziwiłł.

=== In coalition with Pac family ===
The Pac family rose into the power of controlling Belarus and Lithuania after the war between the Commonwealth and Sweden, then, at the same time, the Cossack war and also the war with Russia and when the Catholic and Protestant movements in Europe struggled for the power. The time was the middle of the 17th century when Pac and Danielewicz families stood strong behind the King and did not support the Radziwiłł family. After those wars, on behalf of the King of Poland and Grand Duke of Lithuania, John II Casimir Vasa, the Pac family could rule Grand Duchy of Lithuania together with their closest allies like Danielewicz.

In 1653 the property of Bohdanow named after Prince Bohdan Pawłowicz Sapieha in Belarus were passed to Barbara, daughter of Prince Karzimierz Sapieha. Barbara's daughter Tekla Wollowicz then married Piotr Michał Pac and the property passed to the Pac family. Since Piotr Michał Pac had no children of his own, he adopted Michał Danielewicz,(Starosta of Plotelsk, Inspector of the Hungarian border) into the Pac family as he was the son of his sister Katarzyna Pac. As result of that, large property of Bohdanow, the town of Kartena and other properties was passed from the Pac family to Danielewicz.

Ostoja Danielewicz family owned several big properties in Lithuania, Prussia, Belarus and Volyn, Ukraine and held high ranking offices in the Polish-Lithuanian Commonwealth, mostly in the Grand Duchy of Lithuania. Through the centuries Danielewicz was highly respected for and their knowledge in jurisdiction and therefore was often granted the position of Starosta (Lord of Regality) or County Judge as they also many times represented their districts and provinces at the Sejm, the Parliament of the Commonwealth. Danielewicz raised in great power and wealth during the time when the Pac family was in the control of the Grand Duchy of Lithuania.

=== During the partitions ===
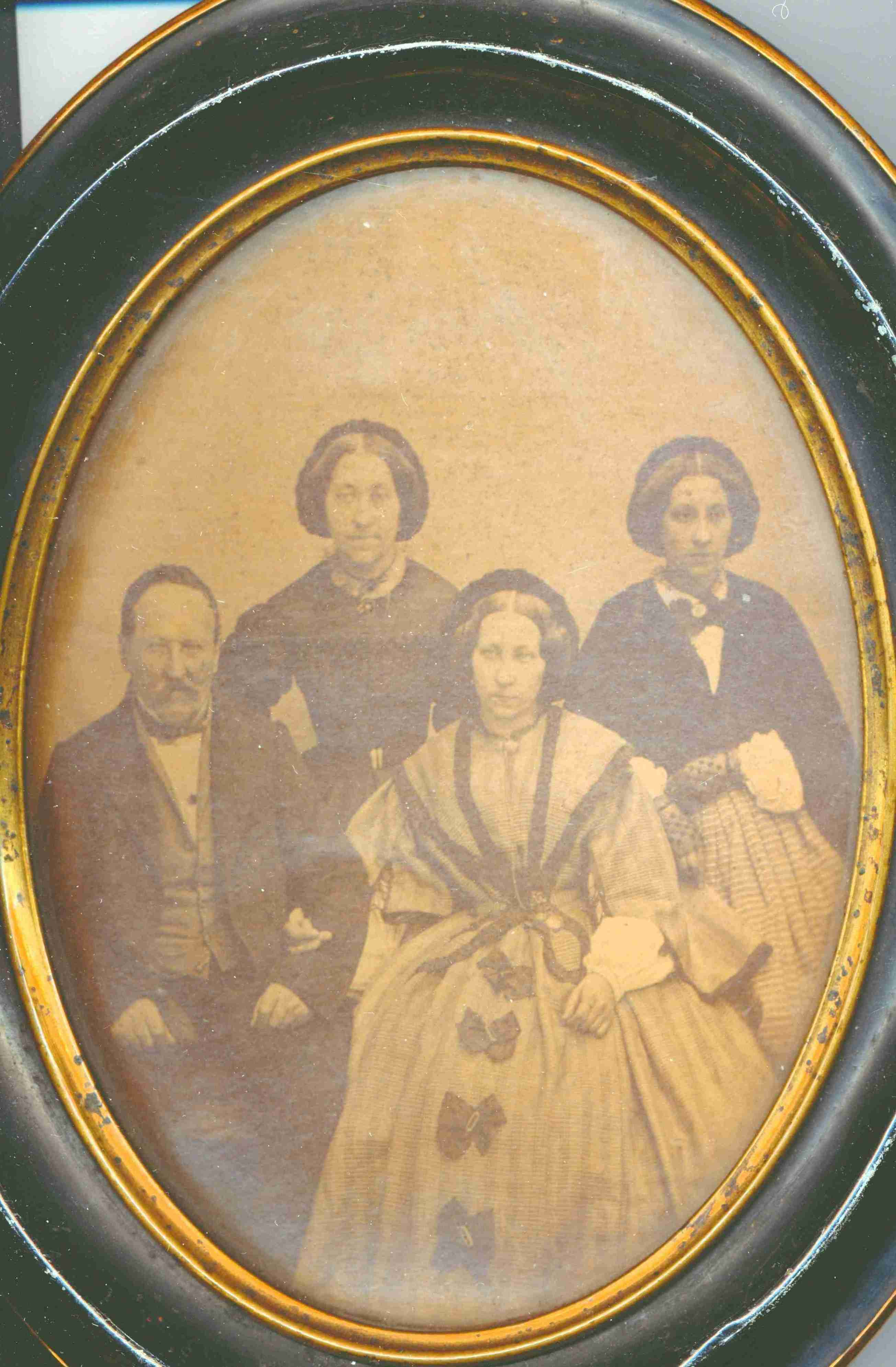
Wincenty Danilewicz with daughters

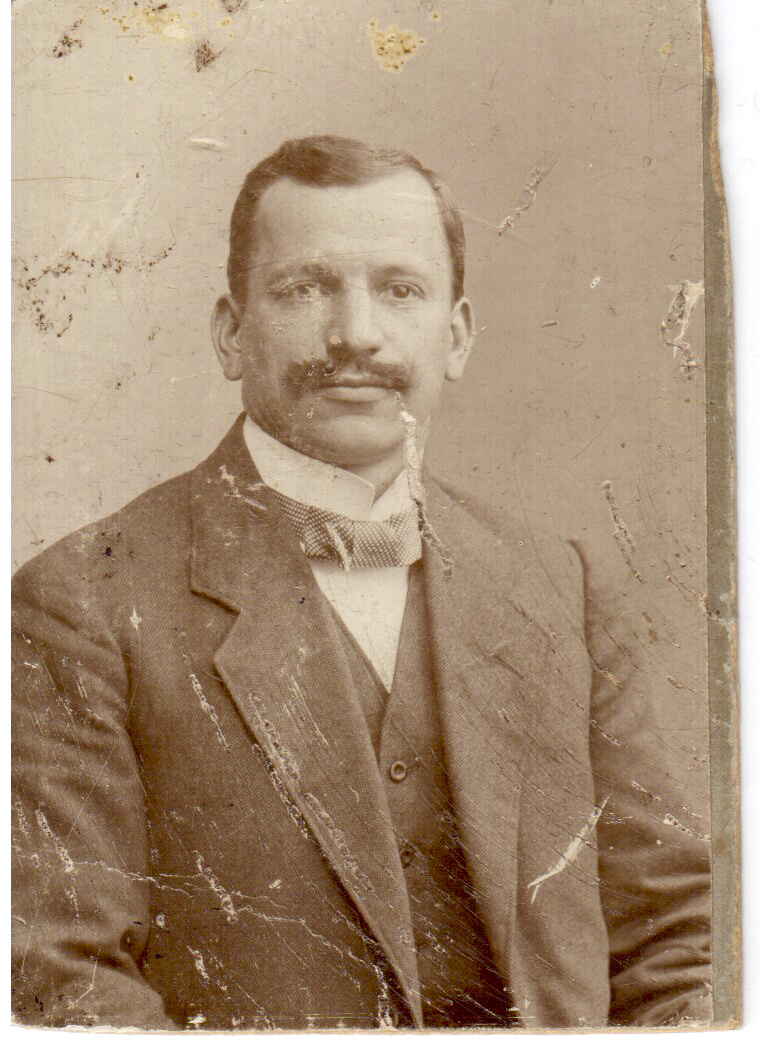
Józef Ostoja Danielewicz

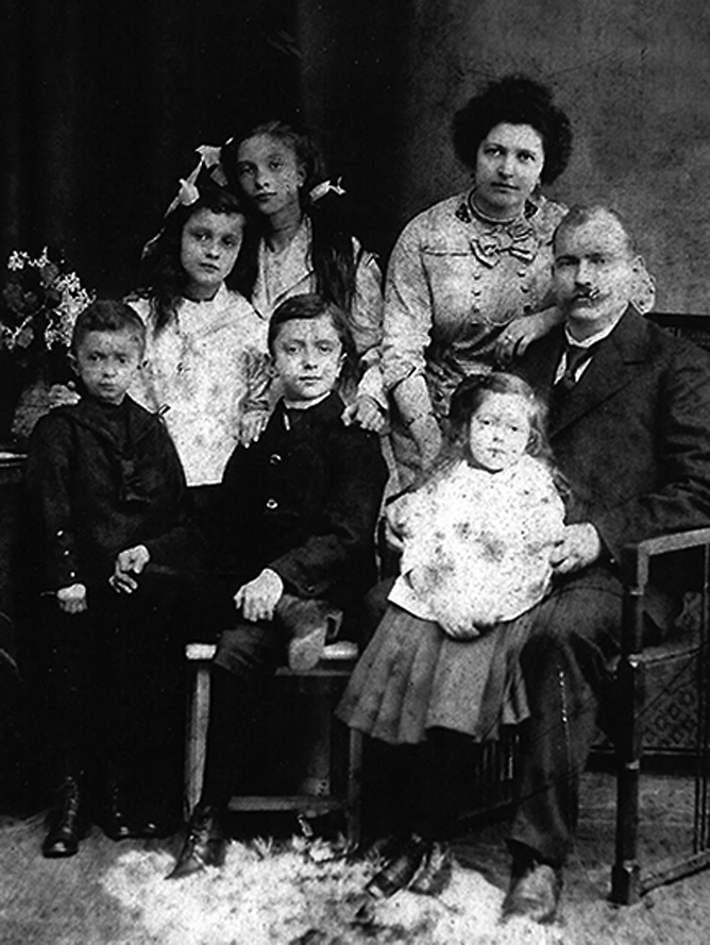
Agnieszka of Ostoja Danilewicz and her husband Rudolf Koppitz with children.

The dominance of the Pac family ended because of a lack of heirs and their position was overtaken by the Sapieha family. In the middle of the 19th century the last of the Pac family, Ludwik Michał Pac lost all great properties as they were confiscated by the Russian side for his involvement in November Uprising and his participation in Napoleonic wars against the Russian side. Since the Pac family become extinct, descendants of the line of the Michał Danielewicz are the only ones to continue the heritage of the Pac due to adoption of him and his descendants.

During the Partitions of Poland or Partitions of the Polish–Lithuanian Commonwealth 1772–1918, Danielewicz's of Ostoja participated in many upraising actions witch cause Russian side to confiscate most of the family properties. As the family did not support foreign forces in the Commonwealth and was in opposition, no offices were given to the family anymore. In the end of 18th century part of the family moved to Prussia where they joined Prussian army as officers in hope to fight Russian side that was holding control of the east part of the Commonwealth. After the Napoleonic Wars, Marcin Danielewicz received the Order of the White Eagle for his efforts in the fight for the independence of the Commonwealth and Wincenty Danilewicz received French Order of Legion of Honour. Jan Danielewicz died on the fields of Olszynka Grochowska in November Uprising, Piotr Danielewicz participated in 1863 Upraising in Vilnius (the January Uprising) and after the uprising failed was sent to Siberia from where he never came back.

At the end of the 19th century, the family was divided into three lines; the Prussian, Lithuanian-Belarus and Volhynia line. Of over 26 male lines recorded very few survived and the Volhynia line of Ostoja-Danielewicz was excluded from Russian nobility ranks after taking part in uprisings and anti-Russian activities. The main line of the family that sold all major properties including Bohdanow and moved to Prussia.

=== Notable family members of Ostoja Danielewicz vel Danilewicz ===
References for the below named historical persons: Adam Boniecki "Herbarz Polski" Warsaw 1899-1913 (ref.1), Łoza S.: Legia honorowa w Polsce 1803–1923 (ref.13) and Oleg Horowiec, Herbarz Szlachty Wołyńskiej Tom 7 pp. 101-109 (ref.2).

- Iwaszko Danielewicz - Viceregent of former Principality of Polotsk between 1477 and 1484
- Jerzy Danielewicz (1595-1652) - professor in moral-theology, confessor to prince Zygmunt Karol Radziwiłł
- Paweł Danielewicz - Judge of Vilnius 1648, Lord of regality of Intursk, Marshal of the Lithuanian Court of Justice
- Samuel Danilewicz (d. after 1670) – Rittmaister of Bracław Voivodeship, Lord of Tułowo
- Adam Karol Danielewicz - Judge of Vilnius
- Roman Danielwicz - Lord of regality of Intursk, deputy to the Sejm, Chamberlain of Oszmiany
- Mikołaj Danilewicz (d. after 1699) – Lord of Wierzchówka, Ołseta and other properties, sword-bearer, deputy district Judge and deputy Lord of the Regality of Wiłkomierz, elector of King Michał Korybut Wiśniowiecki.
- Michał Danielewicz - Lord of regality of Plotelsk, commissar of the Hungarian border, Lord of Seredžius, Bohdanow, Sulżyn and more
- Paweł Danielewicz (died after 1706) – Lord Chamberlain of Wenden Voivodeship
- Franciszek Danielewicz - Lord of regality of Plotelsk
- Franciszek Danielewicz - son of Franciszek, Lord of regality of Plotelsk. He was Colonel of Royal Army
- Michał Danielewicz - son of colonel Franciszek, Standard-bearer of Petyhorsk regiment and Judge of Smolensk
- Samuel Danielewicz - Rittmeister of Bracławy
- Onufry Danielewicz - Captain of Royal Army
- Tadeusz Danielewicz - Rittmeister of Trakai
- Szymon Danielewicz - Rittmeister of Trakai 1775
- Józef Danielewicz - son of Rittmeister Szymon was captain of Royal Army
- Wincenty Danilewicz - born in 1787 in Mińsk Lit. (former Polish–Lithuanian Commonwealth territory), was involved – as light-cavalryman – in the Napoleonic campaign, for which he was awarded the French Order of Legion of Honour.
- Marcin Danielewicz - received Order of the White Eagle (Poland), Major in the army of Napoleon.
- Wladyslaw Danilewicz - Lwów Eaglets (Orleta Lwowskie) 1918
- Jan Danilewicz - catholic priest, creating report for Bishop Kaczmarek. For that, he was sentenced to prison for 12 years during Stalinist time.
- Zofia Danilewicz - professor in Stomatology, Medical Academy of Łódz (1922-2013)
- Benedykt Danilewicz - professor at Collegium Medicum Jagiellonian University Krakow (1930-2015)

=== Notable properties of Ostoja Danielewicz vel Danilewicz ===
Below, list of bigger properties and small towns owned by the family of Ostoja Danielewicz.

Nieżyłowy, Teszyłowy, Chrołcewicze, Połciew, Tułowo, Leszno (Leszna nearby Minsk), Nosiłów, Kolendzin, Świrany, Balninkai, Wierzchówka, Koziniec, Podlaskie Voivodeship (pl: Zanarocz), Wielkie Sioło, Uzła (Uzła Wielka), Ołseta, Sakowicze (nest of aristocratic Sakowicz family), Kartena, Multanka, Średniki, Bohdanow, Pierzchaiły, Bukaty, Dziertyniki, Poludy, Kozierowce, Rymowicze, Nowosady, Dziesiętniki, Dowkniewicze, Goreckowszczyzna, Hołoblewszczyzna, Jachimowszczyzna, Sulżyn, Sokoleńszczyzna (nearby Vilnius), Lewszany, Gudziany, Piełaniszki, Skierzabola, Szłowin, Kalniszki.

== See also ==
- Danilewicz, Danilewicz, Danilowicz, lists of people with these surnames
- Danilewicz CoA Ostoja
