= Danilewicz family with Ostoja coat of arms =

Polish noble family

Polish medieval CoA Ostoja.

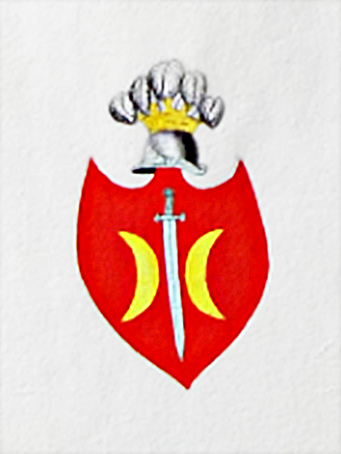
Danilewich family Ostoja CoA in Volhynia

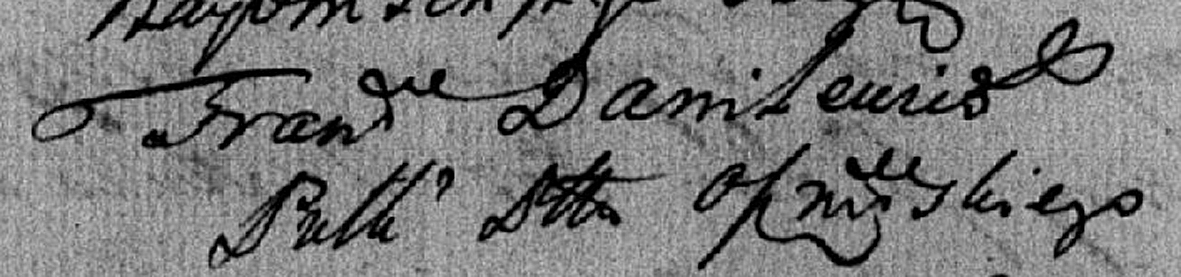
Autograph of Franciszek Danilewicz, colonel of the district Oszmiański, submitted under a letter to one of the Radziwiłł princes.

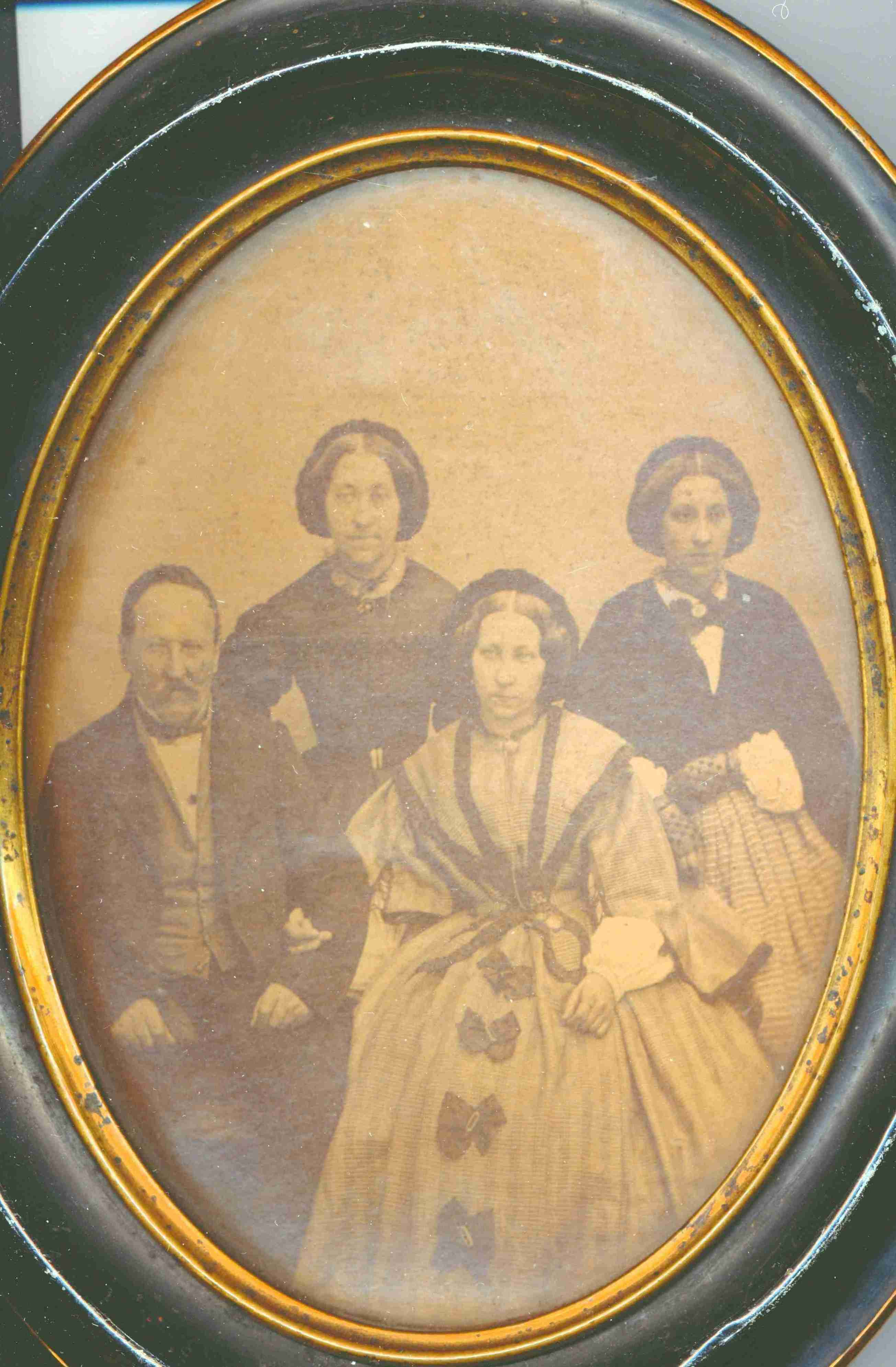
Wincenty Danilewicz (1787–1878) with his daughters, photograph from around 1850. Waleria Danilewich – second from the right (seated), standing in the back: Aneta and Julia.

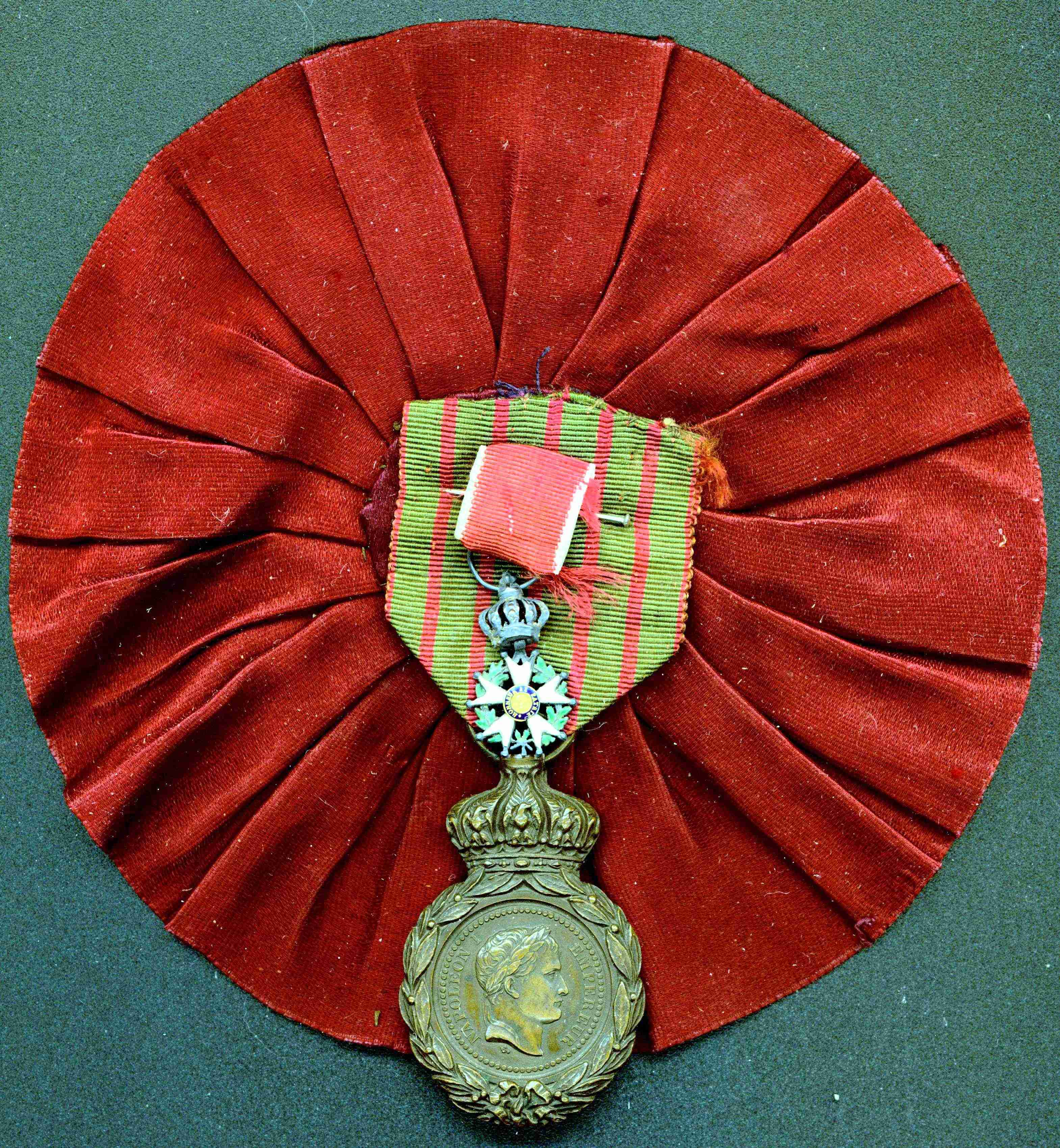
Order of the Legion of Honor of Wincenty Danilewicz.

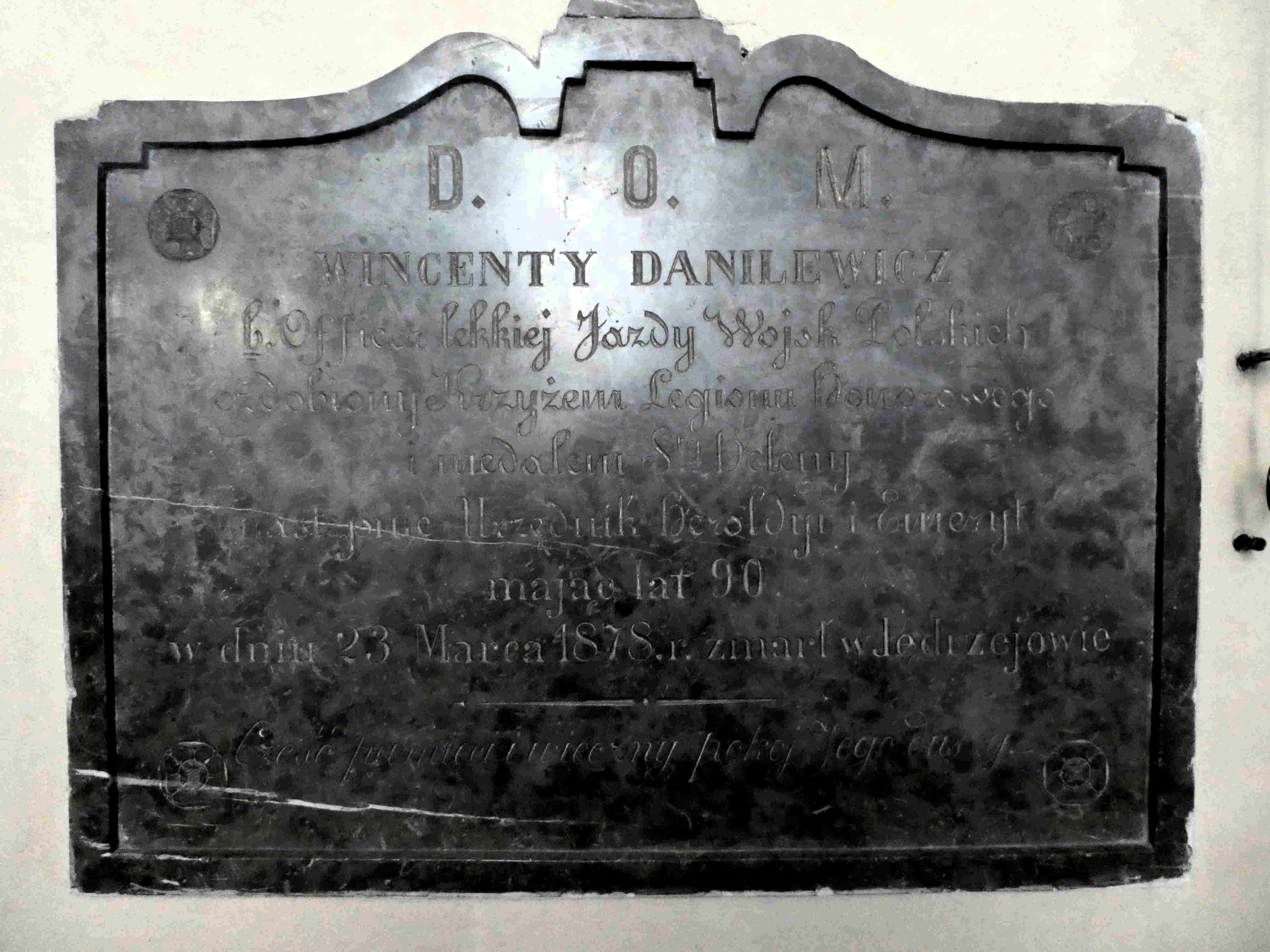
The epitaph of Wincenty Danilewicz in the Holy Trinity Church in Jędrzejów – photo by Andrzej Sokołowski, November 2018.

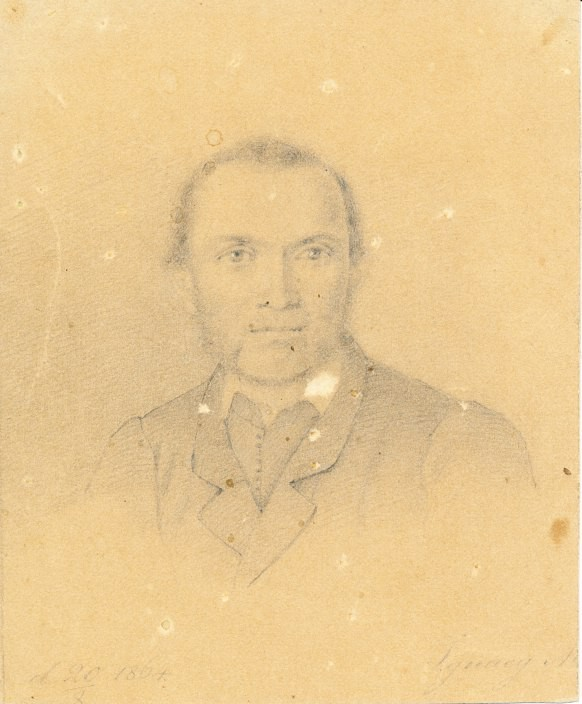
Rajmund Masłowski, husband of Waleria Danilewicz. A drawing from 1864 by an unknown author.

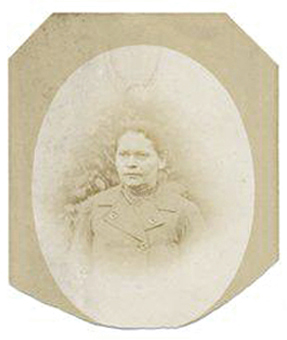
Franciszka née Krupińscy, Jelita coat of arms, the second spouse of Karol Danielewicz.

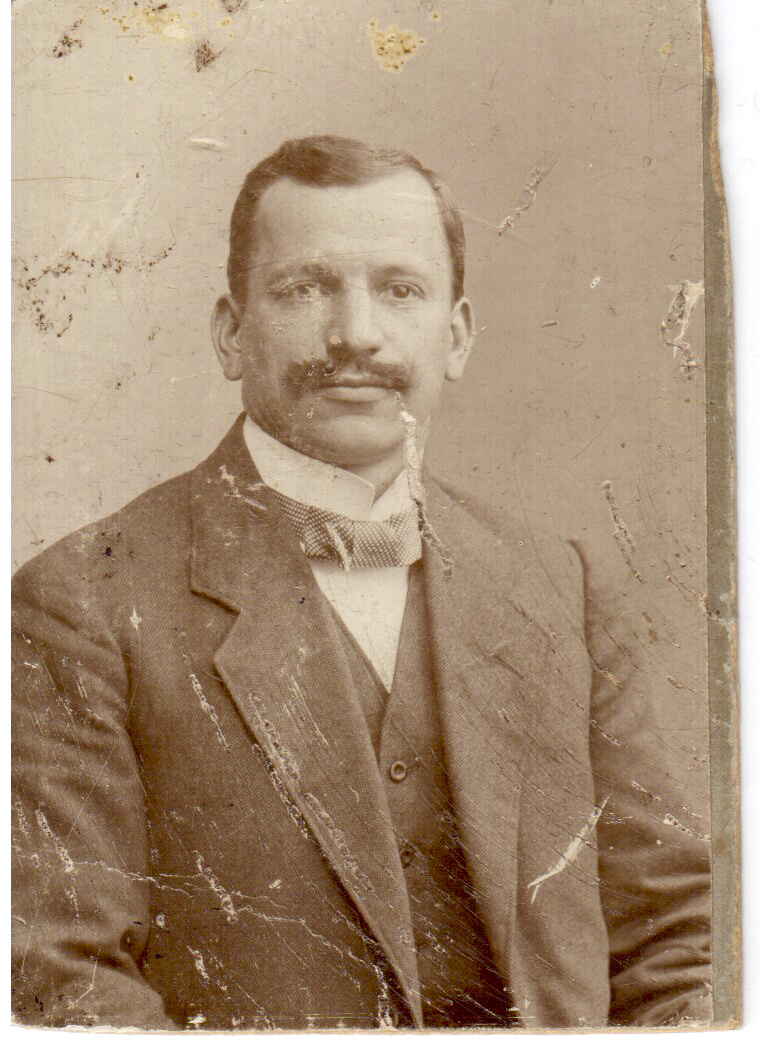
Józef Ostoja Danielewicz.

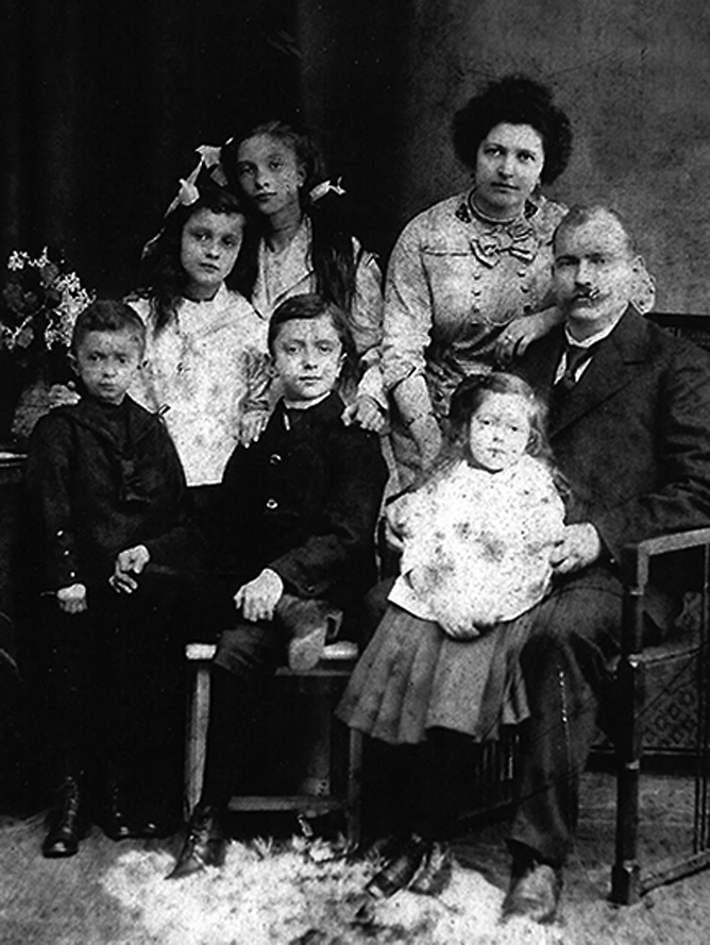
Agnieszka née Danilewicz and Rudolf, the Koppitzsch spouses with their children.

The Danilewicz (Danielewicz) family – a noble family from the Grand Duchy of Lithuania, with the coat of arms of Ostoja, belonging to the heraldic Clan Ostoja (Moscics). The Danilewicz's were mentioned by Kasper Niesiecki in Herbarz Polski.

== The oldest source certificates concerning the family's origin ==
- The etymology of the creation of the surname points to the origin of the biblical name Daniel. Danilewich (Danielewicz) is a patronymic.
- Adam Boniecki in the Count of families in the Grand Duchy of Lithuania in the fifteenth and sixteenth centuries lists people, each of whom could belong to the Danilewicz family or gave rise to a family of this surname. Boniecki mentions, among others: Jesek Danilewicz, boyar (whose father Danił Girdewicz was given by Prince Semen Romanowicz Kobryński to the village of Pryshvosty), Iwaszek and Fedor Danilewicz, sons of Ivan, royal courtiers, Ivan and Semen Danilewicz, sons of boyar Daniil Iwanowicz (to which Fedor Jarosławicz, Prince Piński, was granted in 1507 by the village of Połkotycze). According to Boniecki, the Danilewiczs probably descended from the above-mentioned Iwaszek Iwanowicz Danilewicz, a royal courtier who in 1511 received the villages of Nieżyowy and Teszyłów from King Sigismund the Old. Iwaszko and his brother Fedor (also a royal courtier in 1523) delivered three armed men on horseback from their own goods for war expeditions.
- Iwaszko Danilewicz, who served as the governor of the Polotsk head Bohdan Sakowicz between 1477 and 1484, is mentioned among the Polock officials.
- Dr. Jan Ciechanowicz recalls (in volume II of the work entitled Knight Houses of the Grand Duchy of Lithuania) the document concerning the history of the Danilewicz family. The author, referring to the records in the files of the town of Połock, quotes the complaint of Katarzyna Danilewicz, née Starosielska, from July 1667, in which she wrote as follows:

Having come from the Lithuanian countries, from the Muscovite exile in the voivodeship of Połock, to his estates, in the voivodeship of Polotsk lying Chrołcewich y Połciewa, lying in the Vitebsk voivodeship, this year 1667, to the happy recuperators of the castles of Połock and Vitebsk from the hands of Moscow, that when regretting the time of the Moscow Incursion, being expelled from the Ruthenian lands, he differed in various voivodeships and counties in the Grand Duchy of Lithuania, raising his health, living, after a happily concluded peace with the Moscow Tsar, in the Oszmiana district, in Lord Paweł Danilewicz's property, judge of the Vilnius Land, with his spouse, his former Lord Alexander Danilewicz, lived in a manor named Leszney for a considerable time. Where in this year 1667, on March 4th, Lord Danilewicz, having some of his affairs, went to Vilnius, for the March year. There, being haunted by God with a serious bedtime illness, returning from Vilnius, coming to the Murowaney inn, with death from this world, unaware of his wife, he descended. So a journeyman by the name of Stanisław Kopciewich, then traveled to Vilnius with his last Lord Danilewicz, their body, as the dead of Lord Danilewicz on the way to the Murowaney tavern, he brought, and spent the night. Ibid., Through the carelessness of this journeyman, all the things in the sleigh are in the body, stolen.

- The date when the Danilewicz family (Danielewicz) joined the heraldic Clan Ostoja (Moscics) is unknown. This could have happened in the 16th century.

== The estates belonging to the family ==
The most important land properties belonging to the Danilewicz family of the Ostoja coat of arms are listed below.

Nieżyłowy, Teszyłowy, Chrołcewicze, Połciew, Tułowo, Leszna, Nosiłów, Kolendzin, Świrany, Bolniki, Wierzchówka, Zanarocz (alias Koziniec), Wielkie Sioło, Uzła Wielka, Ołseta, Sakowicze, Korciany, Multanka, Średnik, Bohdanówo, Pierzchaiły, Bukaty, Dziertyniki, Poludy, Kozierowce, Rymowicze, Nowosady, Dziesiętniki, Dowkniewicze, Goreckowszczyzna, Hołoblewszczyzna, Jachimowszczyzna, Sulżyn, Sokoleńszczyzna, Lewszany, Gudziany, Piełaniszki, Skierzabola, Szłowin, Kalniszki.

Manor house in Bohdanów

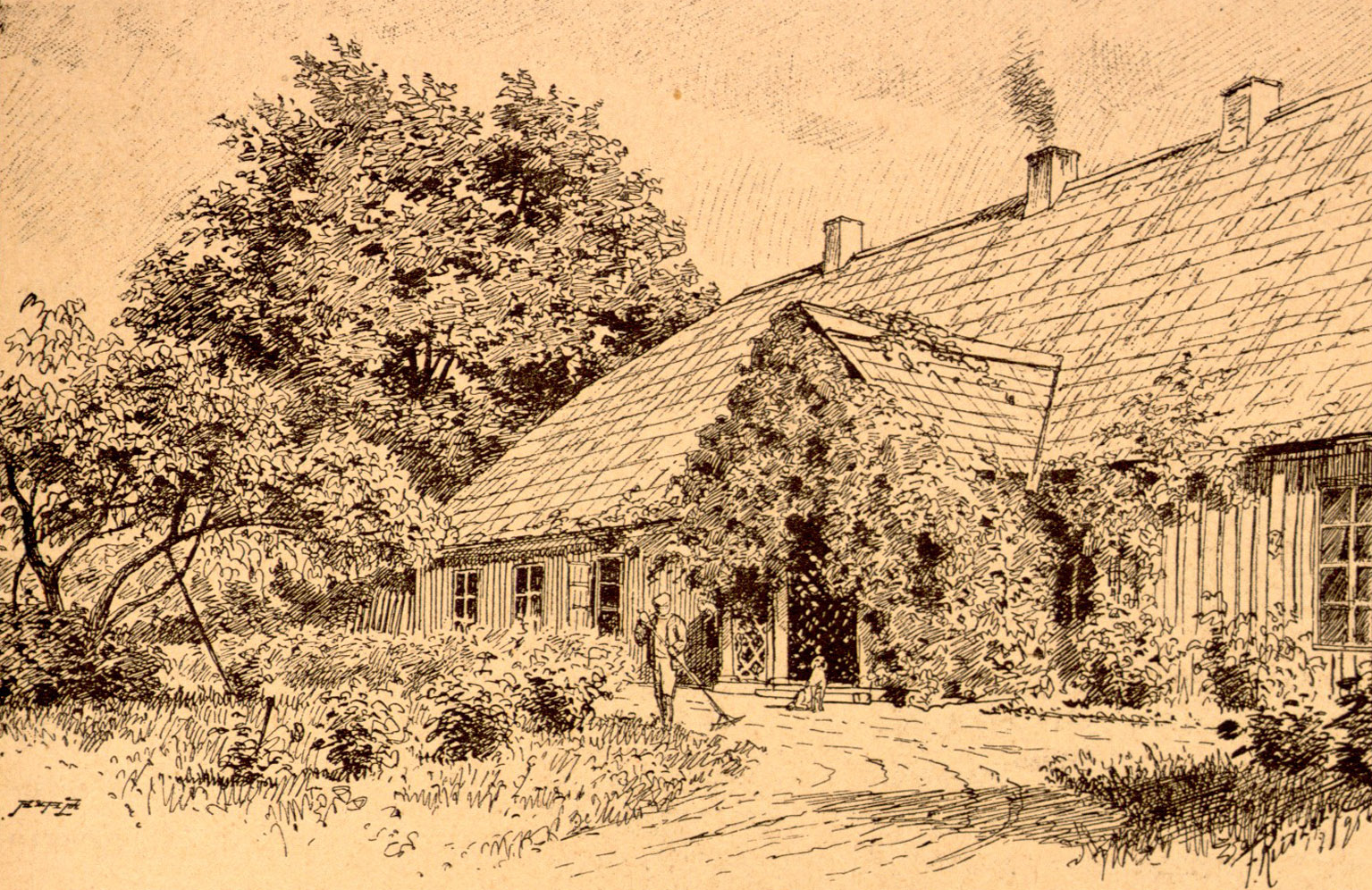
Manor in Bohdanów - drawing Ferdynand Ruszczyc from 1895.

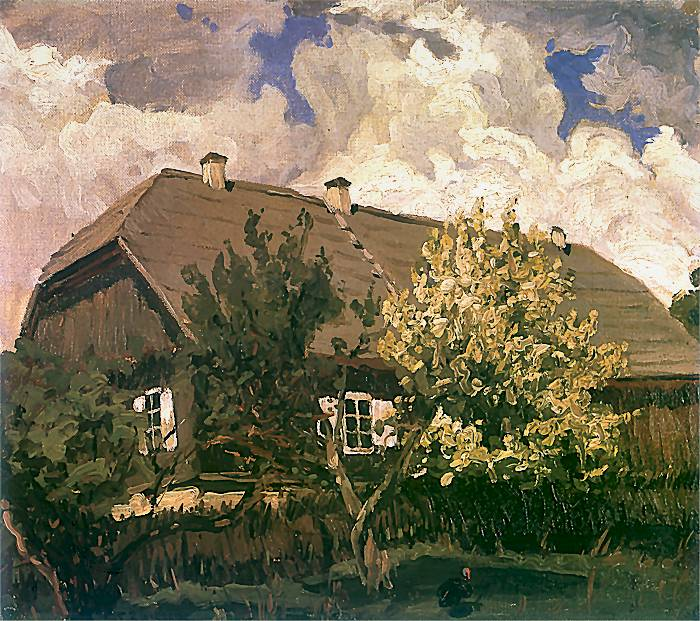
Manor in Bohdanów - painting by Ferdynand Ruszczyc from 1902.

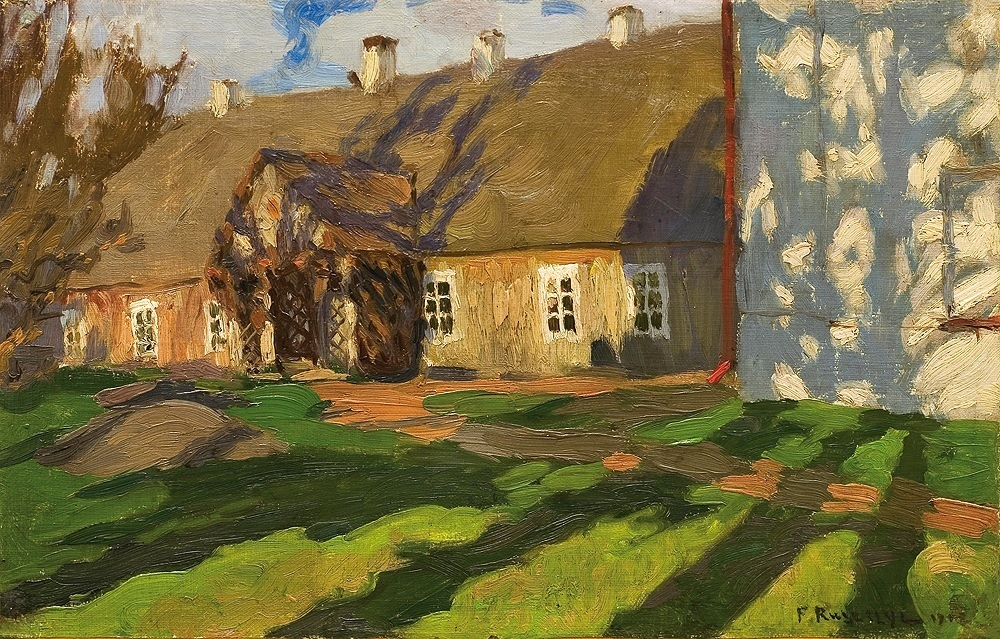
The manor house in Bohdanów from the front - a painting by Ferdynand Ruszczyc from 1902.
The estate of Średnik

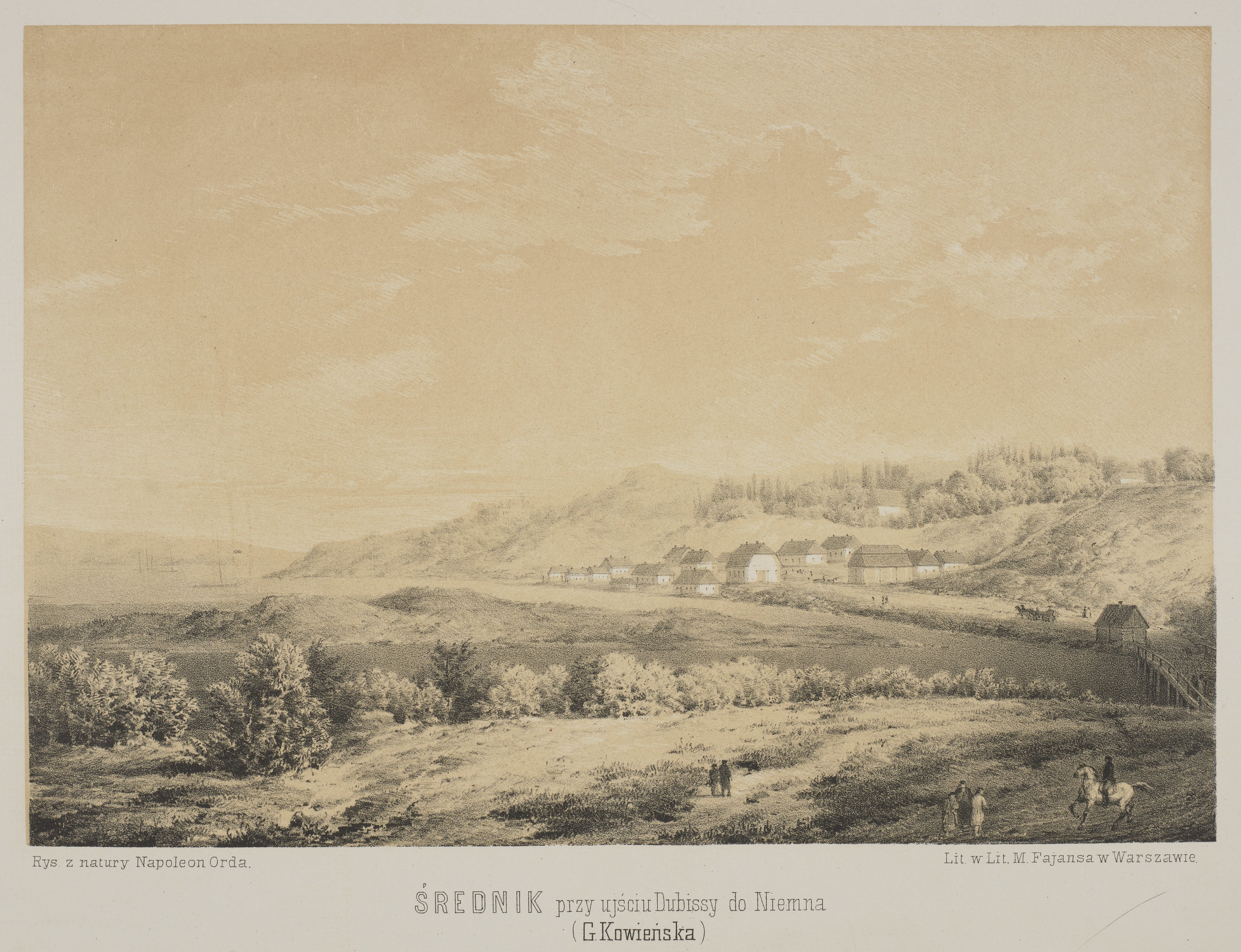
The estate of Średnik, property of the Danilewich family in the first half of 1876. Lithograph from 1876.

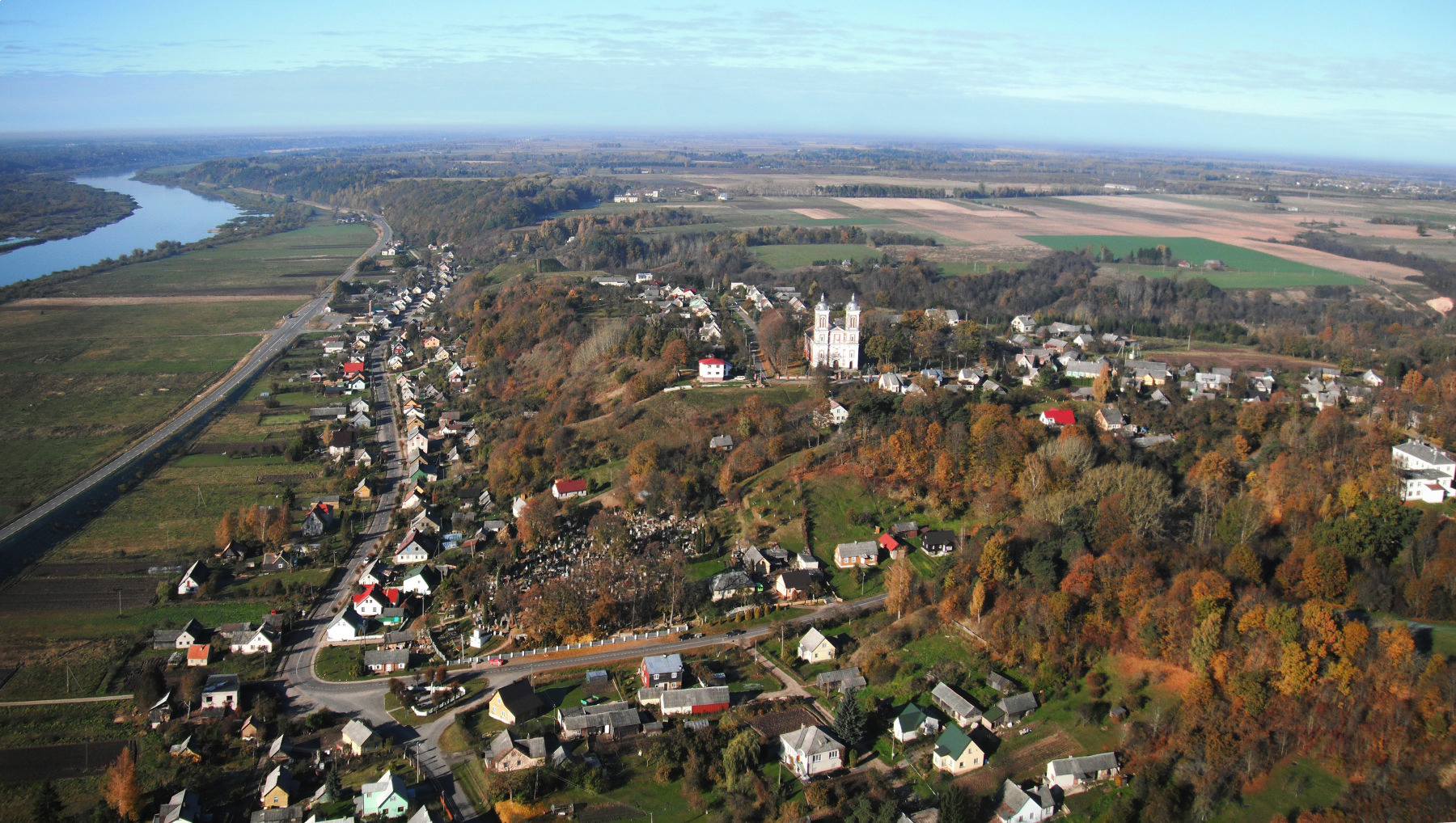
The village of Srednik - photo from 2007.

== Family representatives ==
- Jerzy Danielewicz (1595–1652) – Catholic priest, Jesuit professor of moral theology, prefect of Jesuit schools, confessor of Prince Zygmunt Karol Radziwiłł.
- Paweł Danilewicz (died 1667) – heir of the Leszno estates, Vilnius land judge in 1649–1667, Vilnius deputy in 1646–1649, Lidzki cupbeper in 1642–1646, Vilnius town judge in 1641–1646, the head of Intur, was the elector of Jan II Kazimierz Waza from the Vilnius Province. His spouse was Zofia Duninówna Kitlicka.
- Samuel Danilewicz (died after 1670) – Brasław captain, heir of the Tułowo estate. He handed over these goods to his son Jan in 1670.
- Roman Jan Danilewicz (died 1685) – owner of the Świrany estate, pledged owner of the Korciany estate, chamberlain of Oszmiana, ensign of Oszmiana, of the Oszmiana substitute, head of Intur, member of the Sejm of the First Republic. He was a member of the elective Sejm in 1669 and in 1674. Roman Danilewicz got married twice. His first wife was Zofia Bartoszewska. Through his second marriage, Danilewicz became associated with the Lithuanian magnate Pac family of the Gozdawa coat of arms. In 1670 he married Katarzyna, daughter of Hieronim Dominik Pac (son of Piotr, voivode of Trakai) and Anna Wojnianka.
- Adam Karol Danilewicz (died before 1686) – owner of the Wielkie Sioło estate with the settlements of Mammon and Matyszki, municipal judge in Vilnius. He was the son of Paweł Danilewich, a court judge in Vilnius. His spouse was Leonia Konstancja Hertzdorf.
- Mikołaj Danilewicz (died after 1699) – heir to the estates of Wierzchówek, Ołseta and others, Wilkomier swordfish, Wilkomier's gardener, Wilkomier's deputy, elector of King Michał Korybut Wiśniowiecki.
- Michał Danilewicz (died after 1703) – heir of the estates of Średnik, Bohdanów, Sulżyn and others, the head of Płotele, a parliamentary commissioner in 1703. He was the son of Roman Jan Danilewicz, chamberlain of Oszmiana, staroste of Intura and Katarzyna Pac. His spouse was Eleonora Zenowicz. In 1758, his grandson Jan Danilewicz sold part of Sulżyna (inherited from his father Konstanty).
- Paweł Danilewicz (died after 1706) – Wenden Chamberlain.
- Józef Antoni Danilewicz (died before 1711) – Vendenian chamberlain, Oszmiana equestrian. In 1705 he was nominated for the office of the Oszmiana equestrian after the death of Krzysztof Szymkowicz.
- Michał Danilewicz (died after 1721) – royal landowner of Minsk voivodeship, heir of the Sakowicze estate. These goods (inherited from his uncle Gabriel) he handed over to his son Franciszek in 1721. He was the son of Michał Danilewicz, the head of Płotele.
- Teresa Danilewicz (died 1723) – was the wife of Krzysztof Franciszek Sulistrowski, ensign and lieutenant of Oszmiana, Marshal of the Lithuanian Confederation (1716–1717), who died in 1737. Teresa was the daughter of Roman Danilewicz, chamberlain of Oszmiana, and Katarzyna née Pac.
- Onufry Danilewicz (died before 1741) – captain of the royal army, heir of the Tułowo estate. He was the son of Jan and Łucja née Białonowich.
- Franciszek Stefan Danilewicz (died after 1744) – heir of the Bohdanów, Danilewicze and other estates, the head of Płotele. He was the son of Michał Danilewicz, the governor of Płotel and Eleonora Zenowiczówna. The wife of Franciszek Stefan Danilewicz was Anna Nowkuńska.
- Józef Danilewicz (died after 1750) – heir of the Sokolensk region, treasurer of Kaunas. In 1750 he made a will in which he bequeathed the property to his sons – Kazimierz and Leon, obliging them to pay off their older brothers Tadeusz and Józef.
- Marcin Danilewicz (died after 1750) – Kaunas treasurer, heir of the Sokolensk region. He was the son of Józef Danilewicz.
- Onufry Danilewicz, proper. Kazimierz Aleksander Danilewicz (1695–1753) – Catholic priest, Trinitarian, lecturer (professor) of philosophy and scholastic and dogmatic theology, superior (minister) of the Vilnius monastery in Antakalnis, definitor of the Polish monastic province, ascetic writer, historian and chronicler of his order.
- Franciszek Tadeusz Danilewicz (died after 1766) – ensign of Oszmiana, colonel general of the district of the Oszmiana army of the Grand Duchy of Lithuania. He was the son of Franciszek Stefan Danilewich, the head of Płotele and Anna née Nowkuńska. His wife was Aniela Mirska. In 1764, together with his son Michał, in Vilnius, he signed the act of the confederation of the states of the Grand Duchy of Lithuania.
- Dominik Danilewicz (died after 1773) – a Smolensk hunter, heir of the Tułowo estate. He was the son of Onufry, the captain of the royal army. In 1768, Dominik Danilewicz, together with his sons: Jan, Antoni, Franciszek and Piotr, and his brother Jan, the standard-bearer of the Crown and nephew Michał, sold the property to Tułowo Poces.
- Tadeusz Danilewicz (died after 1788) – heir of the estates of Gudziany, Lewszany, Piełaniszki, Skierzabola, Landwójt of Troki, commissar of provisions in Troki, captain of the Trakai Province. His spouse was Petronela née Sopoćko. In 1777 Gudziany and Lewszany left his sons: Szymon, Captain of Trakai, Wincenty and Józef.
- Michał Danilewicz (died after 1790) – ensign of Pethory, town judge of Smolensk, elector of King Stanisław August. He was the son of Franciszek Tadeusz Danilewicz, the standard-bearer of Oszmiana, and Aniela née Mirska.
- Szymon Danilewicz (died after 1790) - heir of the Gudziana, Lewszany, Piełaniszki estates, Trotsky Captain in 1774. He was the son of Tadeusz, the captain of Trakai. His spouse was Eugenia Randamańska.
- Jozafata Danilewicz (died after 1792) - daughter of Franciszek Tadeusz Danilewicz, the standard-bearer of Oszmiana. She was the wife of Jan Pakosz, a Smolensk judge, a town and land writer from Połack.
- Michał Danilewicz (deceased after 1795) - chamberlain of Zawilów. On April 9, 1793, he swore an oath of faithful submission to the Most Serene Empress, JejM, in the church in Miadziole.
- Julian Danilewicz (died after 1795) - an Oszmiana captain in 1795. He was the son of Antoni. His family settled in the village of Kozłowszczyzna.
- Józef Danilewicz (died after 1804) - captain of the Polish army. In 1804 he sold his part in Lewszany. He was the son of Szymon Danilewicz, captain of Trakai.
- Antoni Danilewicz (died after 1817) - heir of the Lewszany estate, the main guardian of the Trakai Chamber, a river bailiff in 1798. He was the son of Simon, the captain of Trakai. His spouse was Katarzyna Kandratowicz. He sold the estate in Lewszany in 1817.
- Józef Danilewicz (died after 1832) - the owner of the Szłowin estate with the village of Kalniszki, a lieutenant in the Russian army. He was the son of Tadeusz.
- Adolf Danilewicz (died after 1859) - heir of the Szłowin estate with the village of Kalniszki, collegial counselor. He was the son of Józef, a lieutenant in the Russian army. Together with his brothers - Jan and Tadeusz, they were identified as nobility in the Vilnius province in 1819.
- Wincenty Danilewicz (1787–1878) - Napoleonic soldier, cavalryman, participated in the Napoleonic wars, for which he was awarded the French order of the Legion of Honor. He was married to Franciszka Grunwald.
- Waleria Józefa Katarzyna Danilewicz (1828–1881) - daughter of Wincenty and Franciszka Grunwald. Her husband was Rajmund Filip Masłowski, Samson coat of arms, lawyer, head of the Chęciny district during the January Uprising.
- Jan Danilewicz (died 1893) - heir of the Szłowin estate with the village of Kalniszki, titular counselor in the years 1859–1873. He died on January 16, 1893, in Vilnius. He was the son of Józef, a lieutenant in the Russian army. His wife was Eufrozyna née Pizani.
- Teofil Danilewicz (1832–1901) - heir of the Szłowin estate with the village of Kalniszki, colonel. He died on March 2, 1901, in Vilnius, buried in Rusia. He was the son of Józef, a lieutenant in the Russian army.
- Antoni Danielewicz (Danilewicz) (1888-1937 / 8) - murdered by the NKVD for counter-revolutionary activity and agitation for the Polish state (on December 27, 1937, a decision was made to shoot Danilewicz). He was active in Volhynia. He was an opponent of collective farms. According to the NKVD investigative documents, he repeatedly crossed the border between Poland and the USSR. He delivered food and household goods to his family Wróblówka (near Cudnów). His activities were considered contraband by the NKVD. He was the son of Karol Danielewich, a trader, and Feliksa née Bańkowski. His brother Stanisław was exiled to Siberia.
- Zofia Danilewicz-Stysiak (1922–2013) - dentist, prof. dr hab. n. med., director Of the Institute of Dentistry of the Medical Academy in Łódź.

== See also ==
- pl:Danilewiczowie herbu Ostoja (in Polish)
- Ostoja CoA
- Clan Ostoja (Moscics)
- Noble families of Lithuania

== Bibliography ==
- K. Niesiecki, Herbarz polski, wyd. J.N. Bobrowicz, Lipsk 1839–1845, t. III, s. 301.
- A. Boniecki, Herbarz polski, Warszawa 1889–1913, t. IV, s. 80–84.
- A. Boniecki, Poczet rodów w Wielkim Księstwie Litewskim w XV i XVI wieku, Warszawa 1887, s. 42.
- S. Uruski, Rodzina. Herbarz szlachty polskiej, Warszawa 1904–1931, t. III, s. 64.
- W. Kojałowicz, Ks. Wojciecha Wiiuka Kojałowicza herbarz szlachty Wielkiego Księstwa Litewskiego zwany Nomenclator, Kraków 1905, s. 119.
- W. Kojałowicz, F. Piekosiński, Ks. Wojciecha Wijuka Kojałowicza S. J. Herbarz rycerstwa W. X. Litewskiego tak zwany Compendium czyli o klejnotach albo herbach których familie stanu rycerskiego w prowincyach Wielkiego Xięstwa Litewskiego zażywają, Kraków 1897, s. 205.
- J. Ciechanowicz, Rody rycerskie Wielkiego Księstwa Litewskiego, Rzeszów 2001, t. II, s. 301.
- O. Chorowiec, Herbarz szlachty wołyńskiej, t. VII, Radom 2018, s. 101–109.
- Я.С. Глінскі, Гербоўнік беларускай шляхты, t. V (Д), Мінск 2018, c. 162–164.
- G. Błaszczyk, Herbarz szlachty żmudzkiej, wyd: DiG, Warszawa 2015, t. I, s. 401–409.
- Słownik geograficzny Królestwa Polskiego i innych krajów słowiańskich.
- C. Jankowski, Powiat Oszmanski, cz. I, s. 223–233.
- Urzędnicy Wielkiego Księstwa Litewskiego Spisy. Tom I. Województwo wileńskie XIV-XVIII wiek, A. Rachuba (red.), H. Lulewicz, A. Rachuba, P. P. Romaniuk (oprac.), Warszawa 2004, s. 153, 168–169, 172, 213–214, 228, 264, 272, 319, 433–434, 462, 464, 611, 641.
- Urzędnicy Wielkiego Księstwa Litewskiego Spisy. Tom IV. Ziemia smoleńska i województwo smoleńskie XIV-XVIII wiek, A. Rachuba (red.), H. Lulewicz, A. Rachuba, P. P. Romaniuk (oprac.), Warszawa 2003, s. 102, 163, 315, 349.
- Urzędnicy Wielkiego Księstwa Litewskiego Spisy. Tom V. Ziemia połocka i województwo połockie XIV-XVIII wiek, H. Lulewicz (red.), H. Lulewicz, A. Rachuba, A. Haratym, A. Macuk, A. Radaman (oprac.), Warszawa 2018, s. 149, 179, 265.
- Metryka Litewska. Księga wpisów nr 131, A. Rachuba (oprac.), Warszawa 2001, nr 1018, s. 439.
- Metryka Litewska. Rejestry podymnego Wielkiego Księstwa Litewskiego. Województwo wileńskie 1690 r., A. Rachuba (oprac.), Warszawa 1989, s. 111, 122, 127, 166, 250.
- Encyklopedia wiedzy o jezuitach na ziemiach Polski i Litwy 1564–1995, L. Grzebień SJ (oprac.), Kraków 1996, hasło: DANIELEWICZ.
- Encyklopedia katolicka, (red. R. Łukaszyk, L. Bieńkowski, F. Gryglewicz), t. III, Lublin, KUL, 1979, hasło: DANILEWICZ Aleksander Kazimierz, k. 1014.
- C. Malewski, Rodziny szlacheckie na Litwie w XIX wieku. Powiaty lidzki, oszmiański i wileński, Warszawa 2016, s. 62, 256, 457.
- O. Pietruski, Elektorów poczet, którzy niegdyś głosowali na elektorów Jana Kazimierza roku 1648, Jana III roku 1674, Augusta II roku 1697, i Stanisława Augusta roku 1764, najjaśniejszych Królów Polskich, Wielkich Książąt Litewskich, i.t.d. Ułożył i wydał Oswald Zaprzaniec z Siemuszowej Pietruski, Lwów 1845, s. 65.
- J. Dunin-Borkowski, M. Dunin-Wąsowicz, Elektorowie królów Władysława IV., Michała Korybuta, Stanisława Leszczyńskiego i spis stronników Augusta III. Zestawili w porządek abecadłowy Jerzy Dunin-Borkowski i Miecz. Dunin-Wąsowicz., Rocznik Towarzystwa Heraldycznego we Lwowie (red. Władysława Semkowicza), t. I, s. 38.
- L. A. Wierzbicki, Posłowie Wielkiego Księstwa Litewskiego na zjazd warszawski i sejm pacyfikacyjny 1673 roku, „Teka Komisji Historycznej", PAN, Lublin 2004, vol. I, s. 98.
