= Wincenty Danilewicz =

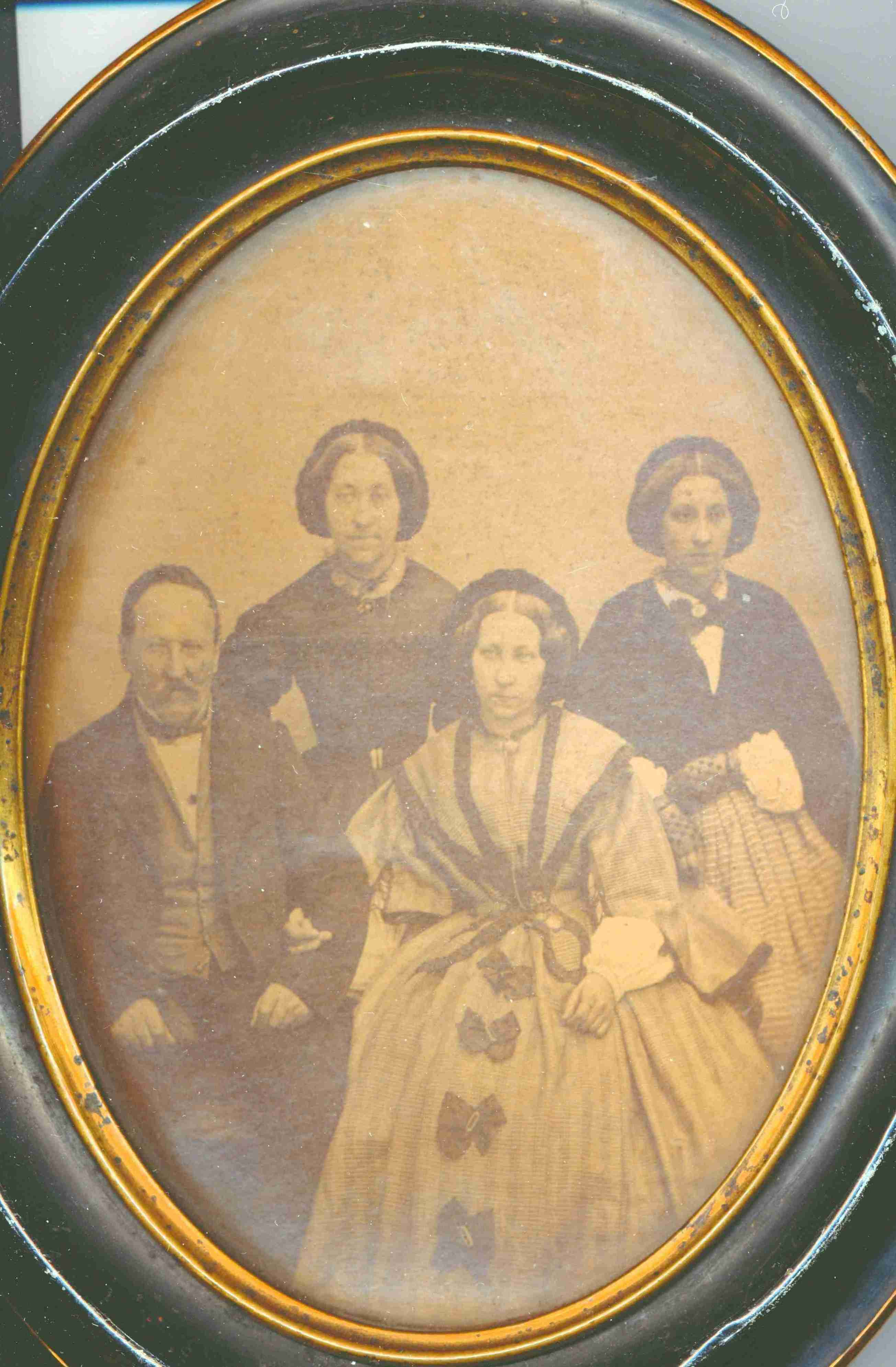
- Wincenty Danilewicz and his daughters in c. 1850 (Waleria Danilewicz – sitting, Aneta and Julia – standing behind)
- Born: 1787; Minsk, Polish–Lithuanian Commonwealth
- Died: 23 March 1878 (aged 90–91) Jędrzejów, Russian Empire
- Allegiance: Poland–Lithuania; France; Duchy of Warsaw
- Awards: French Legion of Honour, 1814
- Spouse: Franciszka Grunwald (c. 1797-1842)
- Other work: secretary of Chancellery of Senat in Congress Poland, chief archivist of heraldric administration of Congress Poland in Warsaw

Wincenty Danilewicz (1787 – 23 March 1878) was a Chevau-léger in the Napoleonic campaign, secretary of Chancellery of Senat in Congress Poland, chief archivist of heraldric administration of Congress Poland in Warsaw.

== Biography ==
Ostoja coat of arms

Wincenty Danilewicz was born in 1787 in Minsk, Polish–Lithuanian Commonwealth. He was a member of the Ostoja Danielewicz family and served as a Chevau-léger in the Napoleonic campaign, for which he was awarded the French Order of Legion of Honour and Saint Helena Medal. He took part (among others) in The Battle of Arcis-sur-Aube (20–21 March 1814), where he was wounded.

In 1815 he returned home, and started to work as a secretary of Chancellery of Senat in Congress Poland. Then he worked in the archive of heraldry administration of Congress Poland in Warsaw. He retired in 1844.

Later in his life, Wincenty Danilewicz moved to Jędrzejów. Afterwards he ran the literary production i.e.: three tragedies and the opera buffa. His great-grandson Maciej Masłowski wrote (1957), that in Wincenty testament (1859) thirty volumes of his memoirs were also mentioned.

Wincenty was married to Franciszka (born Grunwald, c. 1797/1798 – 4 January 1842) and they had a daughter, Waleria Józefa Katarzyna (1827-1881) who married Rajmund Masłowski (lawyer). Together, they had a son Stanisław Masłowski, outstanding Polish painter. Masłowski family belonged to Clan Samson that used Samson Coat of Arms. He died 23 March 1878 (aged 90)

He died on 23 March 1878 in Jędrzejów, Russian Empire.

== Gallery ==
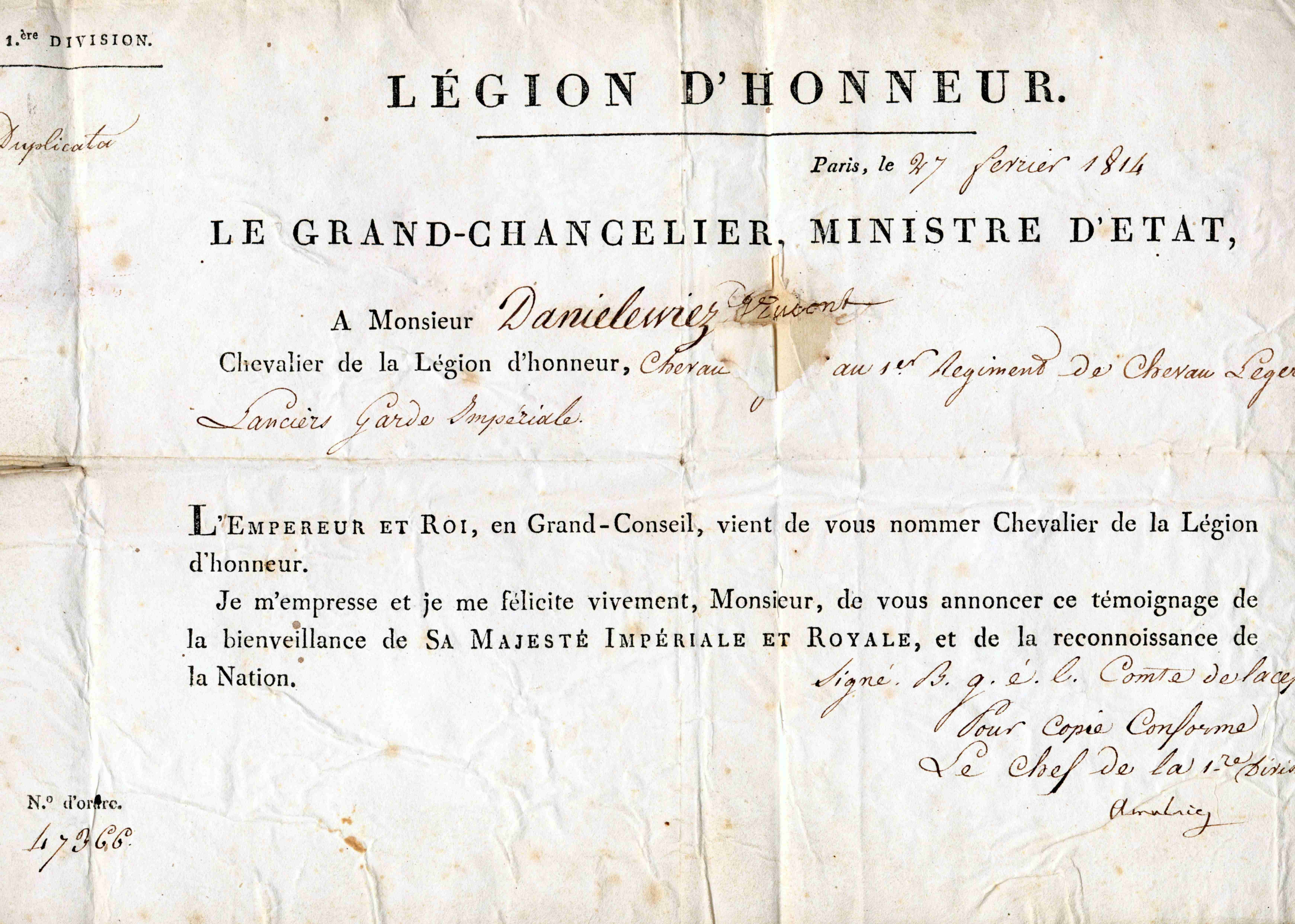
Wincenty Danilewicz Legion of Honour Certificate, 1814

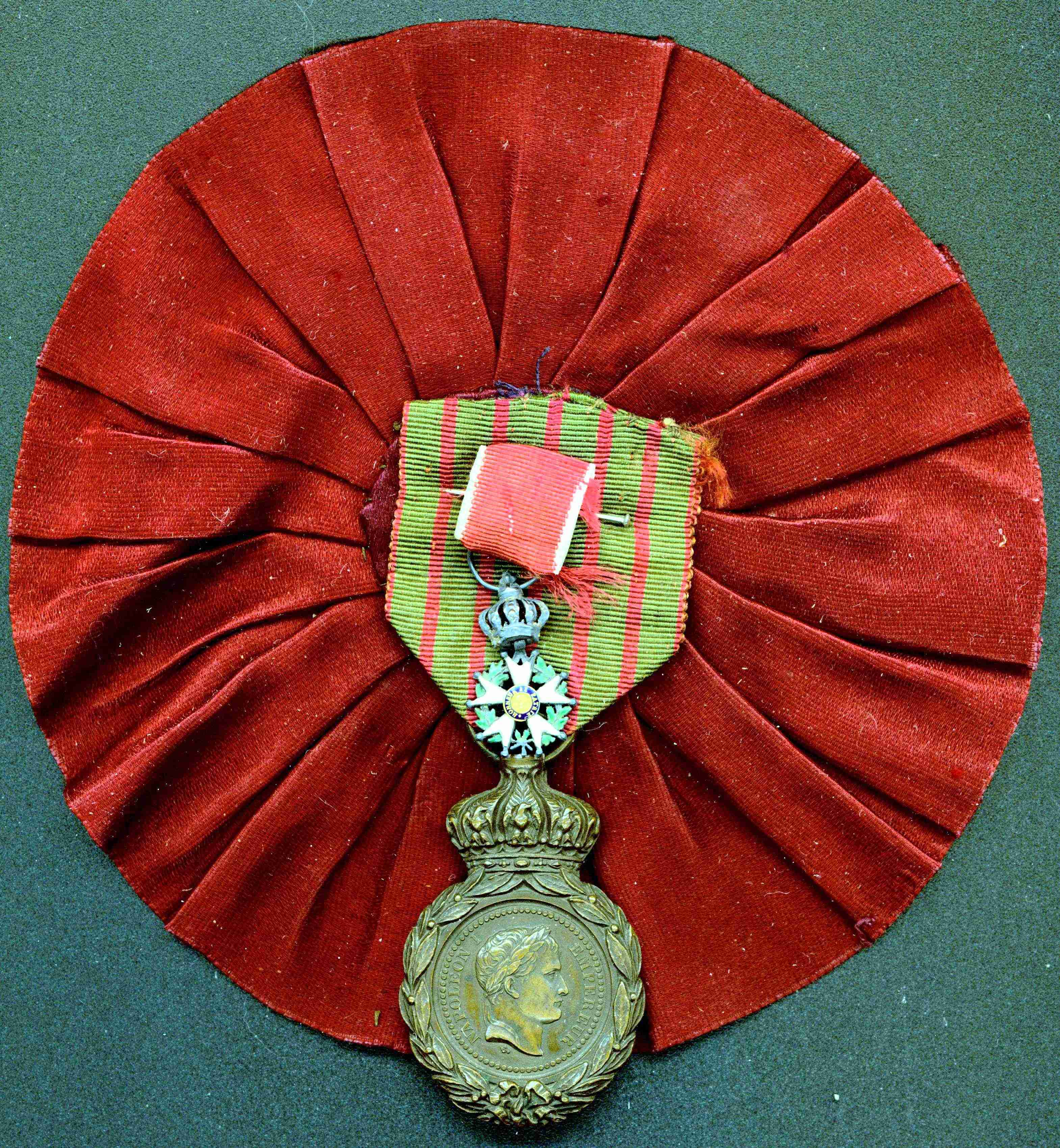
Wincenty Danilewicz French Order of Legion of Honour, 1814

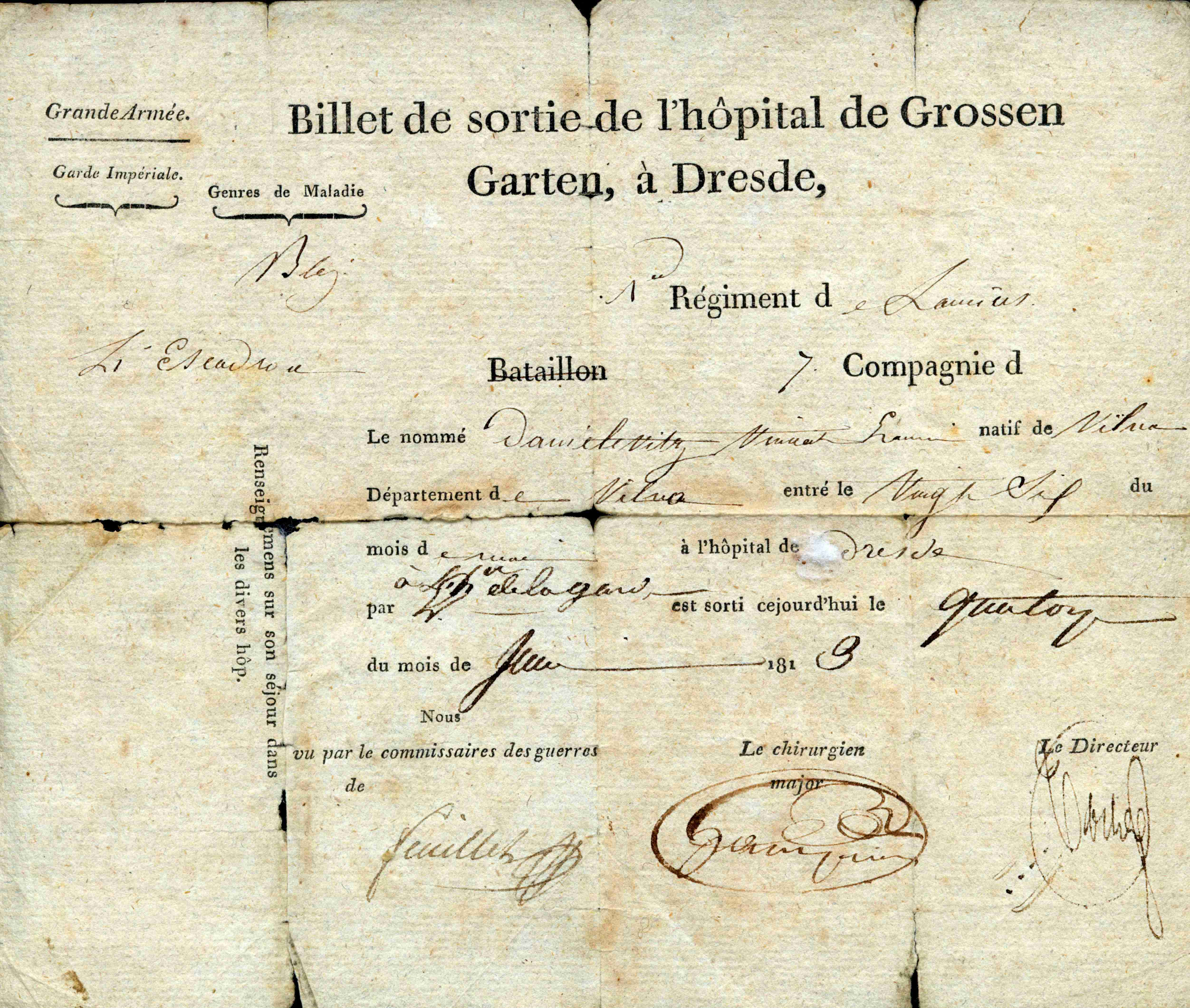
Wincenty Danilewicz Dresden hospital testimonial, 1813

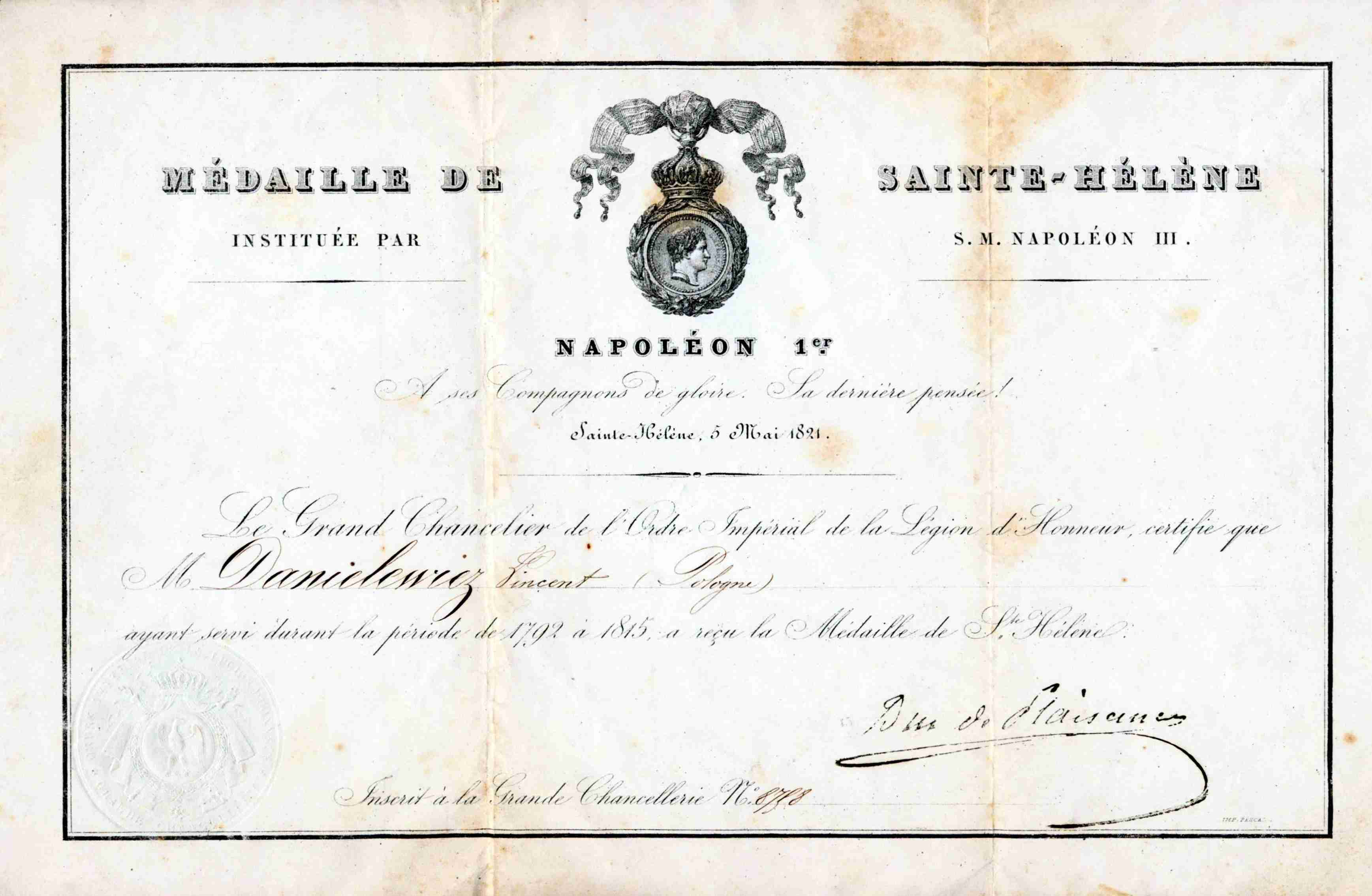
Wincenty Danilewicz Saint Helena Medal Certificate

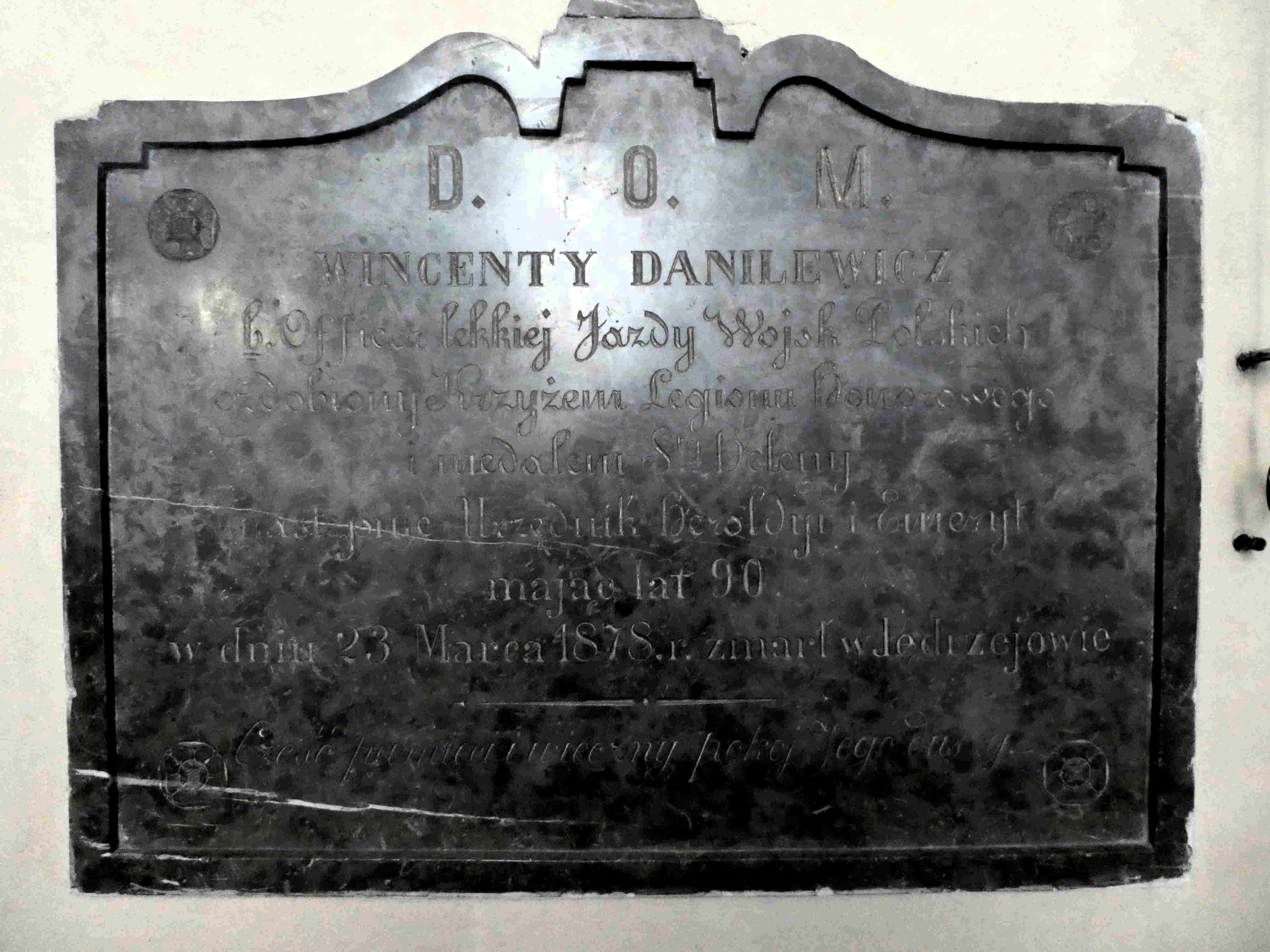
Wincenty Danilewicz Epitaph at Holy Trinity Church in Jędrzejów, Poland, 1878

== Bibliography ==
- Bielecki R.: Szwoleżerowie gwardii, seria: „Słynne Pułki Polskie” (series: "Famous Polish Regiments", Ed. "Neriton" Publishers, Warsaw 1996 (in Polish);
- Łoza S.: Legia honorowa w Polsce 1803–1923 (French Order of Legion of Honour in Poland 1803–1923), Zamość 1923, ed. Zygmunt Pomarański i Spółka (reprint Warsaw 1986, ed. Wydawnictwa Artystyczne i Filmowe – WAiF (in Polish);
- Masłowski M. [coll.]: Stanisław Masłowski – Materiały do życiorysu i twórczości (Stanisław Masłowski – Materials for the biography and works), Wrocław 1957, ed. "Ossolineum" – Polish Academy of Sciences (in Polish).
