= Ferdynand Ruszczyc =

Polish painter, printmaker, and stage designer (1870–1936)

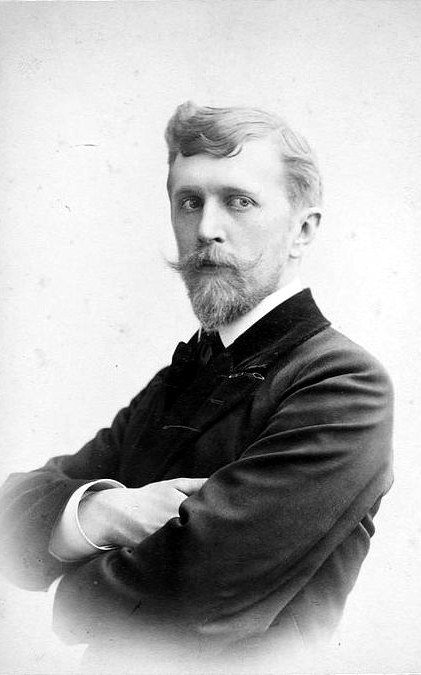
Ferdynand Ruszczyc by Jadwiga Golcz, 1902, National Museum, Warsaw

Ferdynand Ruszczyc (1870–1936) was a Polish painter, printmaker, and stage designer. He was a member of the aristocratic Ruszczyc de Lis family.

== Biography ==
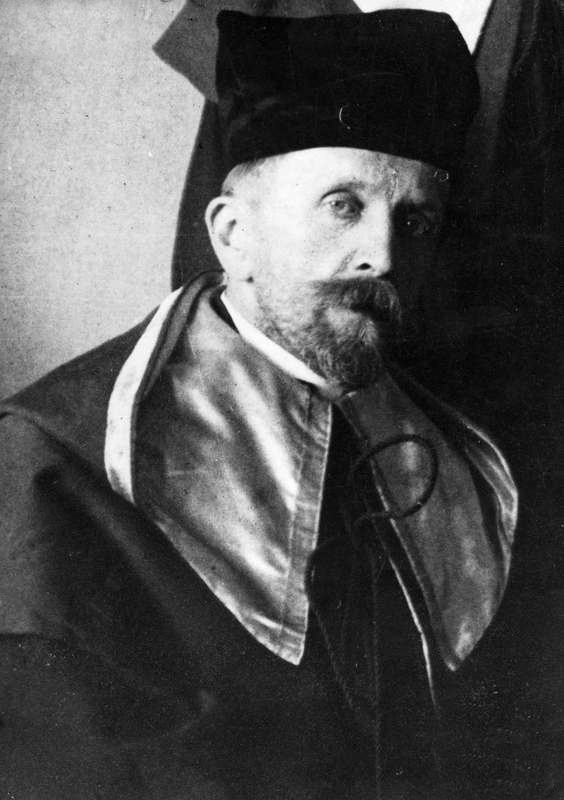
Ruszczyc in 1936

Born in the village of Bohdanów (then Russian Empire, now Belarus), Ruszczyc spent his childhood in Minsk. He graduated from gymnasium in Minsk in 1890 with a gold medal. Ruszczyc originally studied law at the University of St. Petersburg, but later switched majors and began taking painting classes at the Imperial Academy of Arts. He was a student of the famous Russian landscape painters Ivan Shishkin and Arkhip Kuindzhi. Ruszczyc travelled to the Crimea to paint seascapes, and later to the Baltic islands and Sweden to paint northern landscapes. He visited Berlin, where he was significantly influenced by the Symbolist painters such as Arnold Bocklin. After graduation, Ruszczyc made extensive tours of Western Europe incorporating much of the styles he came across into his own art.

== Career ==
Together with Kazimierz Stabrowski, Xawery Dunikowski, Konrad Krzyżanowski and Karol Tichy, Ruszczyc helped develop the Warsaw School of Fine Arts, where he taught for a while. One of his students was the famous Lithuanian symbolism painter M. K. Čiurlionis. In 1907–08 he held the chair of landscape painting at the Kraków Academy of Fine Arts.

In 1908, with Józef Mehoffer, Ruszczyc organized an exhibition of Polish painting in Vienna. He then settled in Vilna (Vilnius), where he devoted himself to teaching. One of his students of that time was famous Russian and Soviet sculptor Isaac Itkind. Ruszczyc also organized cultural events, and worked as a graphic designer, poster designer and illustrator. As a costume designer, he participated in several performances of the municipal theater, and he was a member of the "Committee for the Conservation of the Adam Mickiewicz Monument". In 1918 and 1919 he participated in the founding of the Faculty of Fine Arts at Stefan Batory University, where he was elected as the first dean. Czeslaw Znamierowski was one of his most notable students there.

== Selected paintings ==
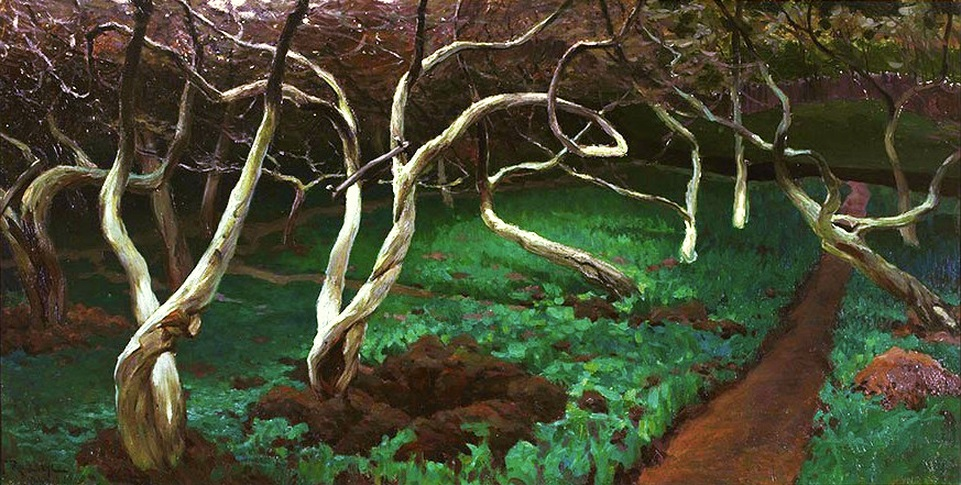
Old Apple Trees

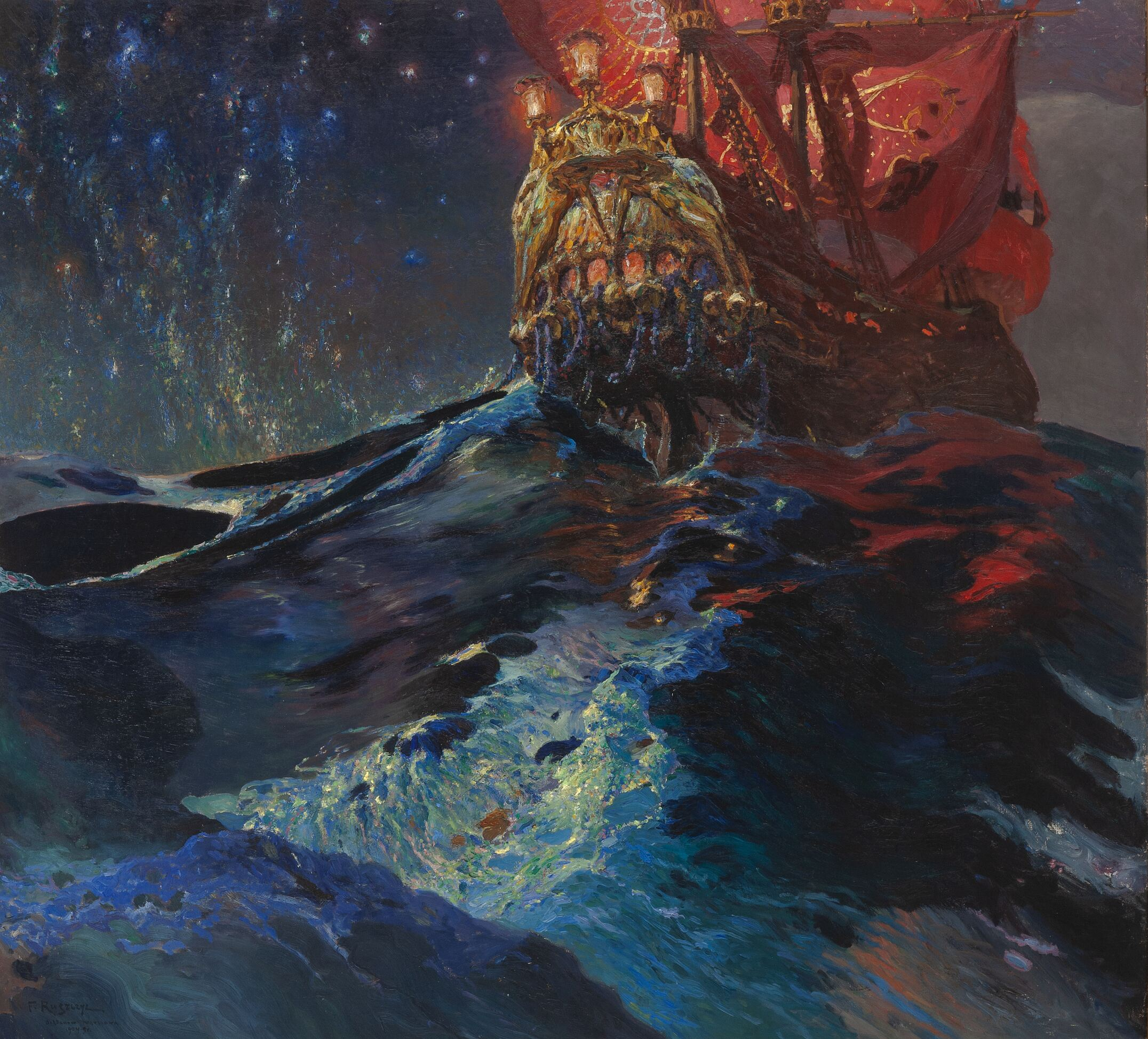
"Nec Mergitur"
(It will not sink)

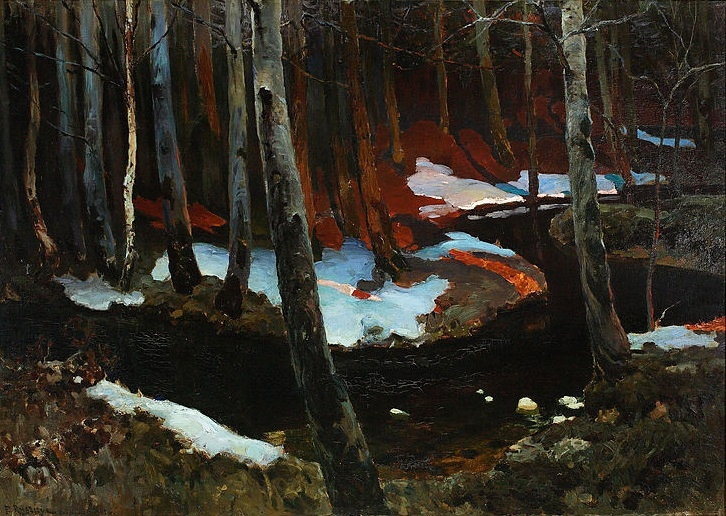
Forest Brook

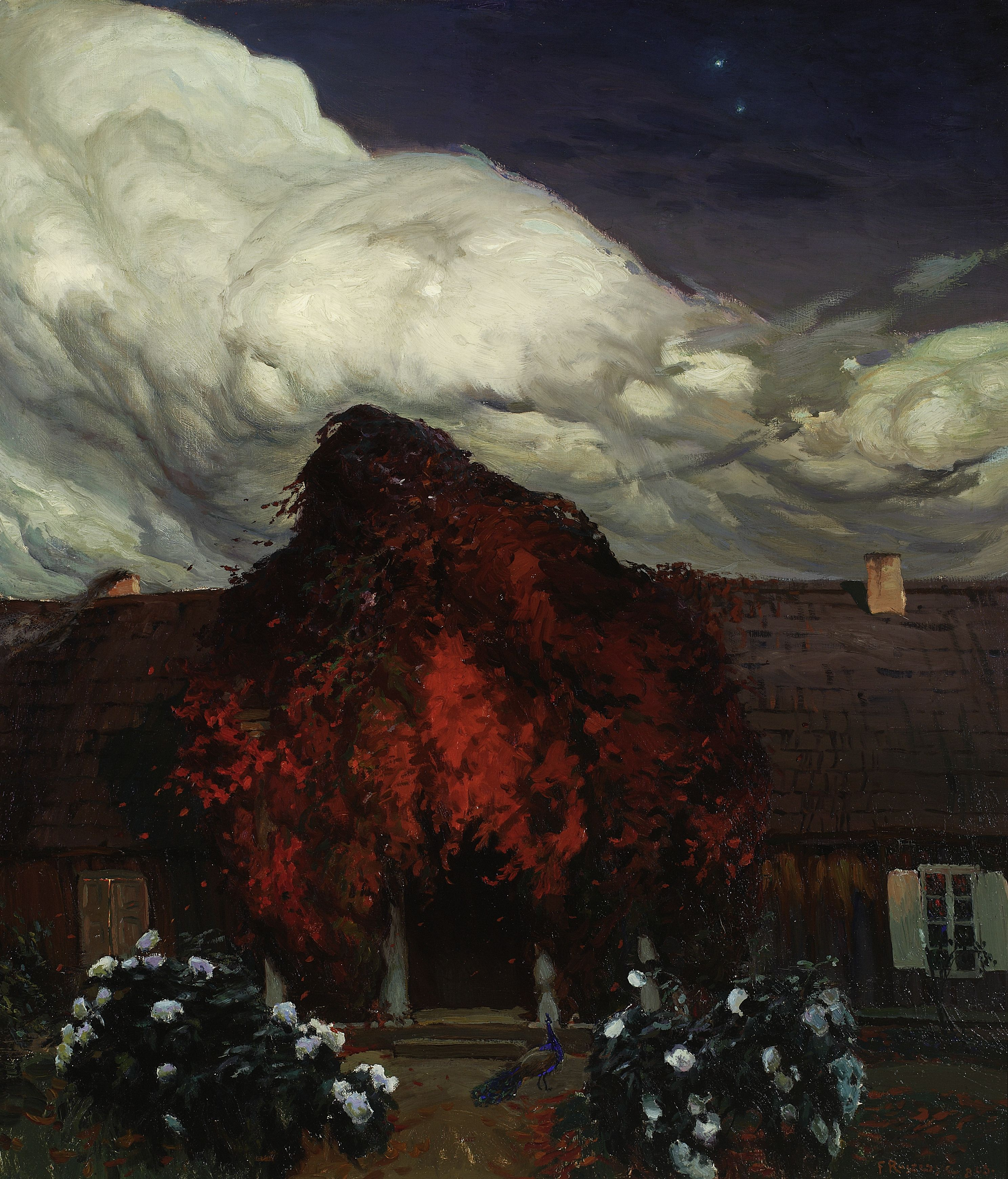
Old House

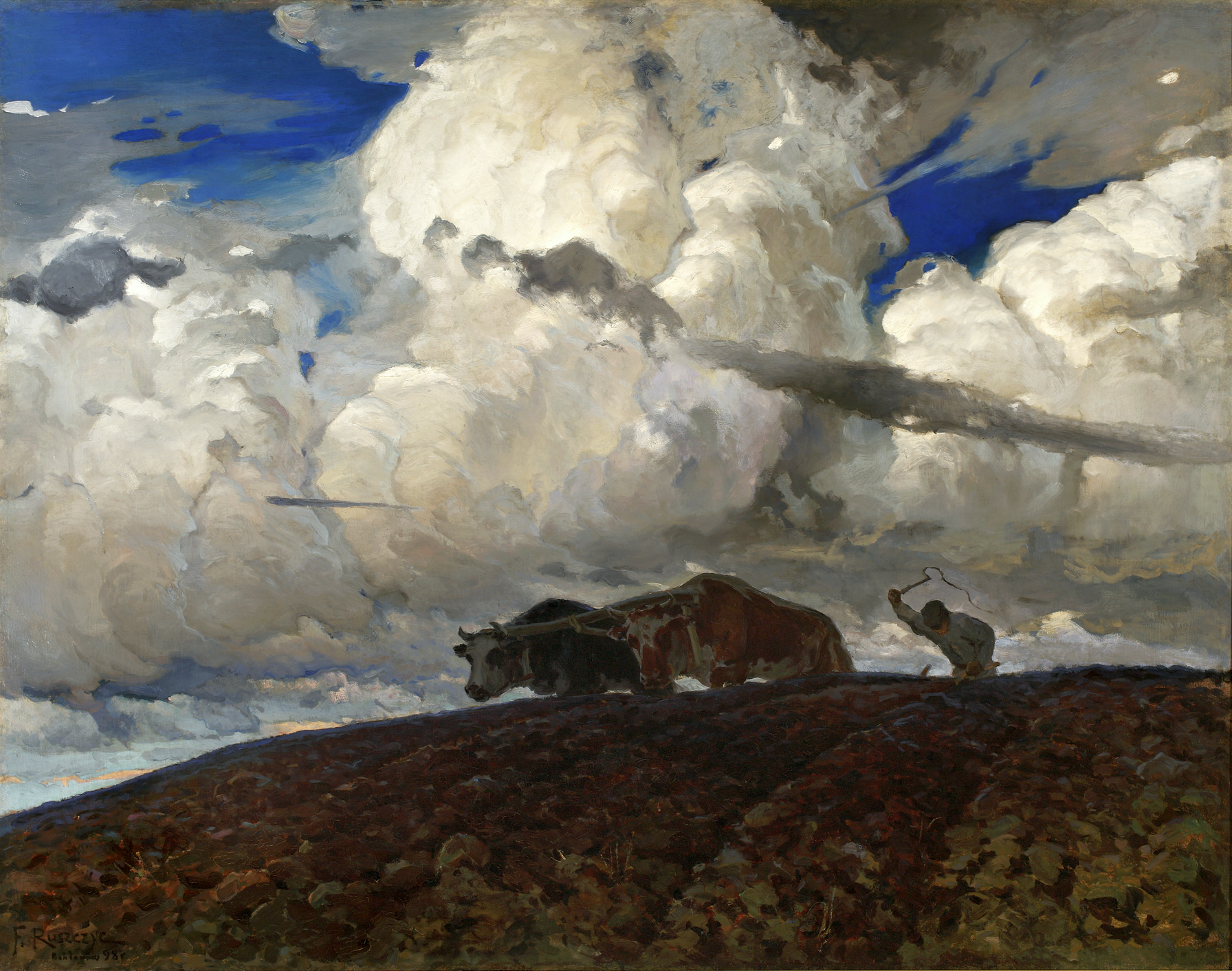
Soil

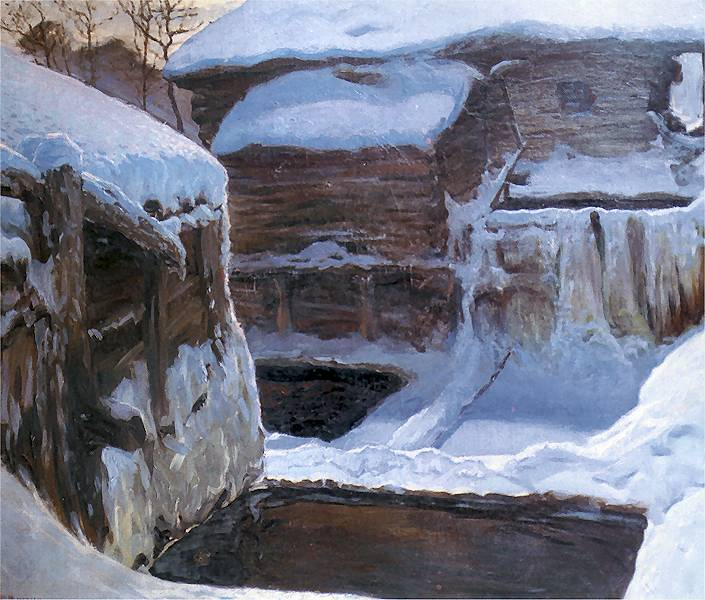
Winter Landscape

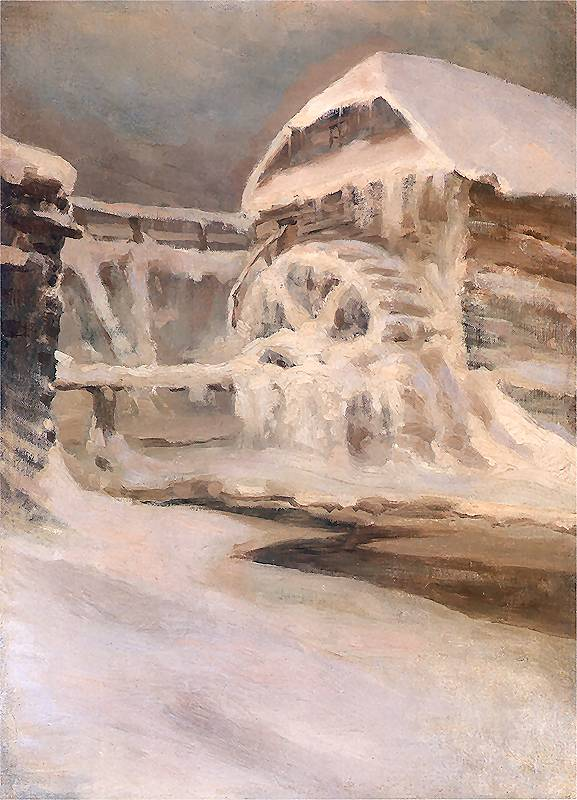
Mill in Winter

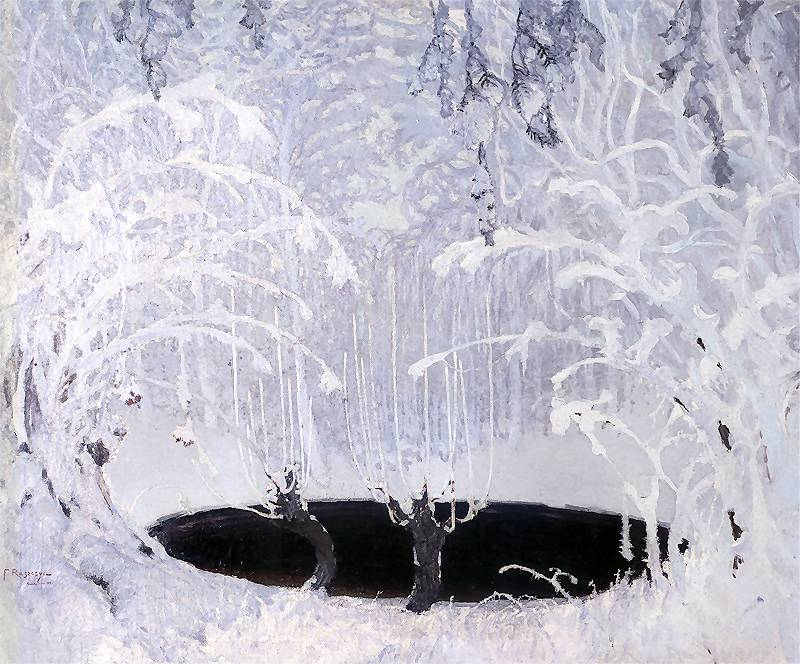
Winter Landscape

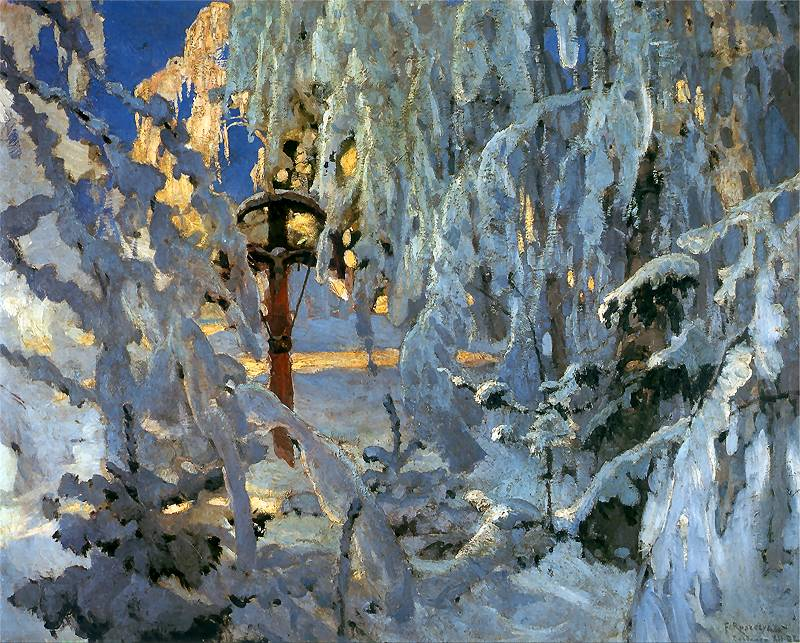
Winter Landscape

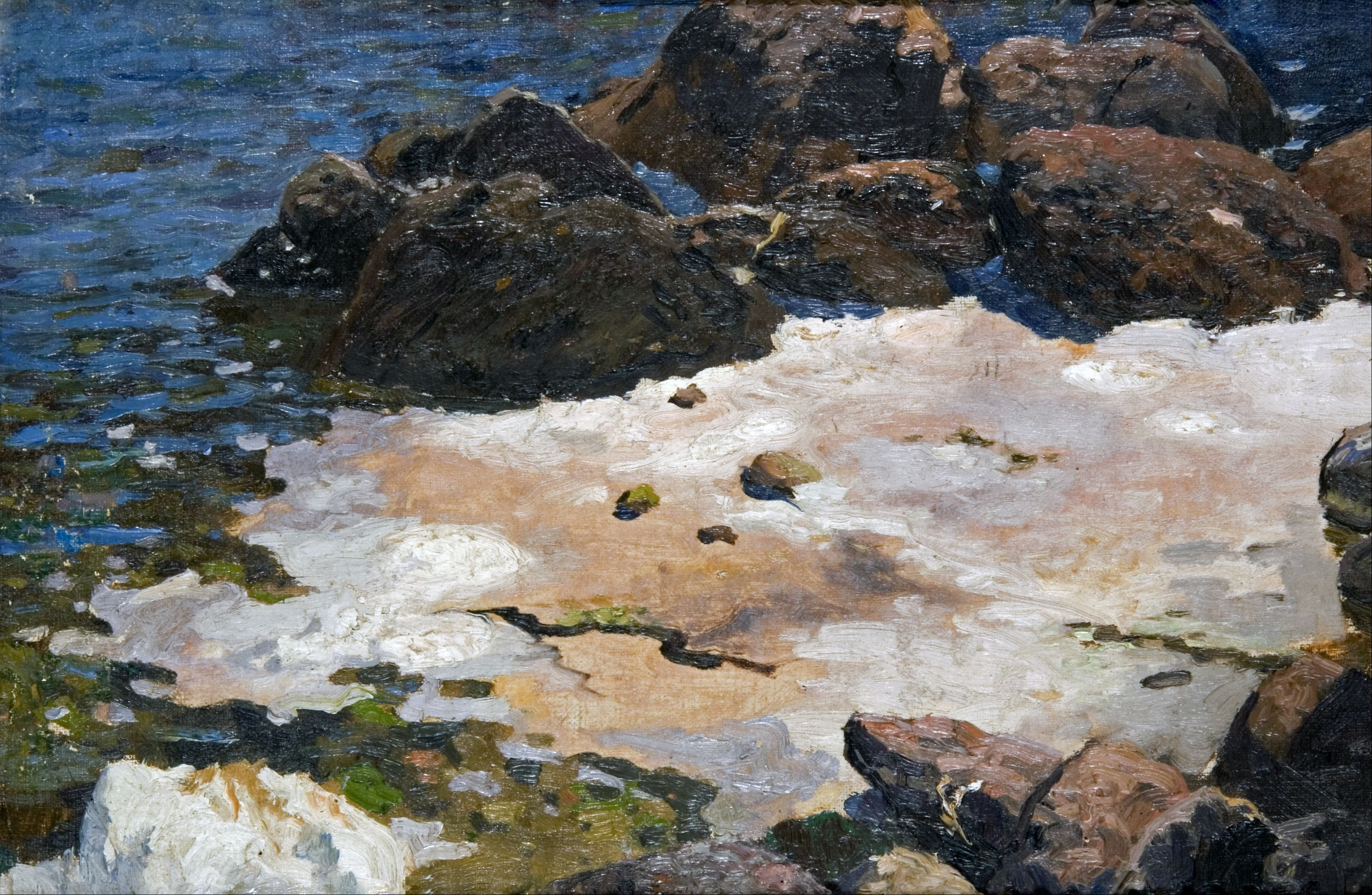
Coast of Crimea

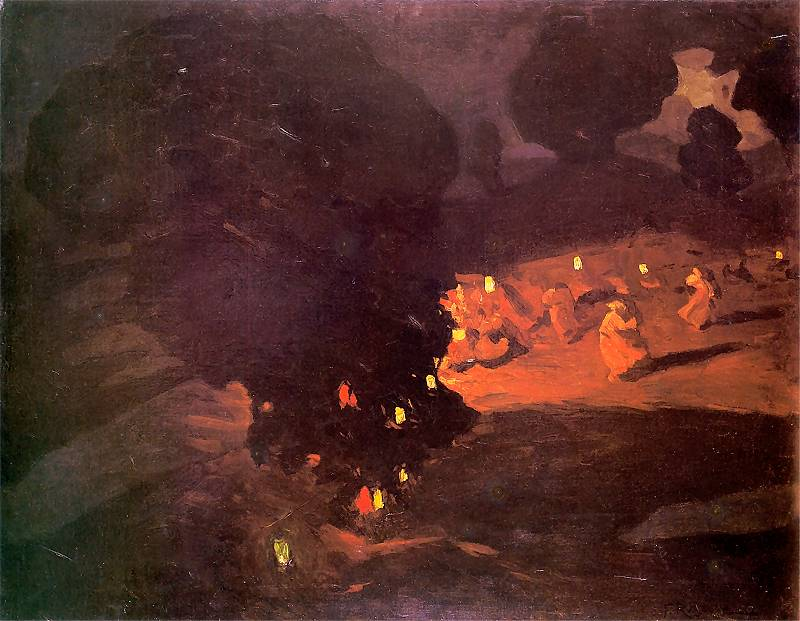
Saturday

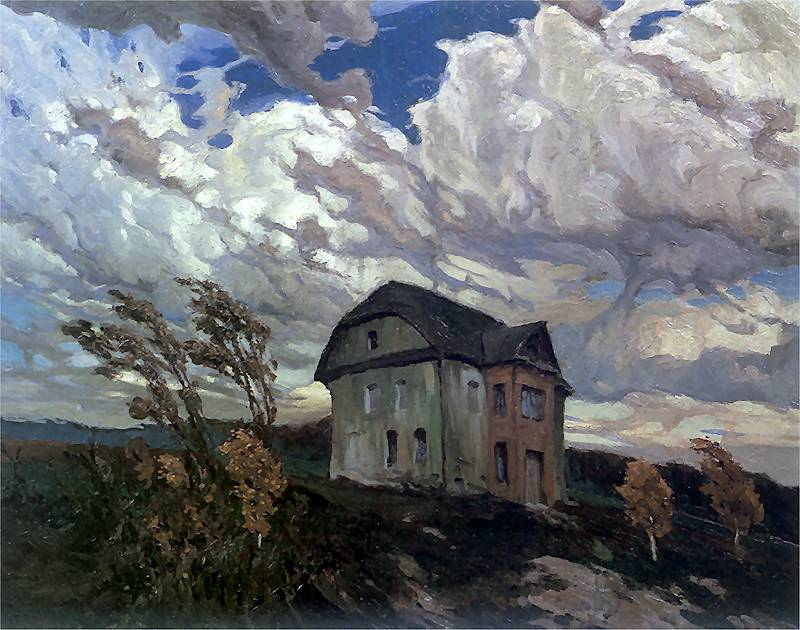
Emptiness

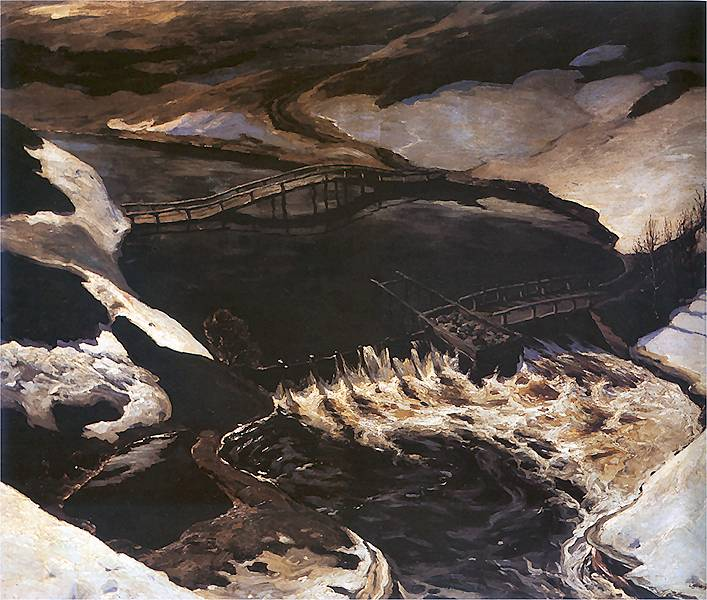
On the Banks of the Wilejka

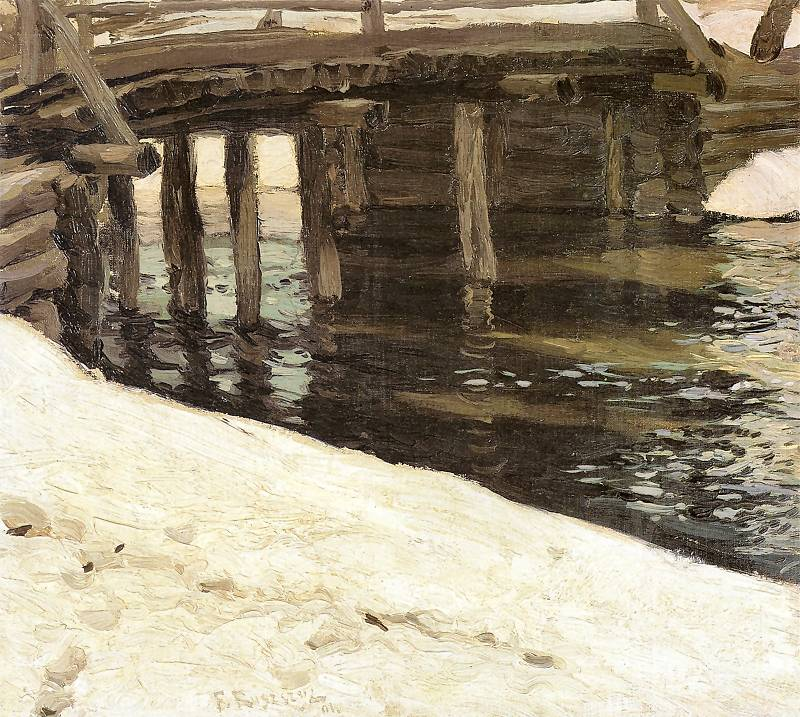
Winter Landscape

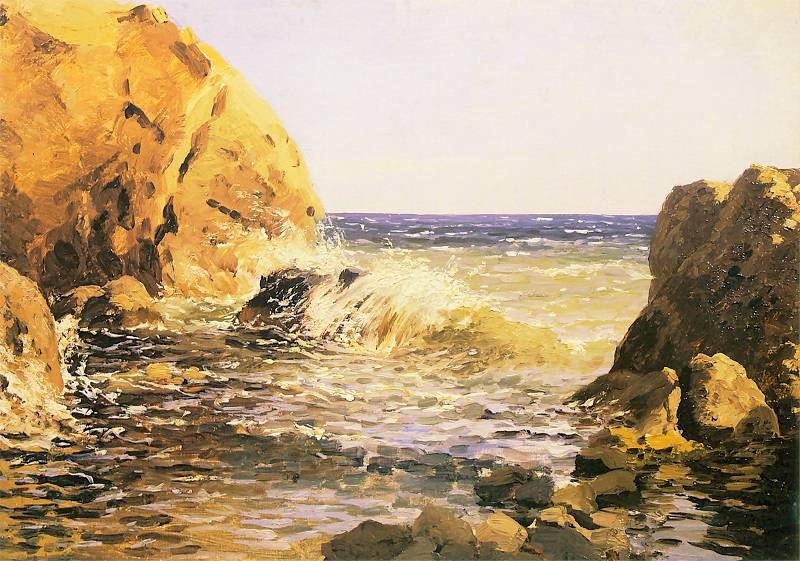
Sea and Rocks

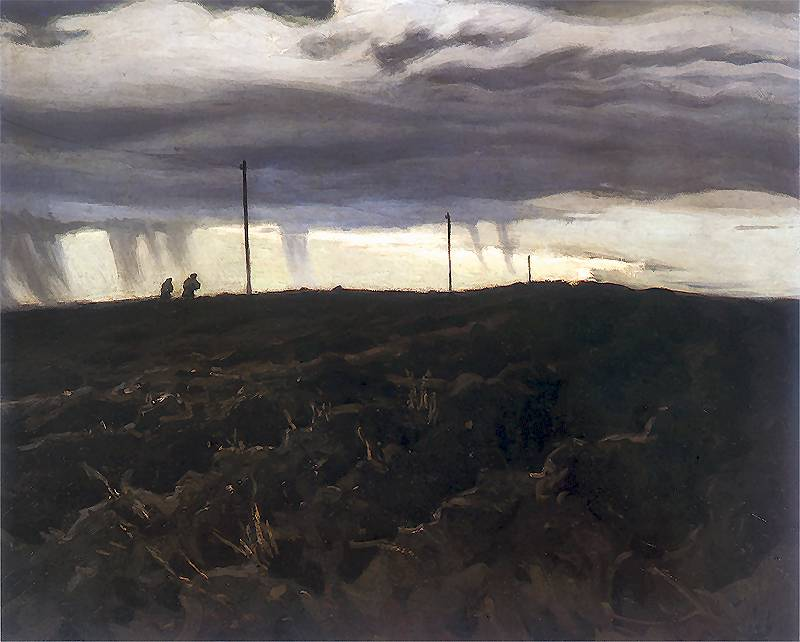
Into the World

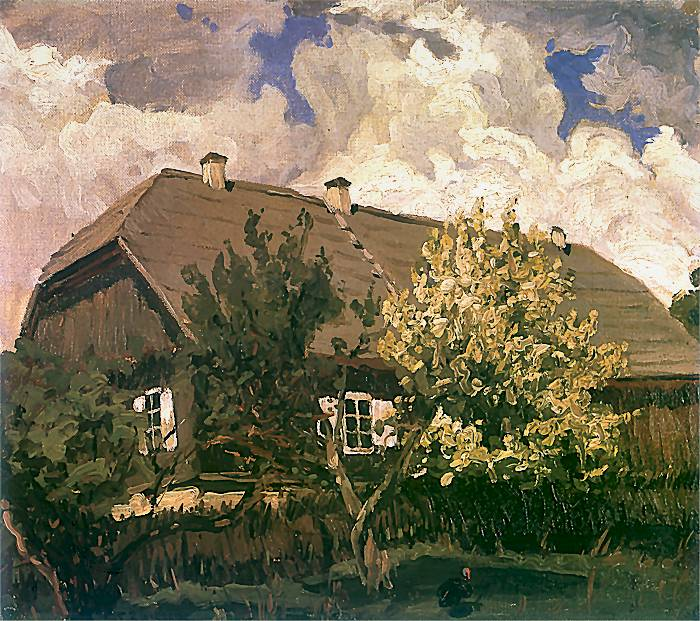
House in Bohdanow

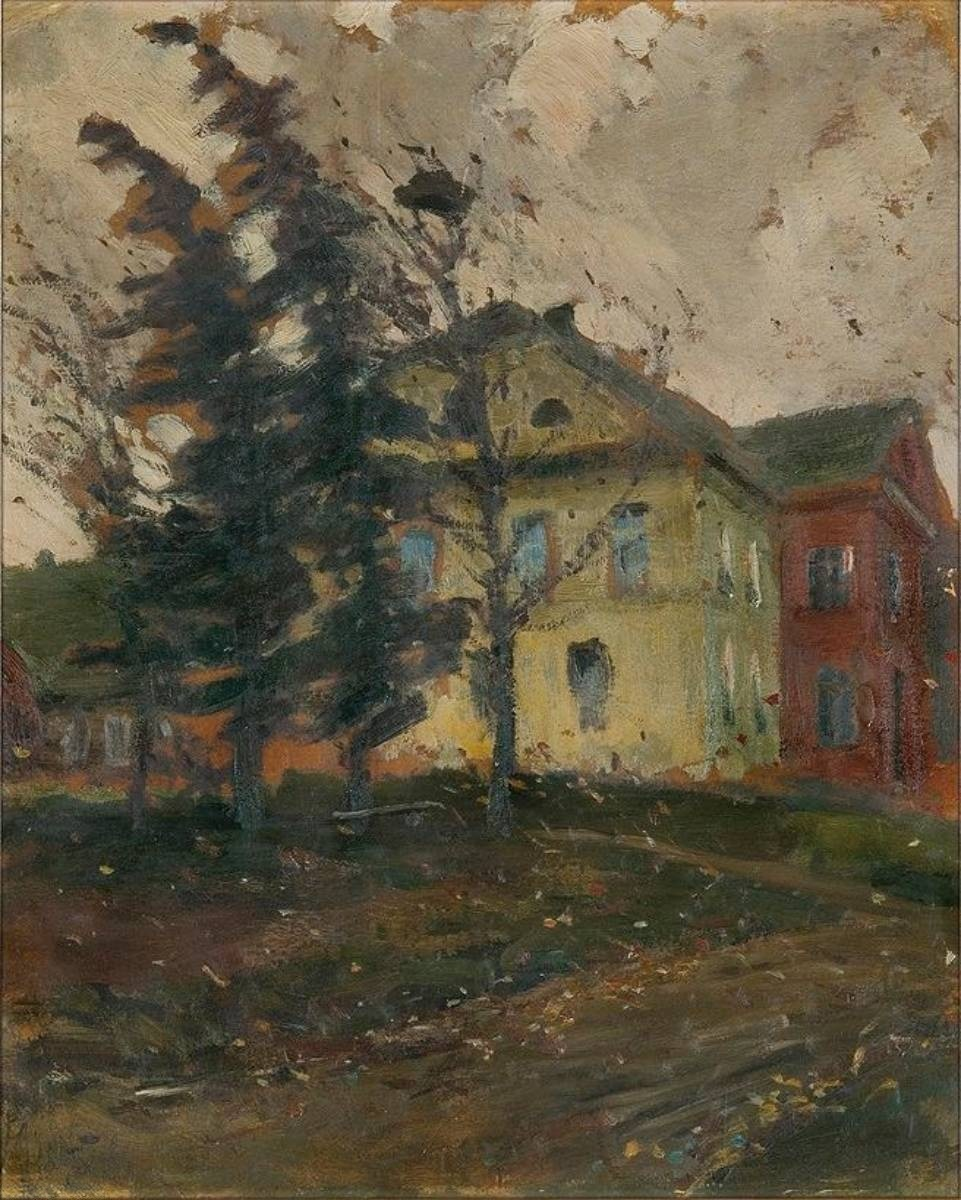
The Old Nest
