= Zygmunt Karol Radziwiłł =

Polish–Lithuanian nobleman (1591–1642)

Zygmunt Władysław Radziwiłł
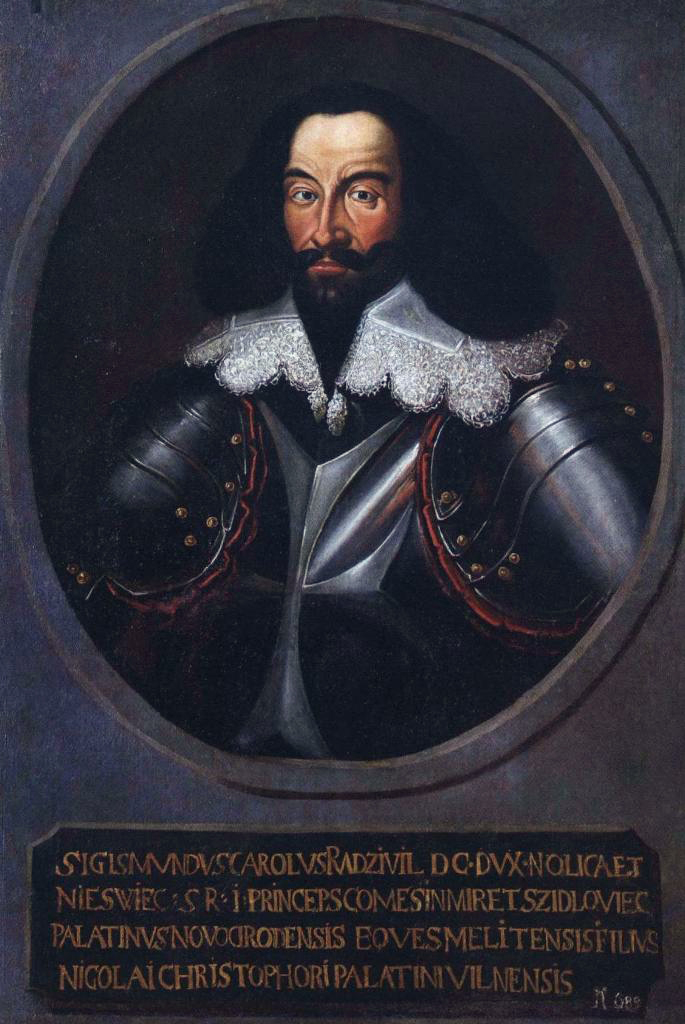
- Born: 4 December 1591; Nesvizh, Polish–Lithuanian Commonwealth
- Died: 5 November 1642 (aged 50); Assisi, Italy
- Parent(s): Mikołaj Krzysztof Radziwiłł; Elzbieta "Halaszka" Eufemia Wiśniowiecka

Zygmunt Karol Radziwiłł (Lithuanian: Zigmuntas Karolis Radvila; 1591–1642) was a Polish–Lithuanian noble, who served as the Chamberlain (podkomorzy) at Poznań from 1625, Queen's Carver (krajczy) from 1617, Carver of Lithuania from 1633, Cupbearer of Lithuania from 1638, and Governor (voivode) of Nowogródek from 1642. He was a member of the Knights Hospitaller Order and the patron of Knight Hospitaller centers in Poznań and Stołowicze (in Lithuania).

== Life ==
Radziwiłł was born on 4 December 1591 in Nieśwież, to Mikołaj Krzysztof "Sierotka" Radziwiłł (nicknamed "The Orphan") and Halaszka Eufemia Wiśniowiecka.

In 1621, he took part in the Battle of Khotyn (1621), and later commanded Lisowczycy mercenaries in 1622 during the period of their service in the Holy Roman Empire.

After the death of his older brother, Albrycht Władysław Radziwiłł, he inherited ordynacja of Nieśwież in 1636, but gave it up to his brother Aleksander Ludwik Radziwiłł.

He died on 5 November 1642 in Assisi, Italy.
