= Bohdanow =

Property in Belarus

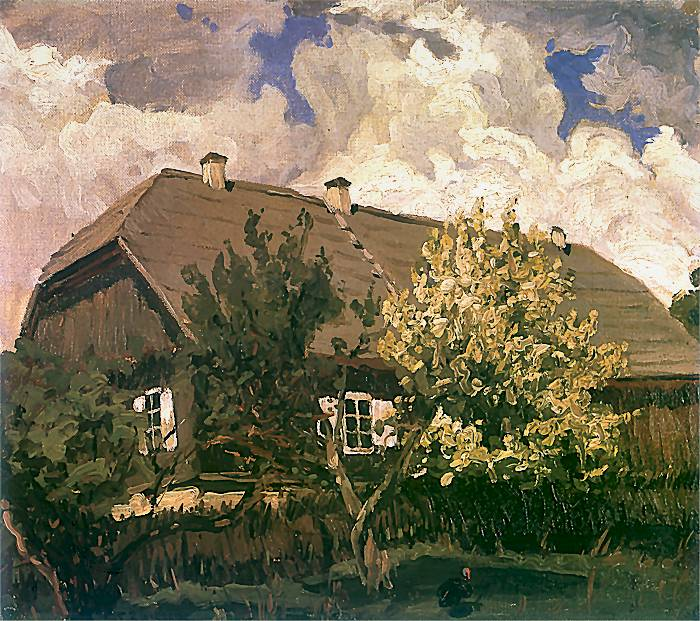
A 1902 painting of the Bohdanow manor house by Ferdynand Ruszczyc

Bohdanow was before World War II a property in Belarus. It was seated on the way from Vilnius to Wolozyn, through Ashmyany, some 80 km (50 mi) from Vilnius.

The property included the Bohdanow area with two manor houses, one old, made of wood, from 1690 and the other in classic 17th century stile with column outside holding the roof of the building. Bohnadow included also the land of Goreckowszczyzna, Holoblewszczyzna with another manor house and Rymowicze (now Rymavichy), in total about 10,000 hectares (24,711 acres). It was formerly a part of Prince Bohdan Pawłowicz Sapieha's property and was named after its owner.

== Shifting ownership of the manor ==
In the 16th century, the manor was passed from the Sapieha family to the Pac family, then to Danielewicz of Ostoja coat of arms. In 1742, Franciszek Danielewicz sold all the Bohdanow properties to his clan brother (Clan of Ostoja) Tomasz Lachowiecki-Czechowicz of Ostoja coat of arms and his wife Barbara Sulistrowska. Bohdanow was owned by the Czechowicz family until 1836 when part of the Bohdanow property, mainly Bohdanow with the Manor houses, was sold to Ferdynand Ruszczyc of Lis coat of arms. During that time Czechowicz raised several buildings on the property, created a park, and raised beavers.

Ferdynand Ruszczyc and his wife Anna Czechowicz developed the property further. They tended the property well, and conserved the wooden church on the property built during its ownership by the Pac family. The grandson of Ferdinand Ruszczyc was also given the name Ferdynand and he was the one to continue managing the property doing conservation work on the property.

The last owner of the Bohdanow was the son of Ferdinand, Edward Ruszczyc and was managing the property together with his wife Krystyna Czechowicz.

== Ruszczyc paintings ==
The younger Ferdynand Ruszczyc (1870–1936) was a well known artist and he made several drawings and paintings of the Bohdanow landscape, the old Manor house and of the interior inside both manor houses. Paintings and drawing are now in the possession of the National Museum in Warsaw. Ruszczyc was also professor of Stefan Batory University in Vilnius.

== Current ==
Bohdanow was totally destroyed during World War II, and after the war the Belarus administration razed the remaining park and cut down all the trees around the property, making open field.

What is left of the Bohdanow property are a few paintings and drawings by Ferdinand Ruszczyc, some photos and written stories about the Bohdanow to be found in the epic work of Roman Aftanazy, Dzieje Rezydencji na dawnych kresach Rzeczpospolitej where old properties, castles and manor houses in Lithuania, Belarus and Volyn (today southwest of Ukraine) that have not survived the World War II have been documented.

== See also ==
- Danielewicz
- Czechowicz
- Clan of Ostoja
- Ostoja coat of arms
- Pac family
- Sapieha family
