= Danilevičius =

Danilevičius and Danilavičius are Lithuanized forms of the Polish surnames Danilewicz and Danilowicz. Notable people with this surname include:

- Tomas Danilevičius (born 1978), Lithuanian former professional footballer and president of the Lithuanian Football Federation
- Vigantas Danilavičius (born 1963), Lithuanian politician
