= Danielewicz families =

Danielewicz is a patronymic surname, meaning descendants of Daniel or Danilo. Several Danielewicz families were members of Polish–Lithuanian Commonwealth nobility and their descendants continue to the present.

== Danielewicz families ==
Spelling: Danielewicz, Danilewicz, Daniłowicz, Daniełowicz, Danieliwicz, Danielewitz and en: Danilovich.

The family in Russia that took their name after Daniel goes back to Daniel of Moscow. Daniel's son Afanasy Danilovich was the Prince of Novgorod (died 1322) followed by Yury Danilovich, the prince of Moscow and Novgorod. In the 15th century another family is mentioned in the chronicles: Daniel Alexandrovich and his son Vladimir Danilovich were elected as princes of Pskov. Vladimir Danilovich (Danielewicz) settled down in Lithuania and his descendants used Ostoja Coat of Arms

- Ostoja Danielewicz family: (Danielewicz of Ostoja Coat of Arms, Danielewicz of clan Ostoja, Polish: Danielewicz herbu Ostoja) - from 14th century in Pskov and in 15th century in Lithuania, Belarus and later in 18-19th century also in Volyn, Prussia and Poland. This family is the first to use surname Danielewicz.
- Danielewicz of Rola coat of arms - in Volyn, Ukraine and later Poland. From late 15th century.
- Danielewicz of Leliwa coat of arms - in Lithuania. There are no records referring to the origin of this family, possibly it is line of Ostoja Danielewicz that later used Leliwa CoA from 17th century.
- Danielewicz of Grzymala coat of arms - in Lithuania and Prussia 18th century
- Danielewicz of Sas coat of arms - in Ukraine of tatar or kosac origin holding CoA that is called "variant of Sas", 19th century.
- Danielewicz of own CoA, In Prussia according to Siebmachers Wappenbuch in 19th century.

Furthermore, in the Armorial of Tadeusz Gajl there are more families of different clans listed with different spelling. Daniełowicz - clan Godziemba and Sas, Daniłowicz - clan Leliwa, Ostoja, Rola, Sas and Sulima, Danielewicz - clan Godziemba, Ostoja and Rola, Danilewicz - clan Boncza I, Leliwa, Ostoja, Prus I and Sas, Danieliwicz - clan Ostoja.

All above are noble families of Danielewicz vel Danilewicz being part of different clans and not family related with each. Below, CoA of Rola, Sas, Grzymała, Godziemba, Sulima, Bończa, Prus and Ostoja.

== Gallery ==

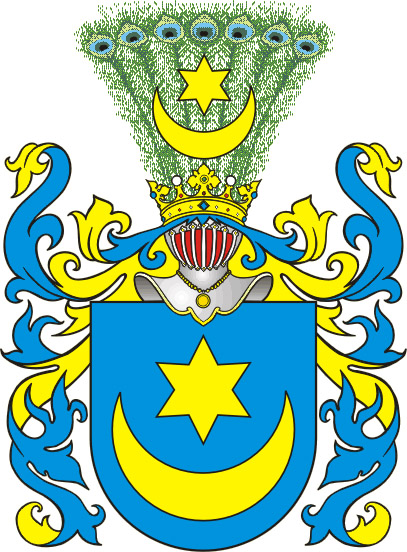

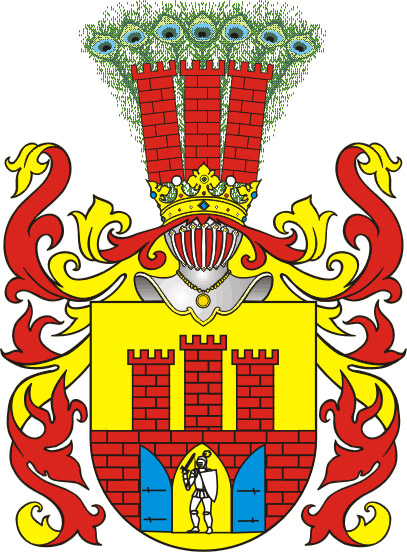

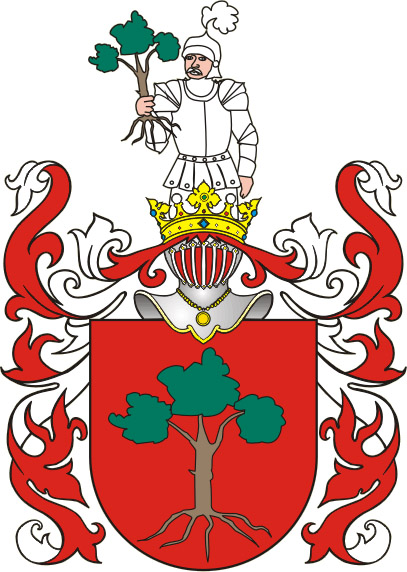

== See also ==
- Offices in the Polish–Lithuanian Commonwealth
- Polish heraldry
- Polish clans
- Heraldic clan

Lists of people with related surnames:

- Danilewicz
- Danielewicz (surname)
- Danilowicz
