= Danilowicz =

Danilowicz is a Polish-language surname of, among others, a noble family of Rutheninan origin and Jews with roots in Danilavičy, Belarus and other place names which include "Daniłowicz" (including the form "Daniłowicze") in their names. Its archaic feminine forms are Daniłowiczówna (unmarried) and Daniłowiczówa (married).

A transliteration of its Ruthenian/Russian form is Danilovich, Ukrainian: Danilovych, Belarusian: Danilavich/Danilovich. The surname should not be confused with the East Slavic patronymic "Danilovich". Both literally mean the same, "son of Danilo", but in the pronunciation of the surname the stress syllable is penultimate, while in the patronymic the second syllable is stressed.

The surname may refer to:

- Jan Daniłowicz (1558–1624), Polish noble
- Jan Mikołaj Daniłowicz (1607–1650), Polish noble
- Jean Danilovich (born 1946), American amateur tennis player
- John Danilovich (born 1950), American business executive
- Mikołaj Daniłowicz (1570–1628), Polish noble
- Ruvik Danilovich (born 1971), Israeli politician
- Teofila Zofia Sobieska, née Daniłowiczówna (1607–1661), Polish noble

== See also ==
- Danilowitz, Yiddish spelling of the name
