= Jan Mikołaj Daniłowicz =

- Coat of arms: Sas
- Born: 1607
- Died: 20 November 1650 (aged 42–43)
- Family: Daniłowicz
- Consort: Elżbieta Opalińska h. Łodzia; Zofia Tęczyńska h. Topór
- Issue: none
- Father: Mikołaj Daniłowicz
- Mother: Helena Uchańska h. Radwan

Jan Mikołaj Daniłowicz (born 1607 in Vilnius – 20 November 1650) was a Polish–Lithuanian noble and politician. Crown Podstoli from 1620, Crown Court Treasurer from 1627, and from 1632, Grand Crown Treasurer.

He was the son of Mikołaj Daniłowicz, Grand Crown Treasurer from 1617 to 1624.

Known as a skillful administrator and commended for the ability to gather funds for the Polish-Swedish wars and Smolensk War. At the same time he was one of the wealthiest, if not the wealthiest, magnates in the Commonwealth.

He married Sophie Tęczyńską, the daughter of Gabriel Tęczyński. He died without issue.
