= Ruthenian nobility of Galicia =

Noble class of ethnic Ukrainians in what is now western Ukraine

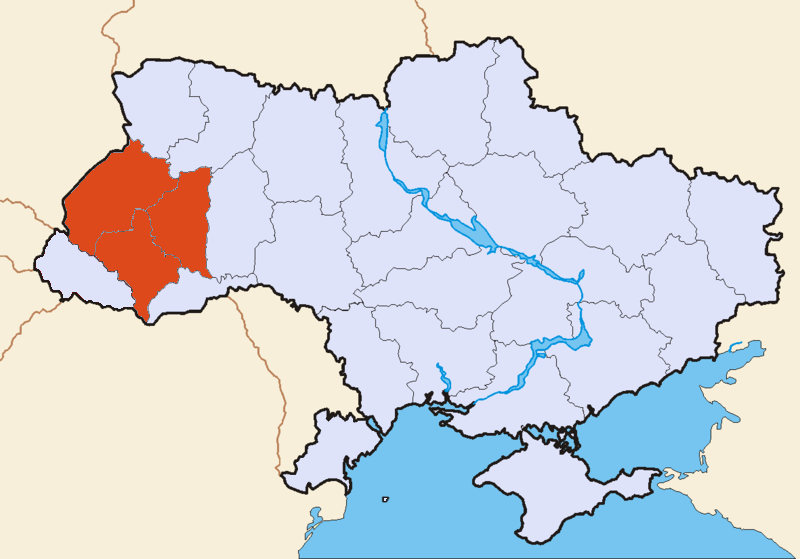
Map of (eastern) Galicia in today's western Ukraine

The noble class of Ruthenians in what is now Western Ukraine enjoyed a number of legal and social privileges. They were referred to by the term shliakhta ( Ruthenian:шлѧхта, Ukrainian: шляхта, Polish: szlachta). Estimates of their numbers vary. According to one estimate, by the mid-19th century, there were approximately 32,000 Ukrainian nobles in the western Ukrainian territory of Galicia, over 25% of whom lived in 21 villages near the town of Sambir. They comprised less than 2% of the ethnic Ukrainian population. Other estimates place the number of nobles at 67,000 people at the end of the 18th century and 260,000 by the end of the 19th century, or approximately 6% of the ethnic Ukrainian population. The nobles tended to live in compact settlements either in villages populated mostly by nobles or in particular areas of larger villages.

Unlike in the case of their Polish ethnic counterparts, the szlachta, the Ukrainian nobility in Galicia as a class played a marginal role in western Ukrainian society, which came to be dominated by Eastern Catholic clergy families, who formed a tight-knit hereditary caste that constituted the wealthiest and most highly educated group within the Ukrainian population. There was considerable overlap between priests and nobles, however, with many priestly families also belonging to the nobility. During the late 19th century until the 1930s, more than half of the Ukrainian priestly families in western Ukraine had noble origins. Such families tended to identify themselves primarily as priests rather than as nobles.

== History and political activity ==
Sas coat of arms. Many Ukrainian nobles belonged to families carrying this coat of arms

=== Origins ===
The territory of western Ukraine was part of the medieval state of Kievan Rus'. After its collapse, that state's westernmost part formed the independent Kingdom of Galicia–Volhynia. By the end of the 14th century, this territory had become part of the Kingdom of Poland. Over the following centuries, most of the wealthy native landowning nobility were eventually Polonized by adopting the dominant Polish nationality and also converting to Roman Catholicism, thus completely assimilating into Polish society.

The nobility in western Ukraine that retained its non-Polish identity was generally poorer and developed as a social class in the 14th century.

==== Ukrainian or East Slavic origins ====
According to mainstream Ukrainian historiography, the western Ukrainian nobility developed out of a mixture of three groups of people: poor Rus' boyars (East Slavic aristocrats from the medieval era), descendants of princely retainers or druzhina (free soldiers in the service of the Rus' princes), and peasants who had been free during the times of the Kingdom of Galicia–Volhynia. During the 12th and 13th centuries, fortified villages were built by Kievan Rus' and Galician princes to defend the local lucrative salt trade and the borders with the Kingdoms of Poland and Hungary.

These villages were located southwest of Lviv and Przemyśl in areas such as those surrounding Sambir, which in modern times have been the heartland for Ukrainian noble settlement. These villages were populated and defended by poor or minor boyars and druzhina. After the Kingdom of Galicia–Volhynia was absorbed by Jagiellonian Poland in the 14th century as the Ruthenian Voivodeship, the noble status of these poor boyars and druzhina was confirmed in exchange for military service to the Polish Crown; those poor boyars who failed to confirm their noble status were reduced to the level of serfs or, more frequently, town servants and assimilated into those social groups. The Ukrainian nobility's development thus involved a process of poor Rus boyars and druzhina changing their allegiance from the defunct Galicia-Volhynia and its princes to that of the Polish state and becoming legally integrated into the Polish system as nobles.

==== Polish origins ====
In the 1930s the Polish government attempted to assimilate western Ukrainian nobles into Polish culture. At that time, Polish researchers claimed that the Ukrainian nobles were descended from poor Polish nobles who became assimilated into Ukrainian culture by adopting the Ukrainian language and Orthodox religion of the peasants among whom they lived. They noted that the period of Polish rule involved the settlement of newly acquired Ukrainian territories by Poles and that the Ukrainian nobility's speech frequently used Polish words and expressions. The Polish historians also pointed out that the early 19th-century western Ukrainian nobles tended to ally themselves with Polish rather than Ruthenian or Ukrainian causes politically. This was seen as a vestige of their originally Polish roots.

Contemporary Ukrainian historians write that while it is likely that some poor Polish nobles may have assimilated into Ukrainian culture in isolated instances, the number of Ukrainian nobles was simply too large to be accounted for by assimilated Polish nobles. They also point out that those arguing in favour the Polish origins, while writing about the Polonization of wealthy landowning boyars (nobles), completely ignore the documented existence of poor boyars and druzhina who inhabited western Ukraine before Polish rule and failed to account for what happened to this large group of people after western Ukrainian lands were absorbed by Poland. Furthermore, given that the Polish culture was dominant and that for centuries Poles controlled the local administration, it seems unrealistic that large numbers of Poles would assimilate to the subservient Ukrainian culture and to adopt the Ukrainian Orthodox or Greek Catholic faiths, which were at a disadvantage relative to the Polish Roman Catholic religion. Moreover, some western Ukrainian nobles lived in villages populated exclusively by nobles. Such nobles had little contact with Ukrainian peasants and thus no means to be assimilated by them. In terms of political allegiance, although Western Ukrainian nobles did side with Poles against Ukrainian peasants during much of the 19th century, the nobility's loyalty was exclusively political in nature and focused on the retention of their traditional privileges; there was little movement to adopt the Polish language or Roman Catholic religion by the Ukrainian nobles despite their political cooperation with the Poles.

=== During the Polish–Lithuanian Commonwealth ===
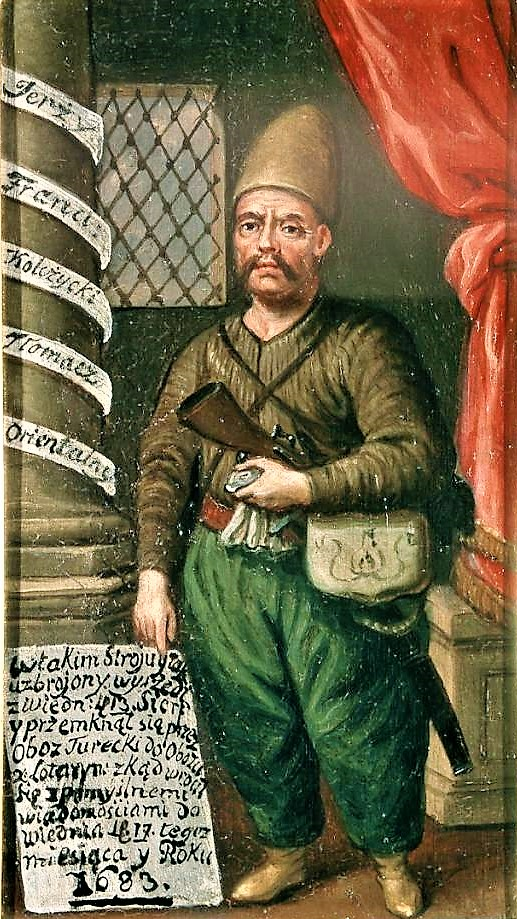
Jerzy Franciszek Kulczycki, a nobleman from Sambir region (1640-1694) and founder of the first Viennese coffee shop

Western Ukrainian nobles enjoyed the legal rights and privileges of other nobles. They had their own court system and unlike Ukrainian peasants were not under the authority of the Polish landlords. Villages populated exclusively by nobles were typically self-governing, and nobles living in mixed towns were under the authority of their own governing bodies. The elected heads of self-governing Ukrainian noble communities were called prefects. Noble villages tended to be older than other villages and typically carried the names of the noble families associated with them, such as Kulchytsi (Kulchytsky family), Mokhnate (Mokhnatsky family), etc. Unlike many Polish nobles, western Ukrainian nobles did not own serfs and instead worked their own lands. Their relative poverty served as a barrier to assimilation with the wealthy Polish landowners and helped them to retain their identity. Nobles usually lived in compact groups occupying entire villages or parts of villages. Although Ukrainian nobles were scattered throughout western Ukraine, two regions had particularly large concentrations of them: southern Galicia, north of the Carpathian Mountains and south-west of the city of Lviv; and in the western parts of Podolia, to the east of Galicia in what is now the Ternopil Oblast. The most commonly used coats of arms by western Ukrainian nobles were Sas and Korczak.

Despite their obligation to serve the Polish crown, during the 15th through the 17th centuries, western Ukrainian nobles sometimes took part in anti-Polish uprisings. At this time, the Ukrainian nobles considered themselves honour-bound to defend the Orthodox Church. Due to their shared Orthodox faith, when the Moldavian prince Bogdan III the One-Eyed invaded Polish-controlled Galicia in 1509, the local Ukrainian nobles joined this invasion en masse. After the Polish victory over Moldavian forces in 1510, many of the Ukrainian nobles' lands were confiscated by the Polish authorities, although they were returned to them after the Ukrainian nobles claimed that they had been coerced into joining the Moldavians. In 1511, the Polish king declared that Ukrainian nobles were banned from participating in religious ceremonies in Moldavia. Opposition from the western Ukrainian nobles delayed the implementation of the Union of Brest, the recognition by the Orthodox Church in Ukraine of the Pope, by several decades in Galicia. Noble resistance resulted in Galicia being the last part of Polish-ruled Ukraine to accept the Union with Catholicism. Several western Ukrainian nobles travelled east and joined the Zaporozhian Cossacks. One of them, Petro Konashevych-Sahaidachny, became the leader of the Cossacks in the early 17th century. He remained loyal to Poland.

During the times when western Ukraine was part of the Kingdom of Poland, the nobles had a duty to defend the state they were in. Accordingly, they were obligated to participate in regular military reviews where they presented themselves and their weapons. The relative poverty of the Ukrainian nobility was evident in the fact that few owned armour, very few could afford to come on horseback, and they were typically armed only with sabres, muskets or even small calibre bird-hunting rifles.

=== Under Austria-Hungary and into the twentieth century ===
==== Abolition of serfdom and loss of status ====
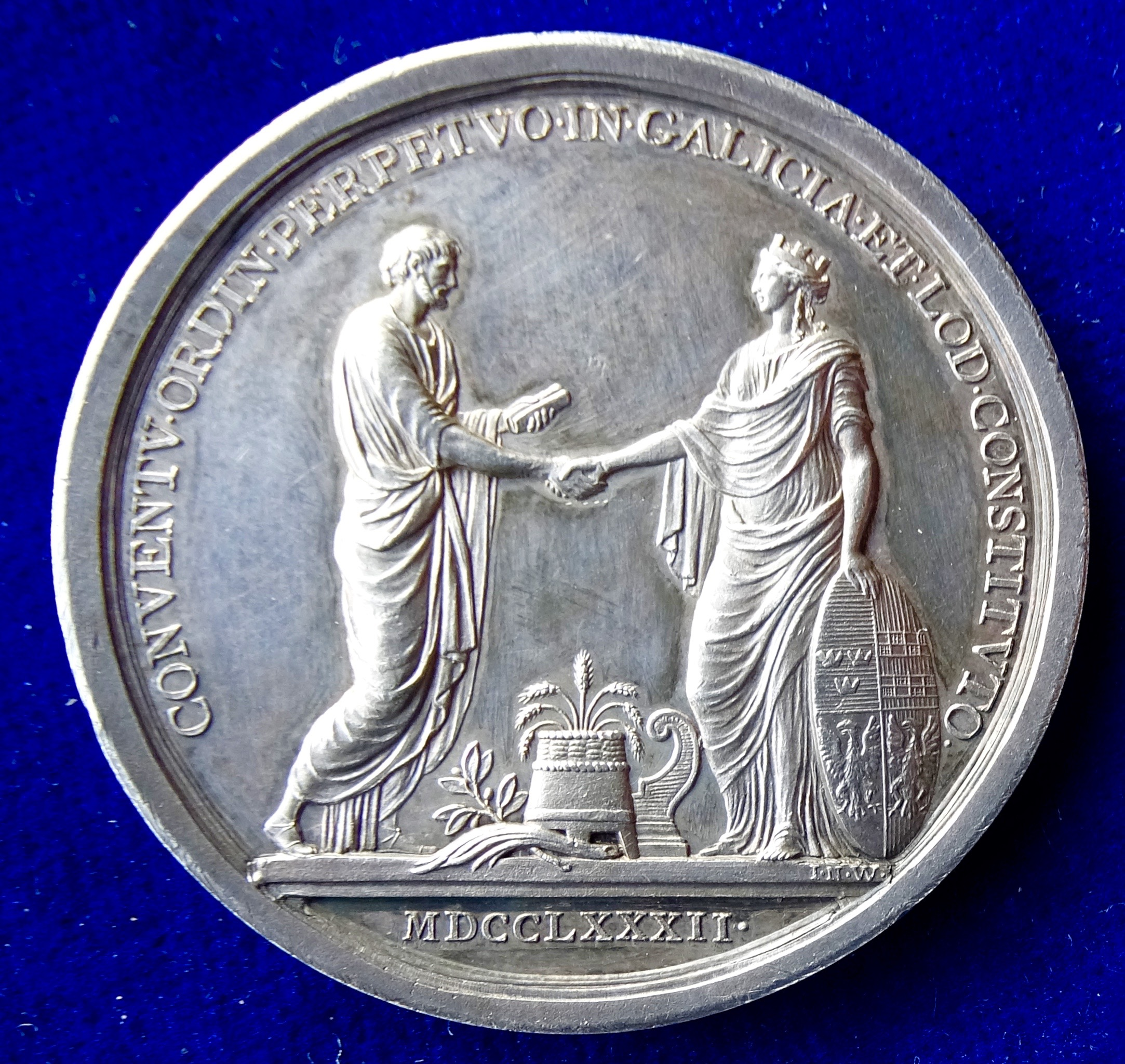
Medal of 1782 commemorating the constitution of the parliament in Galicia and Lodomeria by Joseph II, Holy Roman Emperor. It shows an allegorical depiction of imperial law (left) being handed over to the allegorical figure of Galicia with her shield showing the coat of arms of the lands

In 1772, western Ukraine was annexed by the Habsburg monarchy during the First Partition of Poland–Lithuania becoming the new Kingdom of Galicia and Lodomeria. The Western Ukrainian nobility, whose self-image was centred on their function of militarily defending the kingdom, found themselves without a social role within the new political circumstances and from this point defined themselves largely by their differences from and superiority to the peasants. In 1848, serfdom was abolished. Before the abolishment of serfdom in 1848, the Ukrainian nobility enjoyed a lifestyle that was quite different from that of the Ukrainian peasants. Unlike Ukrainian peasants, Ukrainian nobles worked on their own lands and were not forced to work for the Polish nobility. They enjoyed their own court system and were not under the authority of local Polish-dominated courts. Unlike serfs, Ukrainian nobles were also not obligated to perform communal duty such as working on roads, which they considered to be humiliating.

In contrast to the Polish nobles who had owned serfs, the Ukrainian nobles did not experience economic losses when serfdom was abolished. Instead, they experienced a loss in social status and standing. The Ukrainian nobles lost all of their privileges, they were placed under the same legal authority and given the same obligations as the peasants. In 1860, noble self-government was abolished and noble and peasant elected bodies were integrated. The nobility attempted to continue to unofficially elect their own leaders, traditionally known as prefects, despite official integration with the peasant community. Multiple appeals to the Austrian government in the 1860s seeking to obtain separate legal standings for themselves failed, with rare exceptions such as sometimes being able to avoid having to perform compulsory roadwork. Thus, in the mid-19th century, the political and socioeconomic differences between the Ukrainian nobles and the Ukrainian peasants disappeared.

In one of the two regions with a large concentration of Ukrainian nobles, western Podolia, the loss of special noble legal privileges and elimination of peasant serfdom led to the assimilation of most of the western Ukrainian nobility into the Ukrainian peasantry and to the disappearance of the nobility as a social group. In contrast, nobles from southern Galicia would retain their distinct self-identity well into the 20th century.

==== Evolution from class to national identity ====
Because the Western Ukrainian nobles had not owned estates or serfs, unlike the Polish nobility they were not hated by the peasants. Conversely, because they had never been enserfed, the Ukrainian nobility did not share the peasants' animosity towards the Polish nobility and indeed felt a class solidarity with them.

Despite sharing the language and religion of their Ukrainian peasant neighbours, throughout the 19th century the Ukrainian nobles in western Ukraine differed from the peasants by expressing loyalty to the defunct Polish state. When collecting folklore in western Ukraine, author Ivan Franko recorded the following saying spoken by Ukrainian nobles: "When Poland is restored again, Maria Teresa will then come out of hell," meaning that Austrian Empress Maria Theresa committed a great sin by partitioning Poland. The Ukrainian nobles also tended to side with the Polish nobility during conflicts between the Polish and Ukrainian communities. In 1848, Ukrainian nobles volunteered for the Polish National Guard and in 1863 they took up donations in support of Polish–Lithuanian rebels in the Russian Empire. Villages populated mostly by the Ukrainian nobility tended to vote for Polish candidates and to oppose efforts to spread literacy among the peasants. The nobles were so politically preoccupied with trying to retain or win back their special rights as nobles that they did not engage in other forms of political activism. The alienation of the nobles from the Ukrainian national movement was not one-sided. The Ukrainian national movement was very peasant-focused and rejected the nobility, whose social background did not fit the nationalist narrative. The nobility were often treated as scapegoats and blamed for electoral failures; the press of the national movement accused them of greed and of selling their votes to the Poles. Almost none of the 19th-century political activists seeking to alleviate the plight of Ukrainian peasants, or to spread literacy, or to encourage Ukrainization, or to limit economic exploitation, were nobles. The nobles' consistent indifference or opposition towards Ukrainian causes resulted in some rural Ukrainian activists claiming that the nobles were not even part of the Ukrainian nation.

Until the mid-19th century, because the Ukrainian nobles were oriented towards their class standing, they were opposed to the interests of the Ukrainian peasants. By the end of that century, however, the idea of the old multinational Polish–Lithuanian Commonwealth gave way to competing modern Ukrainian and Polish nationalisms. This meant that national ideas eclipsed class loyalties. At that time, most of the Ukrainian nobility in western Ukraine linked itself to the Ukrainian national movement. The nobility was represented by the Association of the Ruthenian Gentry, which allied itself with the conservative and religious elements within the Ukrainian national movement. Despite their allegiance to the Ukrainian national cause, these nobles maintained their separation from the peasants. For example, rather than joining the peasants in reading clubs for cultural activities, nobles participated in their own "gentry casinos." This aroused some negative feelings among the peasants. Russophiles attempted to exploit the differences between nobles and peasants, and there was a stronger tendency to support ideological Russophilia among the nobility than among the general Galician population. Indeed, the noble candidate from Sambir county in the elections of 1911, Ivan Kulchytsky, even declared

"now we have recovered our sight and shall not allow the bastards to trick us with Ukraine…. You should know that from now on we do not give a damn for Ukraine and have returned to the historical road. From now on we are Russians."

In general, however, the nobles adopted a Ukrainian national orientation. By the beginning of the 20th century, noble gatherings often concluded with the singing of the Ukrainian national anthem, Shche ne vmerla Ukraina ("Ukraine has not yet Died"). The 1912 commemoration of the 17th century Cossack leader Petro Konashevych-Sahaidachny, a member of the petty gentry from Galicia, in 1912 served to underscore the new affiliation of the Ukrainian gentry towards the Ukrainian national movement. During these celebrations, the Cossacks were represented not only as peasant runaways but also as nobles defending the Ukrainian nation. In this way, the nobles found a place for themselves within the Ukrainian national narrative.

=== During and After the First World War ===
On the eve of World War I, many Ukrainian nobles joined the Ukrainian Sich Riflemen, a patriotic Ukrainian unit within the Austro-Hungarian Army. Dmytro Vitovsky and Myron Tarnavsky, two of the supreme commanders of the Ukrainian Galician Army which fought against Poland for Ukrainian independence after World War I, were noblemen. Yevhen Petrushevych, president of the West Ukrainian People's Republic was from a family of noble priests who traced their origins to Galician boyars. In a survey given to members of the Ukrainian National Council, the legislative body of the West Ukrainian People's Republic, although 2.4% listed their primary social origin as nobility several of those who listed their origin as clergy also came from noble families.

During the period of Polish rule over Western Ukraine between the world wars, efforts by the Polish government in the 1930s to split the Ukrainian nobility from other Ukrainians (through the formation of Kola Szlacheckie) were unsuccessful. Such efforts backfired, resulting in many nobles rejecting and even concealing their status as nobles in order to avoid possible association with the Polish nation and to emphasize their solidarity with the Ukrainian people, most of whom were the descendants of peasants.

In the early 21st century, an attempt was made to revive the Association of Ruthenian Gentry. Based in the traditional heartland of western Ukrainian nobility, the town of Sambir, its first head was the priest Petro Sas-Pohoretsky.

== Culture ==
=== Speech and naming traditions ===
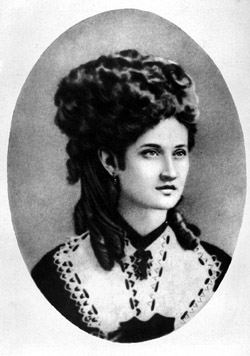
Natalia Kobrynska (born Ozarkevych), writer born into a noble priestly family, 1880s

The earliest recorded observations noted that western Ukrainian nobles spoke the Ukrainian (or Ruthenian) language, rather than Polish. Although they spoke the same language as the Ukrainian peasants, they maintained their own particular traditions. Nobles tended to be more likely to be literate than peasants. The nobility tended to use the literary Ukrainian language rather than local village dialects. Reflecting some exposure to education, the noble speech was also differentiated from that of the peasants by the frequent use of Polish and Latin words and expressions.

The Western Ukrainian nobility often used as surnames the names of the villages where they lived. For example, the nobles of Terlo adopted the name Terletsky, and those of Kulchytsi adopted the name Kulchytsky. Surnames ending in -ich (-ич) or -ik (-ик) were also used. They usually gave their children Ukrainian names but on occasion gave them Polonized Ukrainian names.

=== Lifestyle ===
Villages populated primarily by nobles generally had no central planning, with the nobles building their homes wherever they liked on their properties. Western Ukrainian nobles typically lived in small one or two-room houses with straw roofs whose interiors were in most ways indistinguishable from those of the peasants. Noble homes differed from those of peasants primarily by their outward appearance. Noble homes had front porches, with columns, and larger windows than did peasant homes.

Those nobles who were not also priests usually worked as farmers and, after the abolition of serfdom in 1848, had lifestyles very similar to those of the Ukrainian peasants. When possible, the nobility sought to use common fields and forests that were different from those used by peasants. A minor difference between peasants and nobles was the peasants tended to use oxen for ploughing, while the nobility favoured the use of horses for such work. This tradition was likely a vestige of earlier times when the nobles' ancestors were obligated to occasionally use horses for military activities and as scouts.

The nobles amused themselves by dancing and visiting each other in their homes; they tended to segregate themselves from peasants when doing so. Among their favourite dances were the same ones beloved by non-noble Ukrainians, such as the Kolomyika and the Kozak. The Mazurka, popular among Poles, was shunned by Ukrainian nobles.

=== Marriage and family ===
Petty gentry family, modern Ternopil Oblast, 1880

The nobility avoided marriage with non-nobles despite a similar lifestyle to those of peasants. For example, in one village between 1785 and 1855 out of 216 marriages, 183 were between peasants, 19 were between nobles and only 3 were mixed marriages between nobles and peasants (although some unrecorded marriages could have been mixed). The status of nobility was conferred through the male line, so the children of noblewomen who married commoners were no longer considered to be nobles. To ensure noble spouses, if there were few nobles in the immediate area marriages were sometimes arranged with noble families from distant villages, and as late as the 19th century there were recorded cases of people being married against their will. Even into the 1980s in some villages populated by noble families, the members of the nobility avoided marrying commoners. The few cases of marriage between nobles and commoners typically involved particularly poor nobles marrying prosperous non-nobles. The writer Ivan Franko was the product of such a marriage.

The nobility was renowned for their elaborate wedding ceremonies, which by custom lasted from Saturday until Saturday and which attempted to recreate or maintain the old traditional grand celebrations of distant ancestors. Noble brides wore white for the wedding ceremony, unlike peasant brides who would wear embroidered costumes. Large numbers of noble guests were invited, including nobles from neighbouring villages. The groom would arrive for the ceremony on horseback, while the bride would arrive in a carriage. Following the wedding ceremony, young noblemen would fire their pistols into the air as a way of saluting the new pair and wishing them a long life. Beer, wine and food were provided for an entire week of celebrations. The first three days of festivities were spent at the bride's house. Afterwards, the dowry (which could consist of items such as a cow, horse, cart, plough or land) was presented to the groom's family and the party shifted to the groom's house for the remaining four days.

=== Clothing ===
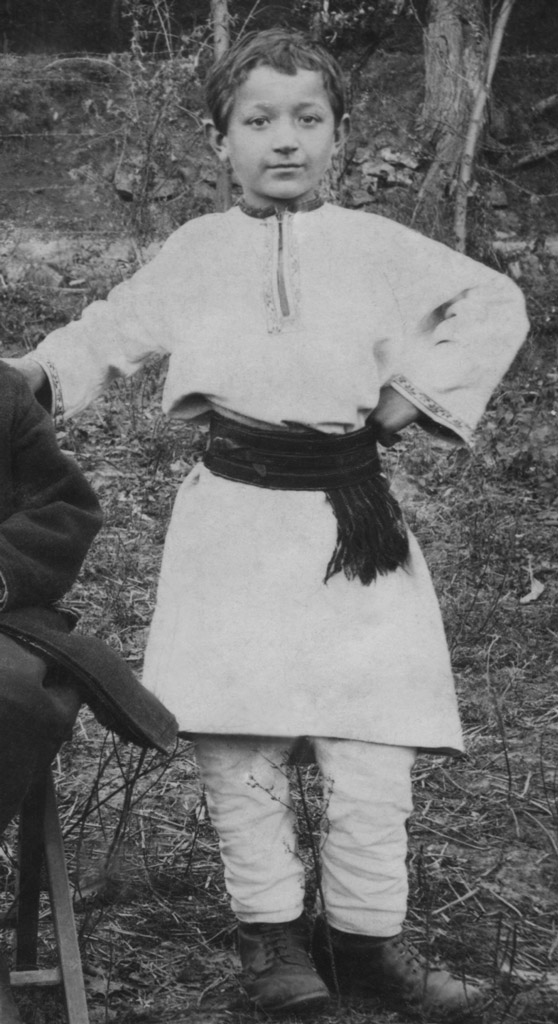
Jacques Hnizdovsky of Korab coat of arms in wearing traditional Ukrainian szlachta clothing

Clothing served a very important function for the nobles because after they lost their legal privileges in the early 19th century, manner of dressing was one of the few ways they could demonstrate that they were different from the peasants. The Ukrainian nobility retained particular forms of clothing that differentiated them from both Ukrainian peasants and Polish nobility, although it was generally of the Ukrainian type. Nobles tended to decorate their clothes with black rather than red embroidery because the latter colour was considered peasant-like. Indeed, they tended to avoid colours in general and mostly dressed in shades of black and grey. In some regions, it was customary for men to wear blue cloaks with grey edges similar to Cossack zupans. Women wore coats with fox-fur collars. Nobles also wore vests with two rows instead of one row of buttons. The village nobility were often interested in wearing the same clothes that townsfolk wore. The men often wore collared shirts and even ties. Because many of the nobles were unable to afford to buy such clothes, they sewed approximations of them using the same materials that peasants used for their clothing. If a noble married a peasant, the noble was forbidden by other nobles from wearing clothes identifying themselves as a noble and if caught doing so, his or her "noble" clothes would be torn off.

== Relationships with Ukrainian peasants ==
Despite having a similar lifestyle to the peasants, members of the nobility were noted for the proud way in which they distinguished themselves from them. The fact that their ancestors, unlike those of their peasant neighbours, had never been serfs was a source of pride for noble families. The nobles were fond of the Polish saying, "Szlachcic na zagrodzie równy wojewodzie" ("The noble behind his garden wall is the province governor's equal"). They typically added "nobilis" or "nobilis agrikola" (denoted their work as farmers) when signing their names, and it was said that even when herding livestock or trading in the markets they carried documents confirming their noble rank in their pockets. Members of the nobility, regardless of level of education, typically knew the distant history and exploits of their families and would pass these stories on to their children.

As late as the late 19th century, long after the legal distinctions between western Ukrainian nobles and peasants disappeared, certain customs maintaining noble social superiority over their peasant neighbours were retained. The nobility denigrated the peasants by referring to them as "nine-skinned" (дев’ятьшкірними) in reference to their supposed greater weight and referred to peasant clothes as rags. Nobles of any age, even youths, typically addressed all peasants, even those older or wealthier than themselves, with the informal "you" (ty,) while even older and wealthier peasants addressed all nobles with the formal pronoun vy. In villages with noble populations, taverns had separate areas set aside for the nobles, whose tables were covered in tablecloths and who used chairs rather than the crude benches used by the peasants; in such towns nobles and peasants also had separate areas in the churches. The latter practice continues to survive in some western Ukrainian villages populated by the descendants of nobles. In some regions on Easter, nobles typically blessed their Easter baskets within the churches while peasants' baskets were blessed outside. In other regions, the nobles were granted the right to cut folding collars from shirts worn by peasants because the peasants were deemed unworthy of wearing them. As late as the 1950s, on some collective farms in Soviet-ruled western Ukraine, nobles and peasants were assigned to separate work-groups.

The peasants had mixed feelings about the nobility. On the one hand, peasant songs mentioned noble laziness and shoddy workmanship. Despite nobles' feelings of superiority, during the late 19th century the western Ukrainian nobility had a reputation among the peasants of being poorer than peasants because they did not work as hard. Due to the nobility's material poverty, the peasants sometimes viewed the nobles' proclamations of their status and expressions of superiority as ridiculous. On the other hand, it was considered a great honour in a peasant household if someone married a noble.

== In literature ==
The Western Ukrainian poet Ivan Franko, whose mother was a noblewoman, supported the peasants and in his writings frequently mocked the Ukrainian nobility's feelings of superiority.

A western Ukrainian nobleman serves as a protagonist in the story Der Don Juan von Kolomea (The Don Juan of Kolomiya) written by Austrian writer Leopold von Sacher-Masoch, whose mother was from the western Ukrainian nobility.

== Prominent western Ukrainians with noble backgrounds ==
- Ivan Franko, Ukrainian poet. His father was a village blacksmith of German ethnic origin, but his mother was from the petty noble Kulchytsky family.
- Jacques Hnizdovsky, Ukrainian artist.
- Petro Konashevych-Sahaidachny, 16th-17th century Cossack leader, of noble origins from the Sambir region of Galicia.
- Solomiya Krushelnytska, an early twentieth-century opera singer, was born into the family of a priest with noble origins.
- Jerzy Franciszek Kulczycki, a hero during the 1683 Battle of Vienna, was allegedly the first person to open a coffee house in Vienna. Nobleman from Sambir region.
- Soter Ortynsky, first Ukrainian Catholic Bishop in the United States (1907–1916), a nobleman from Sambir region
- Yevhen Petrushevych, president of the West Ukrainian People's Republic, from a priestly family who traced their descent to Galician boyars
- Leopold von Sacher-Masoch, an Austrian writer whose mother was from a Ukrainian noble family.
- Julian Sas-Kuilovsky, head of the Ukrainian Greek Catholic Church 1899–1900; nobleman from Sambir region
- Dmytro Vitovsky, first commander of the Ukrainian Galician Army and organizer of the Ukrainian takeover of Lviv in October 1918; of noble origin from the Halych region .
- Stefan Yavorsky, first president of the Most Holy Synod of the Russian Orthodox Church; nobleman from Lviv region, heraldric sign Sas
- Denis Zubrytsky, first Ukrainian historian in Galicia and major figure in the Galician Russophile movement.

== See also ==
- Cossack nobility
- Okolica szlachecka
- Zaścianek
