= Danielewicz (surname) =

Danielewicz is a Polish-language surname, of patronymic origin, meaning descendants of Daniel or Danilo. Notable people with this surname include:

- Adam Danielewicz (1846–1935), Polish statistician
- Sigismund Danielewicz (1847–1927), California trade union organizer and anarchist
- Jerzy Danielewicz (historian) (1921–1997), Polish historian
- Jerzy Danielewicz (philologist) (born 1942), Polish classical philologist
- Krzysztof Danielewicz (born 1991), Polish footballer

== See also ==
- Danielewicz families, several Polish noble families
