= Olesko Castle =

15th to 17th century castle in Lviv Oblast, Ukraine

- Олеський замок
- Olesko, Lviv Oblast, Ukraine
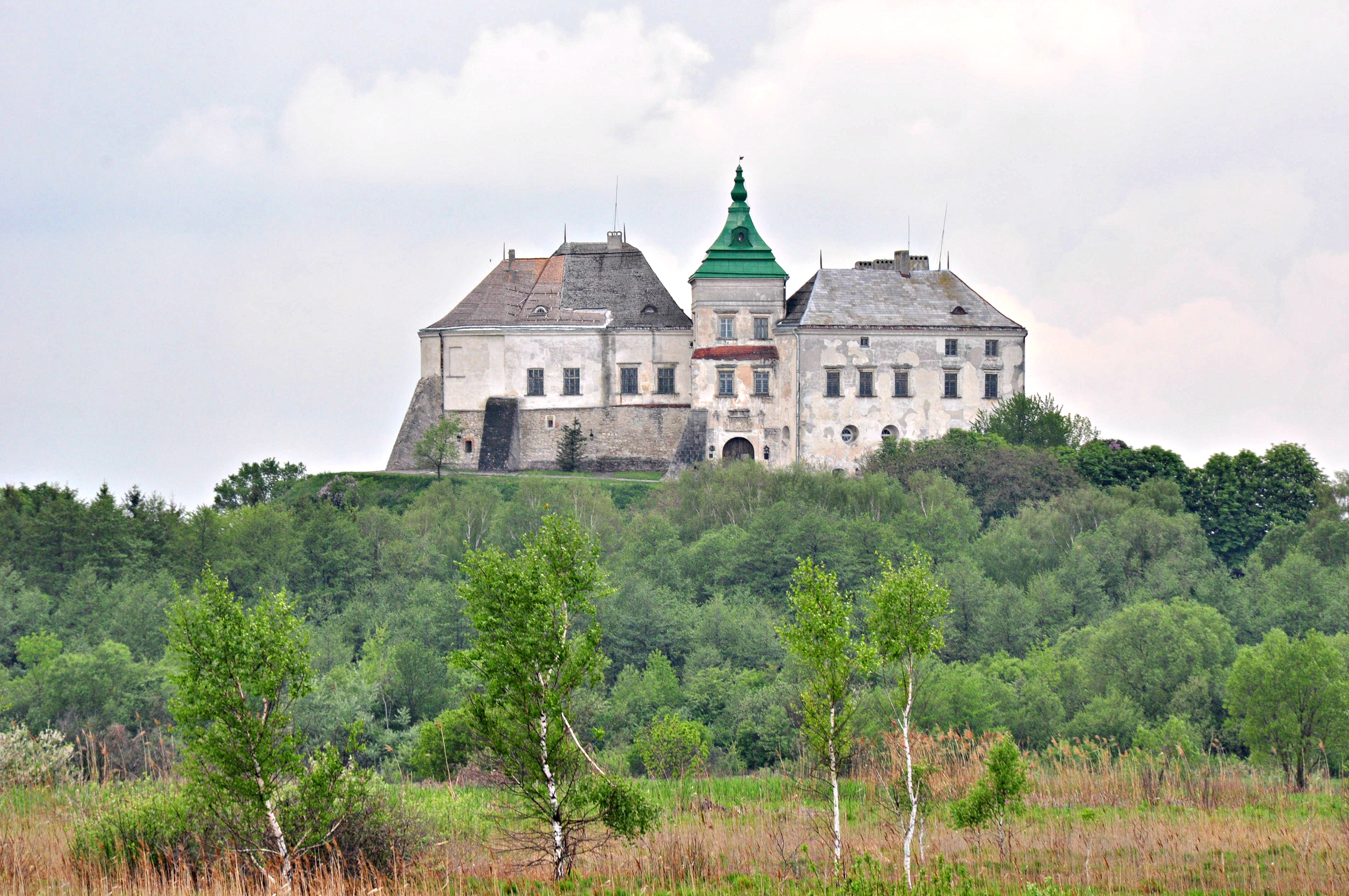
- Olesko Castle in Ukraine.

Site information
- Type: Castle
- Open to the public: yes
- Condition: Survives in good condition.

Location
- Coordinates: 49.968336°N 24.900556°E

Site history
- Built: 15th to 17th centuries

Immovable Monument of National Significance of Ukraine
- Official name: Замок Даниловичів (Castle of the Danylovych family)
- Type: Architecture
- Reference no.: 130072

The Olesko Castle (Ukrainian: Олеський замок, romanized: Oles'kyi zamok; Polish: Zamek w Olesku) is located within the borders of present-day Zolochiv Raion in Ukraine. The first historical records of the castle are in a document dated 1390, when Pope Boniface IX gave Olesko and Tustan to a Catholic bishop of Halych. It is located about seventy-five kilometers from Lviv, the largest city in western Ukraine.

== Location ==
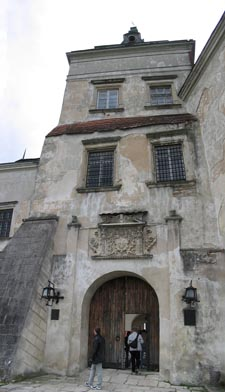
Entrance to Olesko Castle.

Olesko Castle, oval in shape, stands on top of a small hill, about fifty meters in height. A moat and a wall surrounds it, which serves as a defence for the castle. The castle is also surrounded by a dense swamp. The land that the castle sat on changed ownership many times. It was originally on the border of land of Volhynia and land of Lviv.

The castle was, at different times, owned by Poland, Lithuania, and Hungary. It became a political landmark in the 14th century when movable borders between the three aforementioned countries ran through its territory. Battles for ownership of the castle were constant. A deep well in the basement of the castle was used as an escape route for besieged inhabitants.

== Inhabitants ==
In the 15th century, the castle was changed from being a defense point, to simply a getaway for aristocracy.

In 1605, the castle was bought by the nobleman Jan Daniłowicz h. Sas, a wealthy local landowner and Voivode of the Ruthenian Voivodeship. It was then sold to the family of Koniecpolski. The new owners, whose main residence was in Zhovkva, treated the castle poorly, and only in 1682 the castle was renovated by Jan III Sobieski, who bought the complex from Stanislaw Koniecpolski for 400,000 zlotys. In early 18th century, Olesko was bought by the family of Rzewuski, and its collection of antiques was moved to another castle the Rzewuscy owned, Pidhirtsi Castle.

The castle is perhaps most famous for being the birthplace of the Polish king Jan III Sobieski, the hero of the Battle of Vienna. He often lived there, and collected many of the artworks displayed in the present-day museum. Another Polish king, King Michał Korybut Wiśniowiecki, was also born here. It is also said that Bohdan Khmelnytskyi, the most prominent leaders of Ukrainian Cossacks spent his childhood years here.

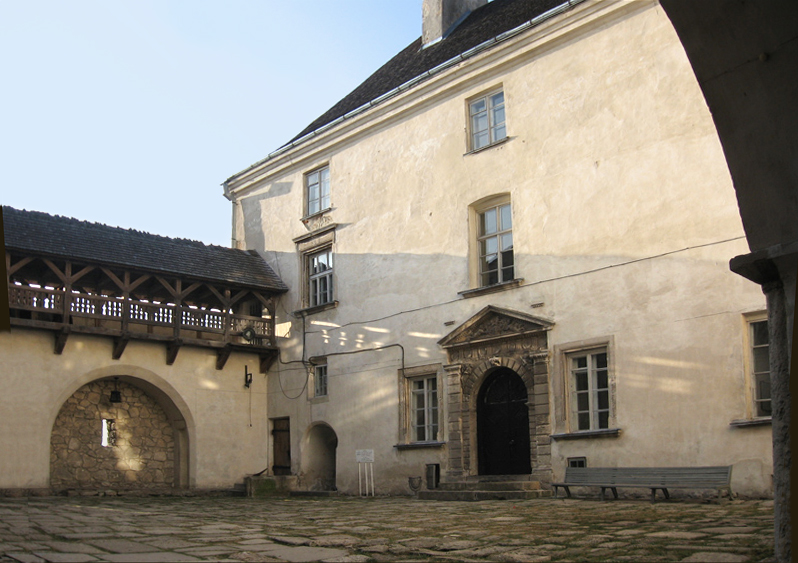
Interior Courtyard of Olesko Castle.

== Restorations ==
The castle was restored in the late 16th to the early 17th centuries. Paintings and mosaics were brought in to decorate the different rooms of the castle. The castle was remodeled in the Italian Renaissance style, which was popular at that time.

In 1838, an earthquake rocked the castle, partly destroying some areas. In 1882, the castle, regarded as a Polish national monument was bought by the Committee of Preservation of the Olesko Castle, which led to a restoration in 1892. Both World War I and World War II affected the castle negatively, undoing previous restoration work. In 1956, the castle was struck by lightning.

The castle was restored again, beginning in 1961 and lasting until 1985. Today, it is a museum, displaying the collections of antique furnishings and art dating from the 16th-17th centuries. It also features sculptures, paintings, still lives, applied arts, tapestries, period weapons, and objects used in everyday life at the time. Its collection is regarded as one of the richest treasury of Polish art outside borders of Poland.

The castle is a part of the "Golden Horseshoe", a ring of three castles nearby each other: Olesko, Pidhirtsi, and Zolochiv Castles.

Paintings from the castle

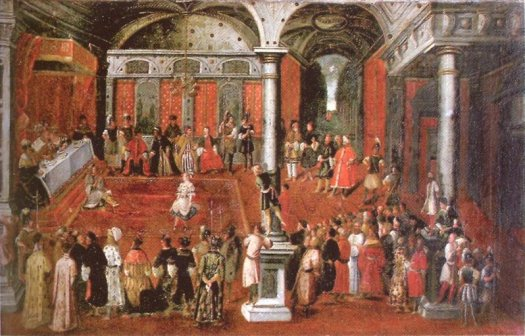
Dance of Salome, Szymon Boguszowicz

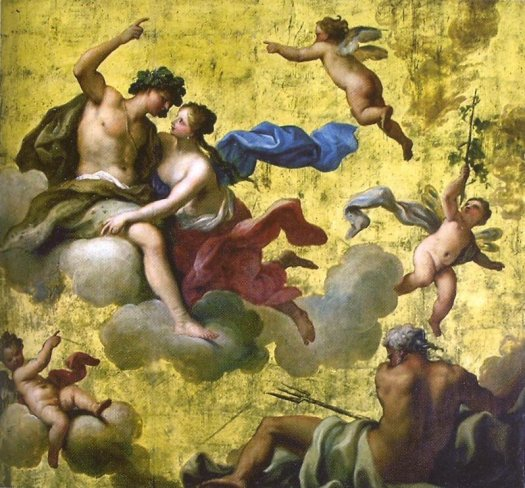
Bacchus and Ariadne, Jerzy Siemiginowski-Eleuter

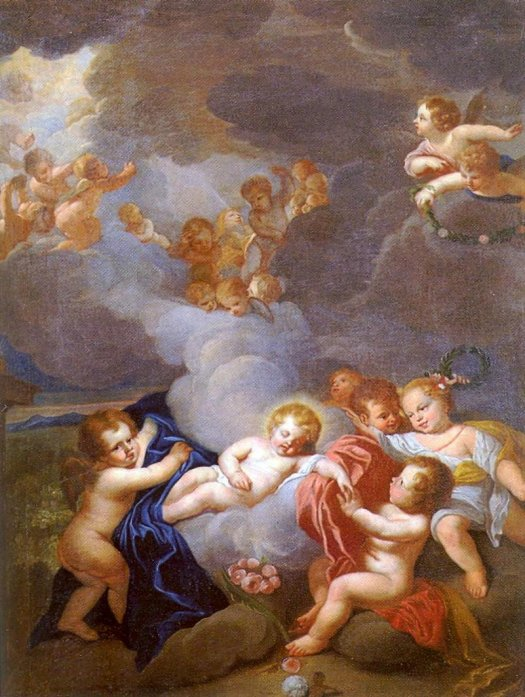
The Christ Child sleeping among angels, Szymon Czechowicz

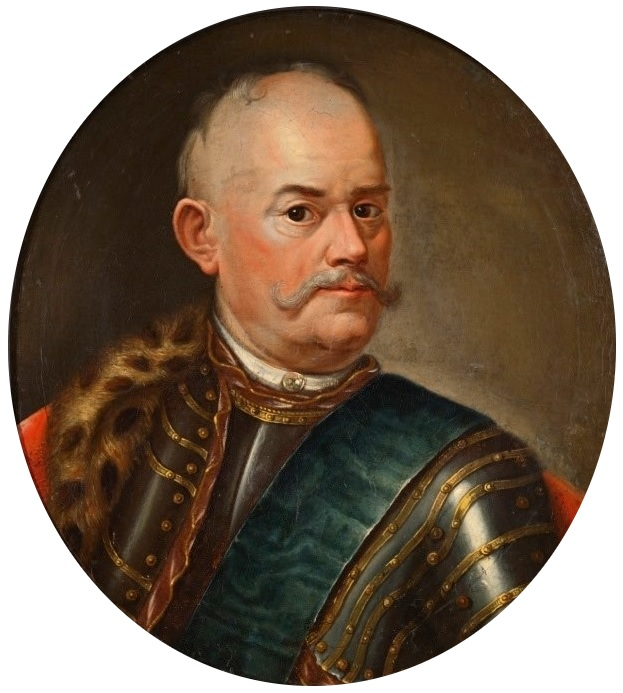
Portrait of Michał Józef Rzewuski, Marcello Bacciarelli

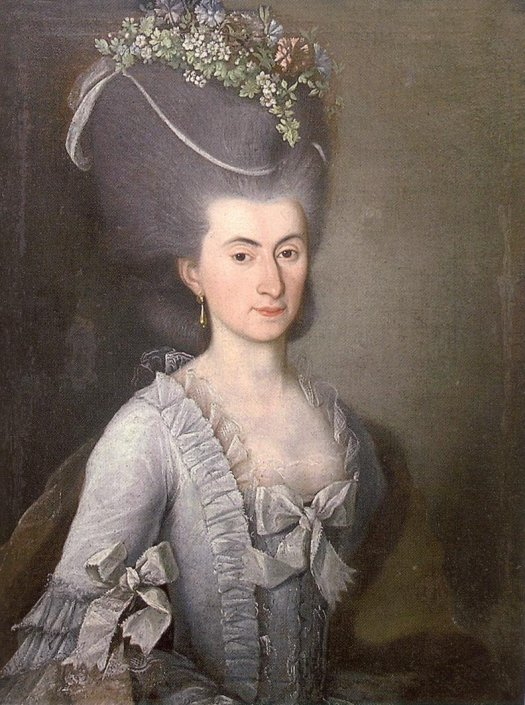
Portrait of a lady, Józef Chojnicki

== In philately and numismatics ==
On June 9, 2017, the national postal operator Ukrposhta put into circulation a postage stamp "Olesky Castle of the XIII-XVIII centuries" with a face value of UAH 5.80. The stamp, which was issued under the C.E.P.T. program, represented Ukraine in the annual postage stamp rating conducted by the association of European postal operators PostEurop.

On August 17, 2021, the National Bank of Ukraine put into circulation a 10-hryvnia silver commemorative coin "Olesky Castle". It belongs to the series "Architectural Monuments of Ukraine"

== See also ==
- List of castles in Ukraine
