= Zofia Żółkiewska =

Polish noblewoman (c. 1590 – 1634)

- Coat of arms: Lubicz
- Full name: Zofia z Żółkiewskich Daniłowiczowa
- Born: c. 1590
- Died: 20 August 1634
- Family: Żółkiewski
- Consort: Jan Daniłowicz
- Issue: Zofia Teofila Daniłowiczówna; Stanisław Daniłowicz; Jan Daniłowicz; Dorota Daniłowiczówna
- Father: Stanisław Żółkiewski
- Mother: Regina Herburt

Zofia Żółkiewska (c. 1590–1634) was a Polish noblewoman, daughter of Great Hetman of the Crown Stanisław Żółkiewski and grandmother of King Jan III Sobieski.

In 1605 she married the voivode of the Ruthenian Voivodship Jan Daniłowicz and had four children:

- Zofia Teofila - mother of King of Poland Jan III Sobieski
- Stanisław (d. 1636) - killed by Tatars
- Jan (b. 1613, d. 1618)
- Dorota - Benedictine Abbess in Lwów since 1640

== Bibliography ==
- Tadeusz Korzon, Dola i niedola Jana Sobieskiego, Kraków 1898, Tablica I. (Wielkopolska Biblioteka Cyfrowa)
- de Battaglia O. F., Ze studiów genealogicznych nad epoką Jana III Sobieskiego [w:] Miesięcznik Heraldyczny. Organ Polskiego Towarzystwa Heraldycznego wydawany przez Oddział Warszawski. R.12 1933 nr 9, Warszawa 1933, s. 133. (Wielkopolska Biblioteka Cyfrowa)
