= Danilowitz =

Danilowitz or Danilovitz (Yiddish: דאַנילאָוויץ) is the Yiddish spelling of the Polish surname Danilowicz. Notable people with the surname include:

- Jonathan Danilowitz (1945–2022), Israeli LGBT activist
- Pinky Danilowitz, South African international bowls player
