= Halych Land (ziemia) =

Region of the Kingdom of Poland

Coordinates: 49°07′29″N 24°43′43″E

Halych Land Ziemia Halicka Галицька Земля
- Land of Kingdom of Poland
- 1349–1772
- Flag
- Capital: Halych
- History
  - Established: 1349
  - Creation of Ruthenian Voivodeship: 1434
  - Disestablished: 1772
- Political subdivisions: 3 Powiats
Preceded by	Succeeded by
Galicia-Volhynia	Kingdom of Galicia and Lodomeria

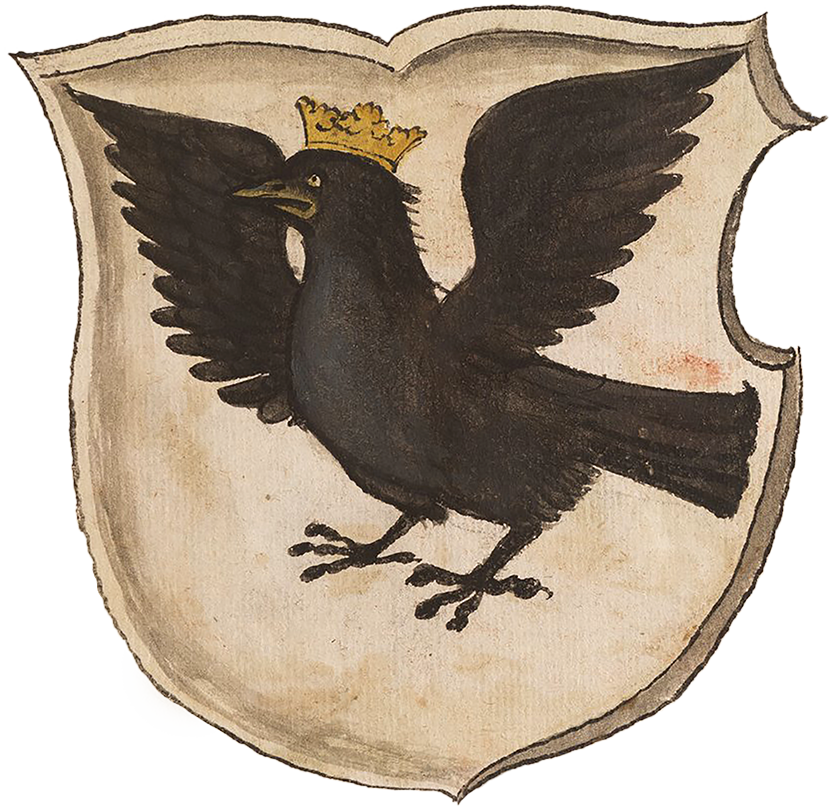
Crowned jackdaw coat-of-arms of the historical region of Halych land

Flag of Halych land at the Battle of Grunwald 1410

Halych land (Polish: ziemia halicka, Ukrainian: Галицька земля) was an historical administrative region (Polish: ziemia) of the Kingdom of Poland which existed from 1349 during the reign of king Casimir III the Great. Its legal system was based on Magdeburg rights, civil law from the 15th century was based on the Statutes of Casimir the Great and the judicial province was Lesser Poland. Its capital city was the urban centre of Halych (Polish: Halicz). From 1434 to 1772 Halych land was one of five regions of the Ruthenian Voivodeship in the Crown of the Kingdom of Poland until the First Partition of Poland.

== Administrative division ==
Halych land was divided into three Powiats (counties)

Counties

- Powiat Halicz (Powiat halicki), chief urban centre Halych (Halicz), from 1564 seat of the sejmik
- Powiat Kołomyja (Powiat kołomyjski), chief urban centre Kolomyia (Kołomyja)
- Powiat Trembowla (Powiat trembowelski), chief urban centre Terebovlia (Trembowla) until 1569

Royal castellans (starostwo grodowe) were in Halych and Terebovlia. Each county (powiat) also elected two deputies to the Polish Crown Tribunal and the Crown Tax Tribunal. The castellan of Halych was responsible for calling the assembly of all the Galicia nobility of Halych land near Halych. The local parliament assembly (Polish: sejmik) were first held in Sudova Vyshnia (Polish: Sądowa Wisznia) and from 1564 it was located in Halych.

There was also subordinate district royal administrative officials starostas (starostwo niegrodowe) located at:

Districts

- Kolomyia
- Bucniów
- Tlumach
- Rohatyn
- Kalush
- Yabluniv
- Sniatyn
- Solotvyn (also known temporarily as Krasnapolsky)
- Mogielnica Stara

According to the royal inspection carried out in 1677, there were 38 towns and 565 villages in the region of Halych land.

== See also ==
- Principality of Halych
- Galicia (Eastern Europe)
- Pokucie
- Red Ruthenia
- Kingdom of Galicia–Volhynia
- Roman Catholic Archdiocese of Halyč

== Sources ==
- Lustracja województwa ruskiego, podolskiego i bełskiego, 1564–1565 Warszawa, (I) 2001, ss. 289. ISBN 83-7181-193-4
- Lustracje dóbr królewskich XVI-XVIII wieku. Lustracja województwa ruskiego 1661–1665. Część III ziemie halicka i chełmska. Polska Akademia Nauk – Instytut Historii. 1976
- Lustracje województw ruskiego, podolskiego i bełskiego 1564–1565, wyd. K. Chłapowski, H. Żytkowicz, cz. 1, Warszawa – Łódź 1992
