= Teofila Zofia Sobieska =

Polish noblewoman (1607–1661)

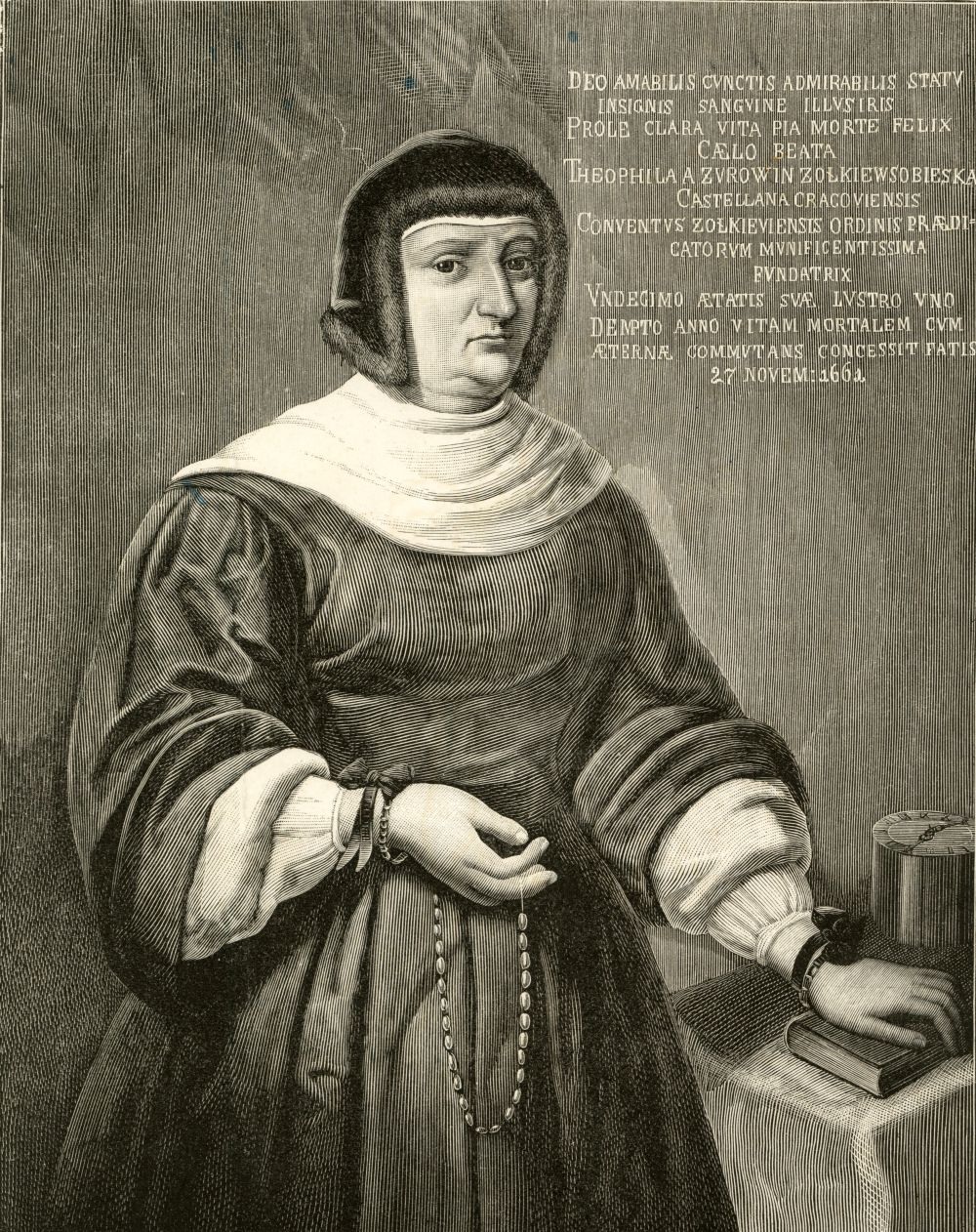
- Coat of arms: Sas
- Full name: Zofia Teofila z Daniłowiczów Sobieska
- Born: 1607; Żurów, Poland (now Ukraine)
- Died: 27 November 1661; Zhovkva, Poland (now Ukraine)
- Family: Daniłowicz
- Consort: Jakub Sobieski h. Janina
- Father: Jan Daniłowicz h. Sas
- Mother: Zofia Żółkiewska h. Lubicz

Teofila Zofia Sobieska, née Daniłowicz (Polish: Daniłowiczówna) (1607 – 27 November 1661) was a Polish noblewoman (szlachcianka), mother of Jan III Sobieski, King of Poland.

Zofia Teofila was the daughter of Voivode of Ruthenia Jan Daniłowicz and Zofia Żółkiewska, the daughter of Hetman Stanisław Żółkiewski h. Lubicz.

== Marriage and issue ==
She married the Voivode of Bełz and Ruthenia, Jakub Sobieski h. Janina on 16 May 1627 in Żółkiew. They had seven children:

1. Marek Sobieski – Rotmistrz, starost of Krasnystaw
2. Jan III Sobieski – King of Poland
3. Katarzyna Sobieska – wife of Władysław Dominik Zasławski and Michał Kazimierz Radziwiłł, mother of Karol Stanisław Radziwiłł
4. Anna Rozalia Sobieska – Benedictine nonne in Lwów
5. Zofia Sobieska – died in childhood
6. Stanisław – died in childhood
7. Stanisław Michał – died in childhood

== Bibliography ==
- Gąsiorowski, Stefan (1999–2000). "Teofila Zofia Sobieska". Polski Słownik Biograficzny. Vol. 39. Polska Akademia Nauk & Polska Akademia Umiejętności.
- Skrzypietz Aleksandra (2005). "Teofila z Daniłłowiczów Sobieska – "nie białogłowskiego, ale męskiego serca" niewiasta" (PDF). Wschodni Rocznik Humanistyczny. 2. Radzyńskie Stowarzyszenie Inicjatyw Lokalnych: 29–53.
