= Mikołaj Daniłowicz =

Polish-Lithuanian nobleman and politician

- Coat of arms: Sas
- Born: c. 1558
- Died: 30 May 1624
- Family: Daniłowicz
- Consort: Helena Uchańska h. Radwan
- Issue: Piotr Daniłowicz; Jan Daniłowicz; Franciszek Daniłowicz; Zofia Daniłowicz; Stanislaw Daniłowicz; Mikolaj Daniłowicz; Izabela Daniłowicz; Anna Daniłowicz
- Father: Stanisław Daniłowicz
- Mother: Katarzyna Tarło

Mikołaj Daniłowicz (c. 1558 – 30 May 1624) was a Polish–Lithuanian nobleman and politician. He was Castellan of Lviv from 1614, Treasurer of the Crown Court from 1610, Grand Treasurer of the Crown from 1617, Speaker of the Sejm in 1593, amongst many other positions as governors of various states.

Educated in 1581 at the University of Dillingen, he went to Sweden during the rule of Sigismund III Vasa. He took part in the Jan Zamoyski expedition and during the Zebrzydowski rebellion took the side of the ruler. In 1607 he was envoy to Turkey.

In 1621 he erected a manor house in Warsaw, destroyed during the Swedish invasion, and was rebuilt as the Zaluski Library ( Bibliotekę Załuskich).

His son, Jan Mikołaj Daniłowicz, also served as Grand Treasurer of the Crown. His brother Jan Daniłowicz was the grandfather of King Jan III Sobieski.

== Children ==
- Piotr Daniłowicz (c. 1600-1645) – husband of Katarzyna Beata Szamotulska h. Nałęcz and Krystyna Wiśniowiecka h. Korybut
- Jan Mikołaj Daniłowicz (1607-1650) – husband of Elżbieta Opalińska h. Łodzia and Zofia Tęczyńska h. Topór
- Franciszek Daniłowicz (1605-1653) – husband of Katarzyna Sapieha h. Lis
- Zofia Daniłowicz (1637-1681) – wife of Adrian Radzimiński h. Brodzic, Paweł Sapieha h. Lis and Łukasz Opaliński z Bnina h. Łodzia
- Stanisław Daniłowicz (b. 1632) – husband of Marianna Siemaszko h. Łabędź
- Mikołaj Daniłowicz (d. 1676) – husband of Apolinara Niemojewska h. Rola
- Izabela Daniłowicz – wife of Jerzy Ossoliński h. Topór
- Anna Daniłowicz – wife of Kasper Zebrzydowski h. Radwan

== Bibliography ==
- Kazimierz Tyszkowski, Mikołaj Daniłowicz, w: Polski Słownik Biograficzny, Kraków 1938, t. IV, s. 416–417.
