= Denis Zubrytsky =

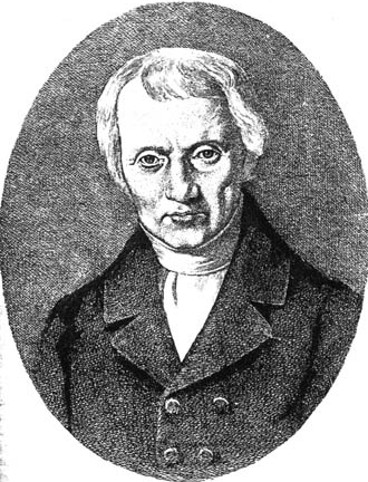
Denis Zubrytsky

Denys Ivanovych Zubrytsky (Ukrainian: Дени́с Іва́нович Зубри́цький, Polish: Dionizy Zubrzycki; 1777 – January 16, 1862), was the first Ukrainian historian in Galicia and a major early figure in the Galician Russophile movement.

== Life ==
Denis Zubrytsky was born in 1777 into a family of Ukrainian nobles. After graduating from Lviv's gymnazium in 1795, he worked as a civil servant. In his youth. he had been pro-Polish, and had even supported Napoleon's invasion of Austria-Hungary; in 1809 he served as a secretary to the pro-French Polish forces who occupied the city. Later in his life, Zubrytsky became very hostile to Polish interests and an ardent supporter of Russophilism. Between 1829 and 1847, he held various positions within the Stauropegion Institute, an important cultural and historical institution in western Ukraine that served as a bastion of Russophilism. He became a corresponding member of the St. Petersburg Archeological Commission in 1842, and a corresponding member of the Russian Academy of Sciences in 1855. In 1843, he was commissioned to organize the Lviv municipal archive.

== Works and ideas ==
Zubrytsky was highly influenced by his friend, Mikhail Pogodin, and his idea that Ukrainians and Russian constituted one nation. During his time Austria and Russia were allies and Zubrytsky idealized Russian autocracy while also being loyal to Austria-Hungary. He opposed the Polish nobility and the Polish domination of Galicia, while also objecting to the abolition of serfdom. Through Zubrytsky's efforts many Galicians, such as Yakiv Holovatsky, one of the members of the Ruthenian Triad, were converted to Russophilism.

Zubrytsky published numerous historical works. His most significant work, written in 1852 and 1855 in Russian, was the History of the Principality of Galicia-Volhynia. He also published articles on Galician folk songs, histories of the Ruthenian people and church figures in medieval times, and other historical articles. According to a letter Zubtrytsky wrote to Mikhail Pogodin, the purpose of his historical research was to acquaint Galicians (western Ukrainians) with Russian history and with the Russian language.
