= Adam Danielewicz =

Polish statistician

Adam Danielewicz (1846–1935) was a Polish statistician.

== Publications ==
- Równania Ablowe oraz ich zastosowanie do wpisywania wielokątów foremnych w koło (1869)
- W kwestyi statystyki śmiertelności (1877)
- O układaniu tablic śmiertelności z powodu zamierzonego spisu ludności (1878)
- W przedmiocie badań tablic śmiertelności (1878)
- Zasady taryf ubezpieczeń życiowych (1878)
- Zabezpieczenie kapitałów przez częściowe oszczędności (1884)
- Z dziedziny statystyki matematycznej (1884)
- Ludność miasta Warszawy w obrazach graficznych. Według spisu jednodniowego z 1882 roku (1887)
- Warszawska śmiertelność według przyczyn śmierci (1889-1893)
- Przyczynek do metody Zeunera (1890)
- Wykup czy redukcya polis (1892)
- Podstawy matematyczne ubezpieczeń życiowych (1896)
- O metodzie najmniejszych kwadratów (1904)
- Zarys arytmetyki politycznej (1910, with Samuelem Dicksteinem)
