= Olesko =

Rural locality in Lviv Oblast, Ukraine

Olesko Олесько
- Rural settlement
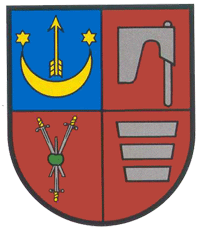
- Symbol of Olesko. 1 Sas, 2 Topór, 3 Herburt, 4 Korczak. Coat of arms of Jan Daniłowicz h. Sas (landowner in 1605), from his mother Katarzyna Tarło/wa h. Topór, and his grandmothers Katarzyna Odnowski/a h. Herburt, and Regina Malczycki/a h. Korczak.

- Location of Olesko within Ukraine Olesko (Ukraine)
- Coordinates: 49°57′47″N 24°53′38″E
- Country: Ukraine
- Oblast: Lviv Oblast
- Raion: Zolochiv Raion
- Hromada: Busk urban hromada

Population (2022)
  - Total: 1,418

Olesko (Ukrainian: Олесько; Polish: Olesko) is a rural settlement in Zolochiv Raion, Lviv Oblast (region) of western Ukraine. It belongs to Busk urban hromada, one of the hromadas of Ukraine. Population: 1,418 (2022 estimate).

== History ==
It was the seat of the rebbes of Alesk, and also the birthplace of Jan III Sobieski, the King of Poland and Grand Duke of Lithuania.

The earliest mentioned Jewish community is in 1500. Olesko was the place of residence of tzadikim in the 19th century. In 1935 its Jewish population was 738.

Until 18 July 2020, Olesko belonged to Busk Raion. The raion was abolished in July 2020 as part of the administrative reform of Ukraine, which reduced the number of raions of Lviv Oblast to seven. The area of Busk Raion was merged into Zolochiv Raion.

Until 26 January 2024, Olesko was designated urban-type settlement. On this day, a new law entered into force which abolished this status, and Olesko became a rural settlement.

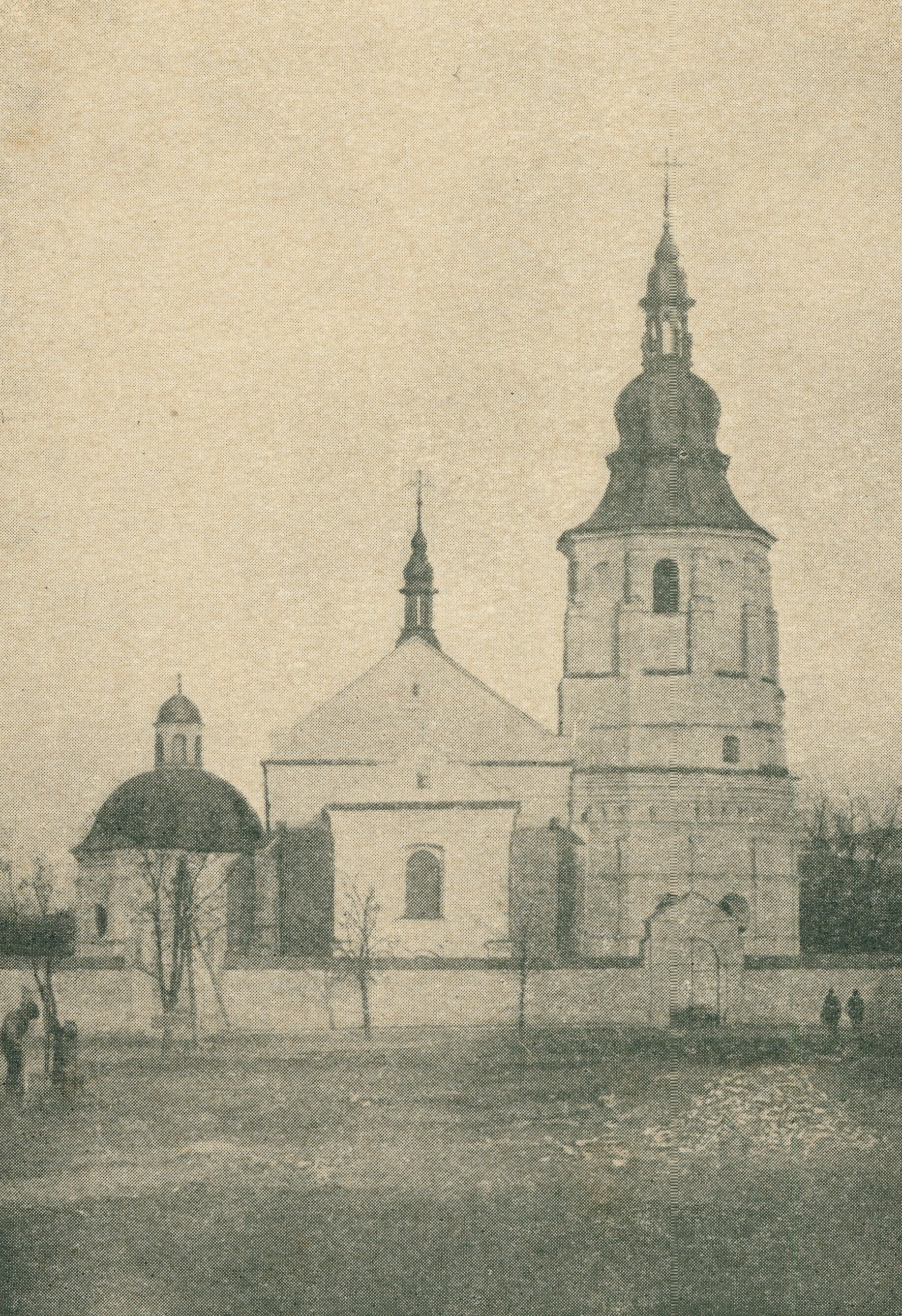
Parish church, circa 1920

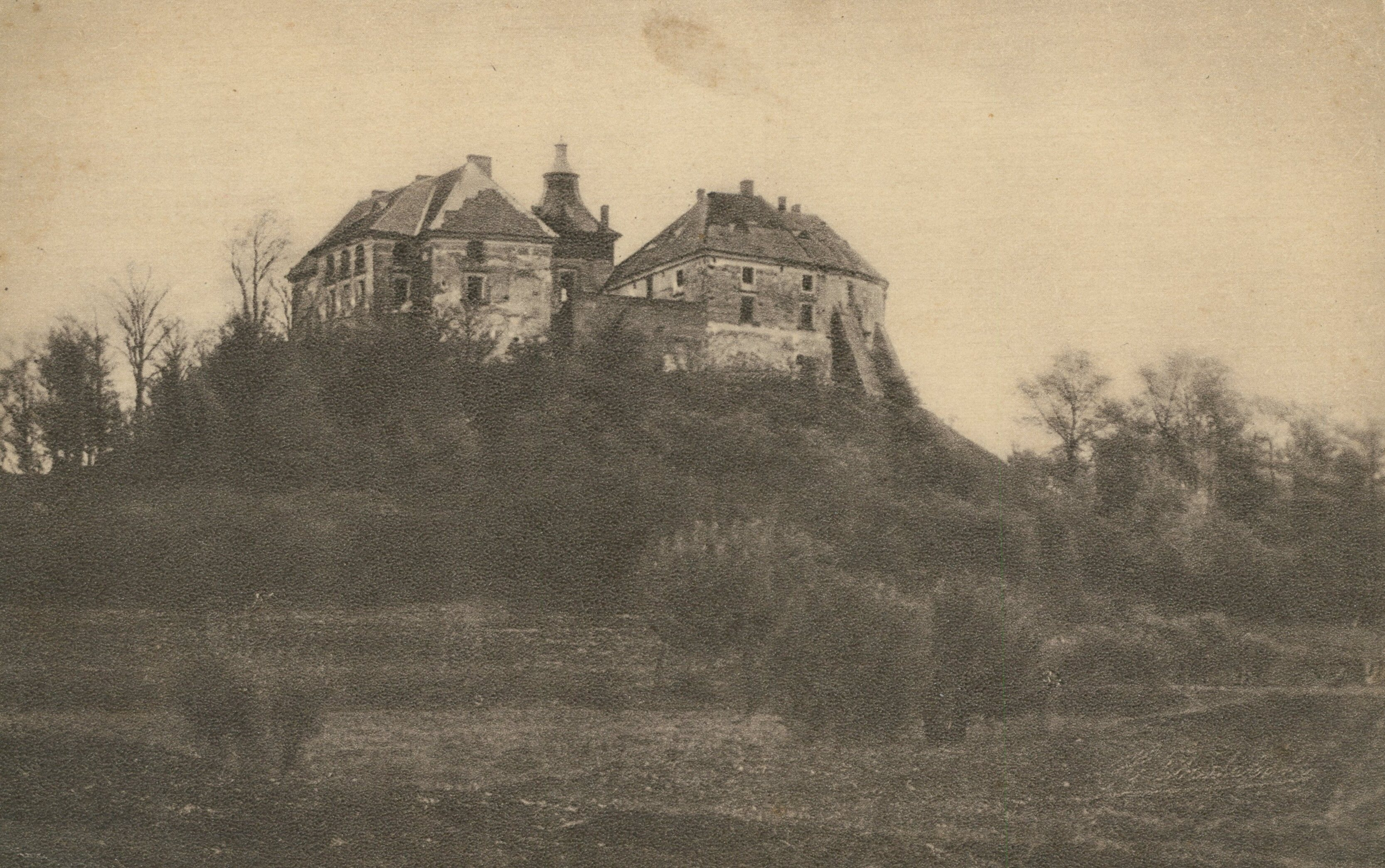
Castle, 1934

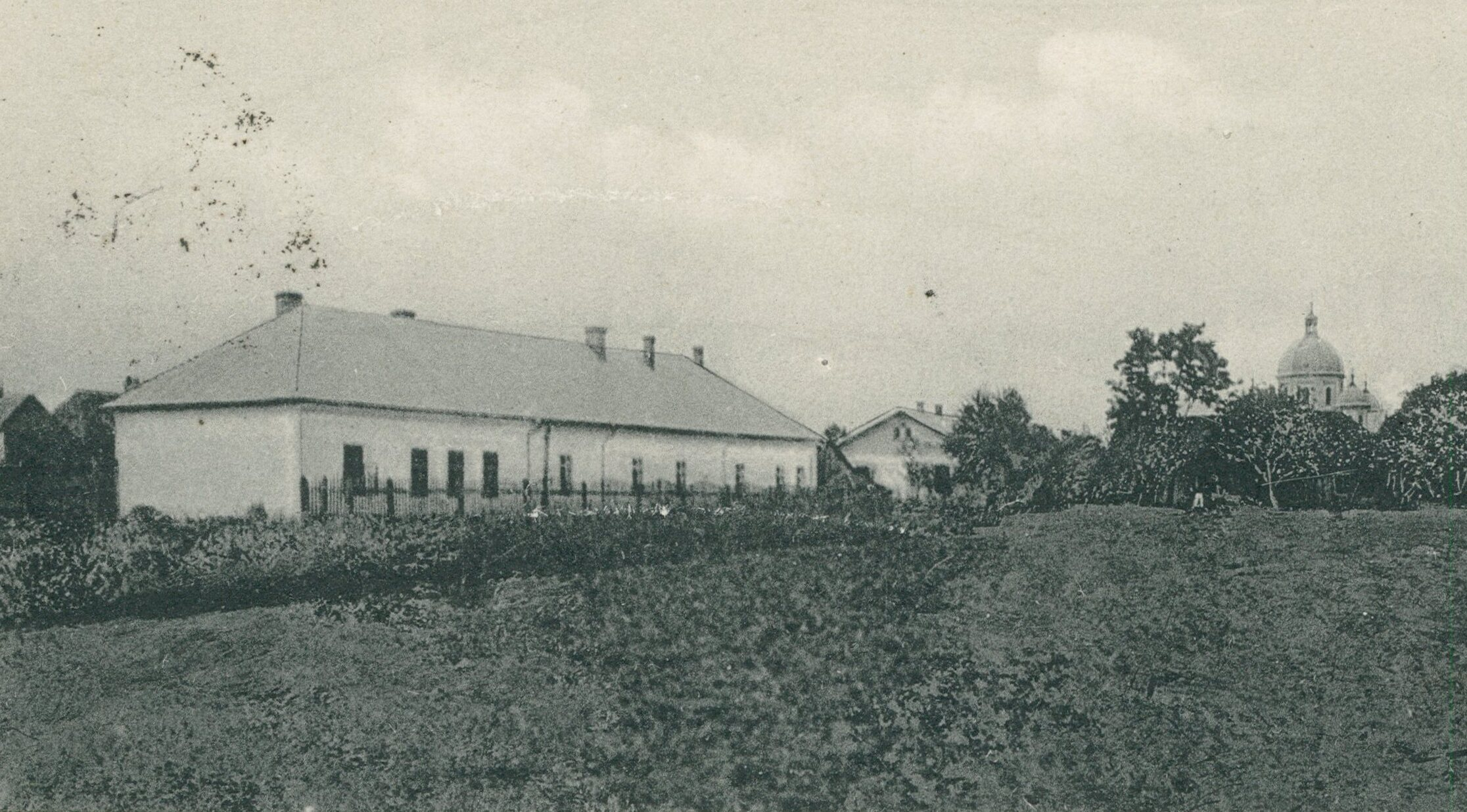
County court and tax office, 1916

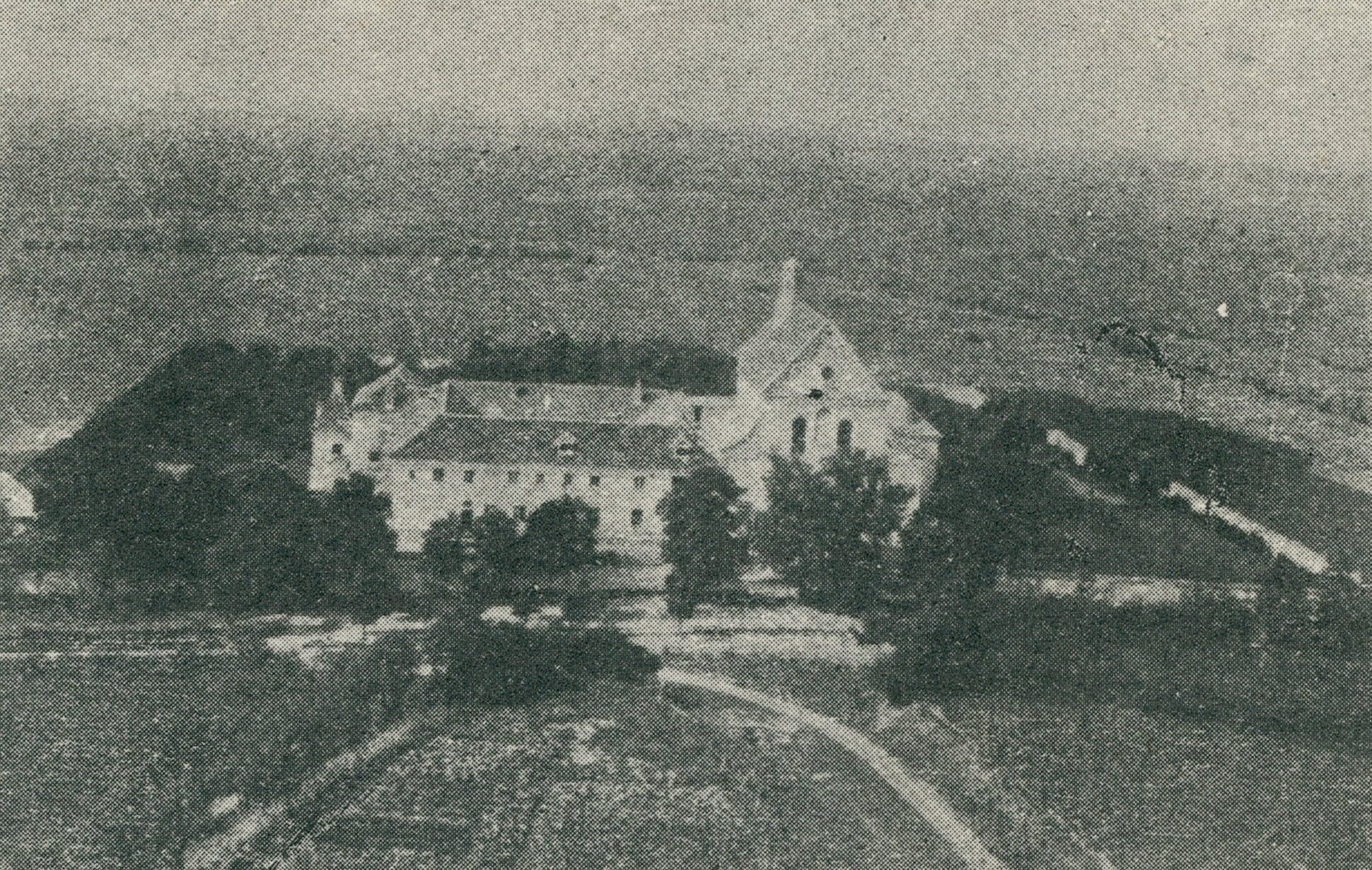
Monastery of Capuchins, circa 1930

== See also ==
- Olesko Castle
