= Gabriel Tęczyński =

Polish noble

Gabriel Tęczyński (1572–1617) was a Polish noble who governed the Lublin Voivode during the Polish–Lithuanian Commonwealth.
