= Danilewicz =

Danielewicz is a Polish-language surname originated in the noble Danielewicz family. It is of patronymic origin, meaning descendants of Daniel or Danilo. Notable people with this surname include:

- Wincenty Danilewicz (1787–1878), Chevau-léger (light-horse cavalryman) in campaigns of the Napoleonic Wars; Secretary of Chancellery of Senate of Poland (Polish: Senat) in Congress Poland; chief archivist of heraldry administration of Congress Poland, in Warsaw.
- Ludomir Danilewicz, Polish engineer, one of the directors of AVA together with Leonard Danilewicz, helped to break the Enigma Code
- Tadeusz Danilewicz, Polish military commander, head of the post-WWII anti-Communist resistance militia, National Military Union (NZW)
- Leonard Danilewicz (1903–1976), Polish engineer
- Kazimierz Danilewicz (1927–2013), Polish sculptor

== See also ==
- Danielewicz families, several Polish noble families
- Ostoja Danielewicz
