= Sas coat of arms =

European coat of arms

Sas (Saxon) coat of arms

Versions
- Gules tincture variation (in Orbis Polonus 1641–43). Referred to as Sas II in Siebmacher's Armorial Book
- Adopted: ca. 13th century
- Shield: gold (Or) crescent with its horns pointed upwards; on each horn a gold (Or) star. In its center a gold (Or) or silver (Argent) arrow pointed upwards.

Sas or Szász (origin: Slavic for 'Saxon'; in Polish: Sas, Hungarian: Szász, Romanian: Saș) is a Central European coat of arms. It was borne since the medieval period by several Transylvanian-Saxon Hungarian, Ruthenian, Ukrainian, and Polish-Lithuanian noble families. The house was once a mighty princely and ducal house with origins in Saxony, Transylvania, Hungary and Ruthenia.

== History ==
Ancient Polish-Lithuanian historians like Szymon Okolski say that the origin of these arms is derived from Saxony, where during the mid-12th century King Géza II of Hungary invited Germanic peoples of Saxony to settle in, establish trading centres and defend relatively sparsely populated Transylvania in the Kingdom of Hungary, upon which the Transylvanian Saxons were later given a privileged status in the "Diploma Andreanum" (Golden Charter of Transylvanian Saxons) issued by King Andrew II of Hungary (see Transylvanian Saxons).

The origins of the dynastic House of Sas or Szász vary depending on the source. According to the chronicles of Albertus Strepa; the outstanding military leader Comes Huyd of Hungary (a Transylvanian-Saxon), entered Galicia in 1236 with his mighty army of allied mounted warrior knights to the service of Daniel of Galicia King of Ruthenia, and each was rewarded with lands in Red Ruthenia that Huyd and his allied noble knights settled, being referred to as the Sas/Szász (Saxon) due to their Transylvanian Saxon dialect and origin.

According to the chronicles of Wojciech Strepa; Comes Huyd [Hujd] of Hungary, having come with his mighty army of allied mounted warrior knights to the service of Lev I of Galicia (1269–1301) the son of Daniel of Galicia King of Ruthenia, and having allied himself with Lithuania, drove the Eastern barbarians out of Mazovia. In reward for his knightly deeds, he was given, among other gifts, Lev's widowed sister-in-law N.N. of Galicia Princess of Kholm as a wife (the widow of Lev's brother Shvarn Daniilovich, sister of Vaišvilkas, daughter of King Mindaugas of Lithuania from the House of Mindaugas) and along with his allied knights lands in the territory of Red Ruthenia that they settled.

Count Huyd, who bore on his coat of arms the blue (azure) escutcheon with the gold (or) crescent, gold stars and gold arrow, and the knights who allied under his battle banner, are said to have been the progenitors of the House of Sas (Szász).

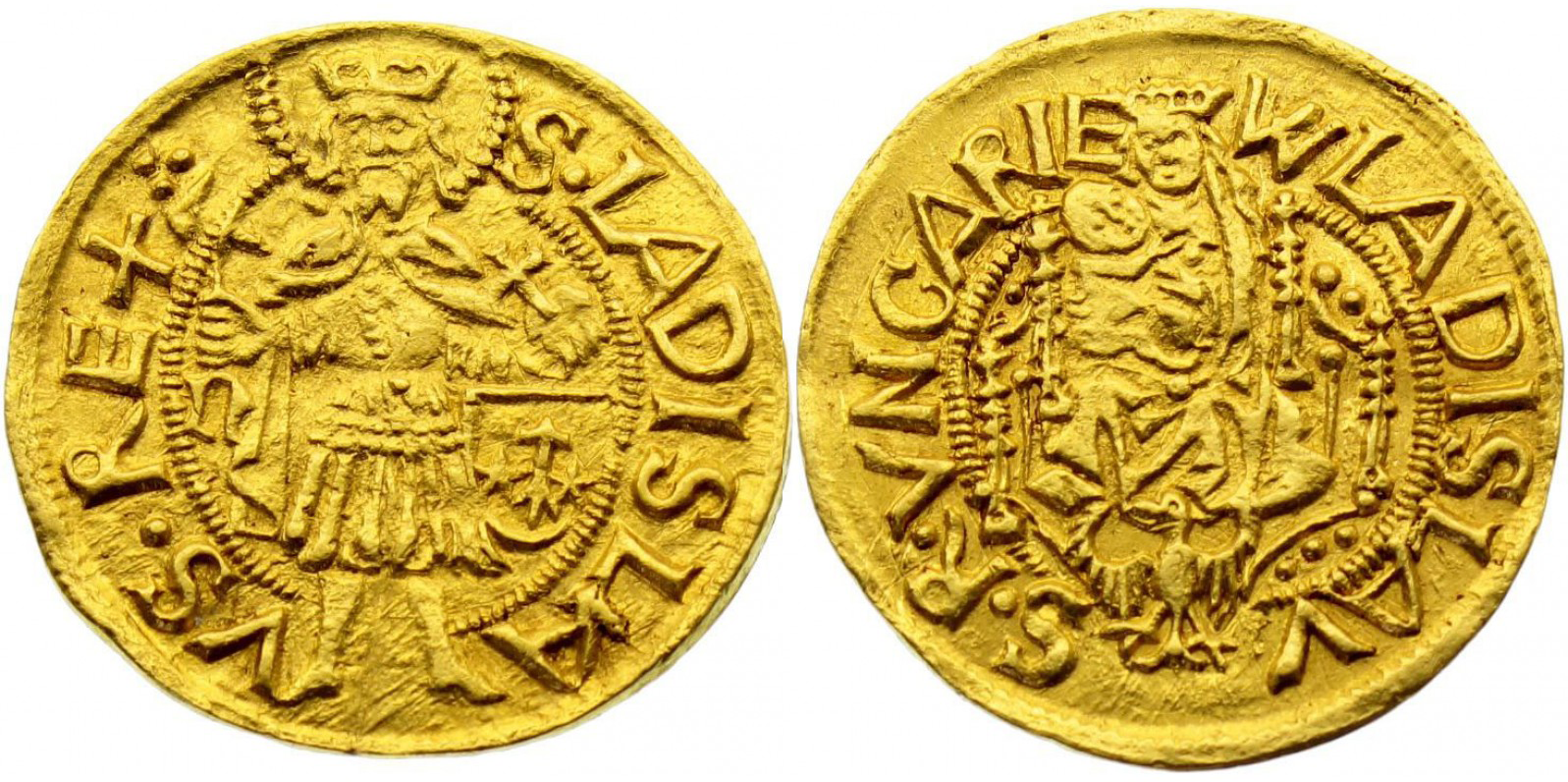
Vladislaus II of Bohemia and Hungary medieval ducat (Magyar aranyforint) gold coin struck in 1491 by the Baia Mare (Nagybánya) mint house in Transylvania. Reverse shows a crowned and nimbate standing figure of Saint Ladislaus I King of Hungary holding a horseman's battle axe and globus cruciger above the below mint mark "n" and mint house (mint master) shield Sas coat of arms of Bartolomeu Drágfi de Beltiug.

Early origins also point to the Hungarian Transylvanian-Saxon Voivodes Dragoş I de Bedeu (Bedő) voivode of Maramureș Prince of Moldavia and his successor son Sas de Beltiug (Hungarian Szász de Béltek) Prince of Moldavia, who bore the blue (azure) escutcheon with the gold crescent, gold stars and gold arrow on their coat of arms. Other notable scions of Dragoş I were Bartolomeu Drágfi of Beltiug (Béltek), Comes Perpetuus of Middle Szolnok (1479–1488), Voivode of Transylvania and Comes of the Székely people (1493–1499), who had distinguished himself earlier as a royal knight of the Hungarian Royal Court defeating the Ottoman Turks at the Battle of Breadfield (1479) together with Pál Kinizsi, István Báthory, Vuk Branković and Basarab Laiotă cel Bătrân. At the time of King Matthias Corvinus' death, Bartholomew Drágfi of Beltiug (Béltek) was among the wealthiest landowners of the country, three castles, two manor houses, eight market towns and about 200 villages were in his property. His estates in Middle Szolnok and Satu Mare included the castles of Chioar and Ardud together with the large lordships surrounding them, and further, the castles of Șoimi and the castellum of Ceheiu. Another important family member, among others, was Ioan Drágfi of Beltiug (Béltek) Comes of Temes County in 1525, who died 1526 in the Battle of Mohács.

Written descriptions of the Sas/Szász coat of arms in classical heraldic references, such as in "Herby rycerstwa polskiego" (1584), "Korona Polska/Herbarz Polski" (1728–1846) and Siebmacher's armorial book on the Hungarian and Transylvanian nobility, describe the arms in blue (azure) tincture, as borne by the families Drágfi (Hungarian patronym for "son of Drag") of Beltiug (Béltek) scions of Dragoş I of Bedeu, Jan Daniłowicz herbu Sas, Dziedoszycki (Dzieduszycki) h. Sas and Berlicz-Strutynskių (Strutyński) h. Sas. Some families, however, bear this coat of arms on a red (gules) tincture field, in "Orbis Polonus" (1641–43) the Sas clan arms is described as being of "sanguineus" Latin for "blood red" tincture, such as borne by the Counts Komarnicki herbu Sas family in the Kingdom of Galicia and Lodomeria.

== Blazon ==
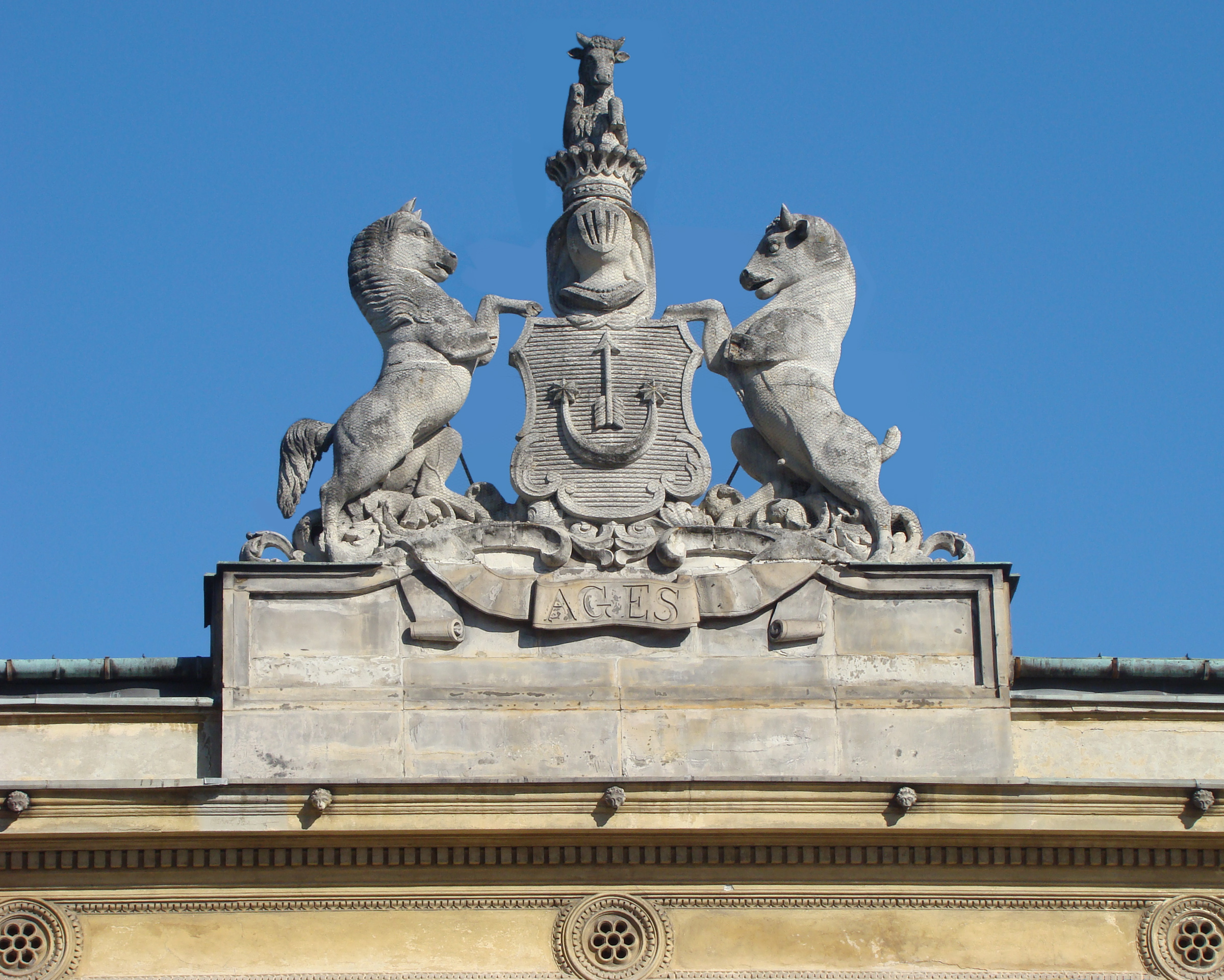
Sas coat of arms on the central facade of Uruski Palace, Warsaw, which now forms the University of Warsaw.

In 1843 the former palace became the property of Count Seweryn Uruski herbu Sas (1817–1890), marshal of the nobility of Warsaw Province, privy counselor of the Imperial Court and president of the College of Arms of the Polish Kingdom, who demolished the former palace and commissioned architect Andrzej Gołoński to design and raise a new palace in its place with Renaissance architecture. The sculptor Ludwika Kaufman was commissioned to carve the Sas coat of arms in reverence of the great progenitors of the Sas (Saxon) house. After the death of Seweryn Uruski in 1890 the palace became the property of his wife Countess Ermancja Tyzenhauz h. Bawół, then his youngest surviving issue Countess Maria Uruska h. Sas (1860–1931) who married Vladimir Światopełk-Czetwertyński.

Burned during World War II by the occupying German forces in the Warsaw Uprising, the palace remained in the ownership of the Światopełk-Czetwertyński family until 1947, then passed into the possession of the University of Warsaw. During the years 1948–1951 the palace was restored by the architect Jan Dąbrowski. Today it houses the Department of Geography and Regional Studies.

=== Other blazon images ===
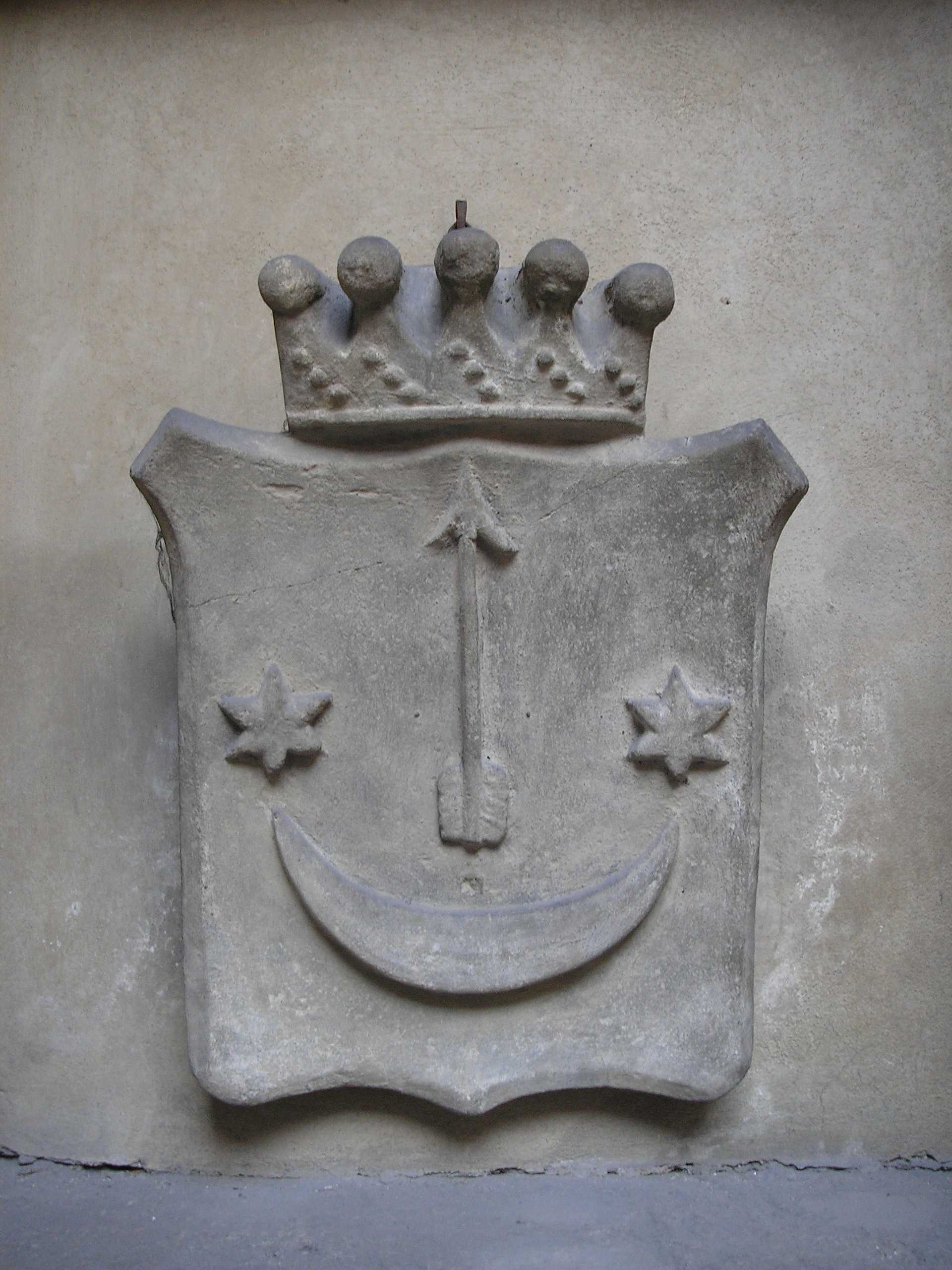
Sas coat of arms depicted in the 14th-century Collegium Maius courtyard, first university of Poland, the oldest building of Jagiellonian University in Kraków Old Town

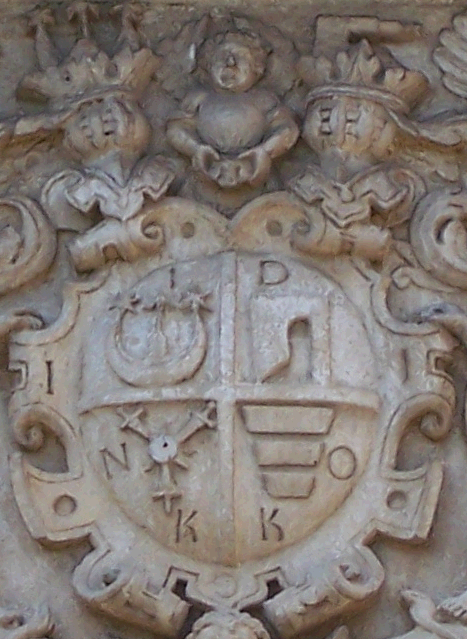
Coat of arms at the entrance of Olesko Castle. Quarterly coat of arms of Jan Daniłowicz h. Sas, Duke of the Duchy of Ruthenia (Ruthenian Voivodeship), and landowner of Olesko in 1605

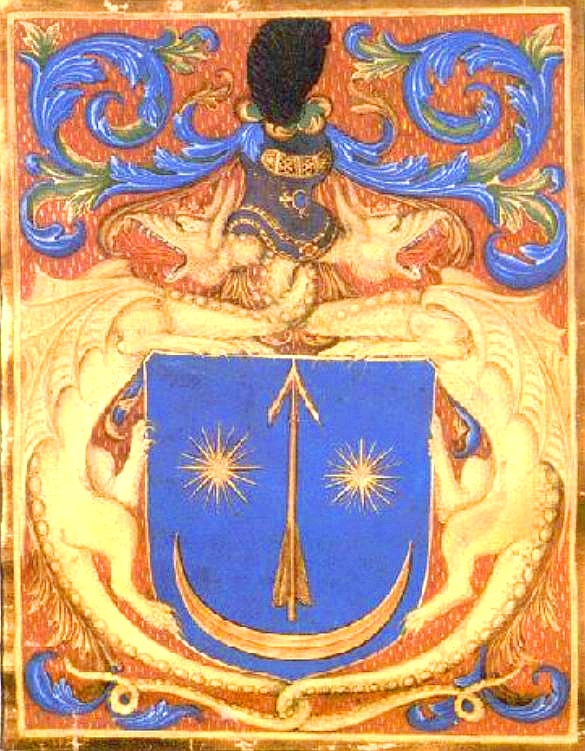
Coat of arms of the Transylvanian-Saxon family Drágfi de Beltiug (Hungarian Drágffy de Béltek) scions of Dragoş I of Bedeu

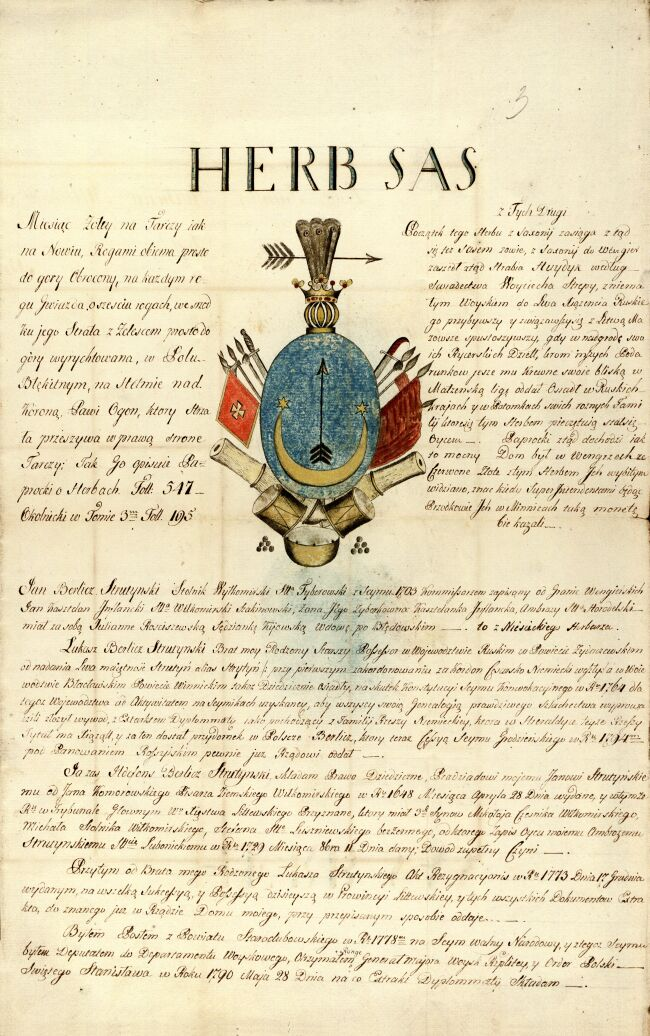
Sas coat of arms 1797 document of the Berlicz-Strutynskių (Strutyński) h. Sas family of Utena, Grand Duchy of Lithuania (document held at the Lithuanian State Historical Archives).

Sas coat of arms in red "Gules" tincture of the Komarnicki herbu Sas house

Baron Błażowski h. Sas coat of arms

== Bearers, family members of the House of Sas ==
The following family names are listed in the classical genealogical and heraldic reference "Korona Polska/Herbarz Polski (Crown of Poland/Polish Armorial) 1728–1846" authored by heraldist Kasper Niesiecki: Baczyński, Bandrowski, Baraniecki, Bereznicki, Biliński, Błazowski, Bojarski, Bratkowski, Bryliński, Brześciański, Buchowski, Chodakowski, Czołhański, Czolowski/Czolowscy, Daniłowicz, Długopolski, Dobrzański, Dubrawski, Dziedoszycki, Dziedziel, Hoszowski, Hrebnicki, Huhernicki, Jamiński, Jasiński, Jaworski, Kłodnicki, Komarnicki, Kropiwnicki, Kruszelnicki, Kulczycki, Lityński, Łucki, Mańczak, Manesterski, Matkowski, Mikulski, Mściszewski, Nowosielski, Odrzechowski, Orłowski, Podwysocki, Raszkowski, Rześniowiecki, Rosźniatowski, Rudnicki, Siemiasz, Skotnicki, Strutyński, Strzelbicki, Sulatycki, Świstelnicki, Tarnawski, Tatomir, Terlecki, Tesmer, Tyssarowski, Uniatycki, Winnicki, Wisłocki, Witwicki, Wołkowicki, Wołosiecki, Woryski, Wysoczanski (Wytag z metryk Stanow Krol.Galic i Lodom.), Zapłatyński, Zawisza, Zeliborski, Zesteliński, Zurakowski, Żukotyński.

According to addendum added to "Herbarz Polski" by the 19th-century editor and publisher Bobrowicz, other authors, like Duńczewski, Kuropatnicki, Małachowski, Wielądek, assign the Sas coat of arms to the following noble families:" Brzuski, Charewicz, Husarzewski, Kumarnicki, Nechrebecki, Obertynski, Olewnicki, Pochorecki, Popiel, Sasimowski, Sasowski, Tyzdrowski. Bearers mentioned in other sources include: Uruski and Knihinicki.

According to Aleksander Czolowski as well as Kasper Niesecki and Bobrowicz, Nanowski. <http://bcpw.bg.pw.edu.pl/Content/962/herbarz_t2_hpii.pdf></Herbarz polski Kaspra Niesieckiego, S. J. Powiększony dodatkami z ..., Volume 10>

=== Notable individuals ===
Notable bearers of this coat of arms include:

- House of Dragoș
- Baczewski family
- Leon Biliński
- Daniłowicz family
  - Roman Danylovich (Prince of Black Ruthenia)
  - Jan Daniłowicz, grandfather of King Jan III Sobieski
  - Teofila Zofia Sobieska née Daniłowicz, mother of King Jan III Sobieski
  - Mikołaj Daniłowicz
- Albin Dunajewski
- Józef Dwernicki
- Jadwiga Dzieduszycka
- Włodzimierz Dzieduszycki
- Jerzy Franciszek Kulczycki
- Jan Sas-Zubrzycki
- Seweryn Uruski
- Tadeusz Żukotyński Polish count and painter

http://www.poles.org/db/Z_names/Zukotynski_T.html

- Józef Sas-Czułowski, Polish captain who fought in the Battle of Somosierra and was Adjutant to Jan Nepomucen Dziewanoski.
- Dr Mieczyslaw Jan de Sas Kropiwnicki (1912-1971): The first Polish veterinarian to perform a caesarean section on a brood mare http://www.medycynawet.edu.pl/archives/423/6495-summary-med-weter-77-02-6495-2021

Note: as name spellings were fairly fluid between local vernaculars spoken and written in past history throughout the Slavic-speaking states or central Europe region, so differences in name spellings exist from one place to another.

== Related coat of arms ==
- Frampol town in Lublin Voivodeship (the eastern part of the province was historically part of Red Ruthenia)
- Sasiv (Polish Sasów/Sassów) town in Ukraine (historically in the Ruthenian Voivodeship of the Crown of the Kingdom of Poland)

=== Derivative coat of arms ===
Sas II

Biliński family coat of arms, a variant of Sas.

Coat of arms of the Garczyński clan, an upside-down variety of Sas.

== See also ==
- Sas II Coat of Arms
- Polish heraldry
- Heraldic family
- Sarmatism
- List of rulers of Moldavia
- Olesko Castle
- History of Transylvania
- History of Maramureș
- Lands of the Crown of Saint Stephen
- Ruthenian nobility
- Lithuanian nobility
- Ukrainian nobility of Galicia (Western Ukraine)

== Literature ==
- von Czergheö, Nagy (1885–1893). Siebmacher's großes Wappenbuch, Band 4, Der Adel von Ungarn samt den Nebenländern der St. Stephanskrone [Siebmacher's Great Armorial Book, Vol. 4, The Nobility of Hungary inclusive the Lands of the Crown of Saint Stephen] (in German). Nürnberg: Bauer & Raspe.
- von Reichenau; von Czergheö; von Bárczay (1898). Siebmacher's großes Wappenbuch, Band 4, Der Adel von Siebenbürgen [Siebmacher's Great Armorial Book, Vol. 4, The Nobility of Transylvania] (in German). Nürnberg: Bauer & Raspe.
- Kovács, András (2012). Institutional Structures and Elites in Sălaj Region and in Transylvania in the 14th–18th Centuries (PDF). Vol. XXI, Supplement No. 2. Cluj-Napoca: Romanian Academy, Centre for Transylvanian Studies. pp. 43–45, 110.
- HERBARZ POLSKI Kaspra Niesieckiego S.J. (English Polish Armorial – Kaspra Niesieckiego S.J.), Author: Kasper Niesiecki, Publisher: Jan Nepomucen Bobrowicz, Breitkopf & Härtel, Lipsku (Leipzig), 1841, Vol. 8, p. 284–285. (in Polish)
- ORBIS POLONUS, Tom III, (Simple English Armorial of Polish nobility, Volume 3), Author: Szymon Okolski, 1641–43, Kraków, p. 195–202. (in Latin)
- Herby rycerstwa polskiego (English Coat of Arms of Polish Nobility), Author: Bartosz Paprocki, Publisher: Biblioteka Polska, 1584 Kraków, reprinted 1858 Kraków, reprinted 1982 Warsaw, p. 695–697 (in Polish)
- Małachowski herbu Nałęcz, Piotr (1805). Zbiór nazwisk szlachty z opisem herbów własnych familiom zostaiącym w Królestwie Polskim i Wielkim ięstwie Litewskim [A collection of the names of the nobility, descriptions of their coats of arms and heraldic clan in the Polish Kingdom and the Grand Duchy of Lithuania] (in Polish). Trynitarzow: w Drukarni J. C. K. Mci, XX.
- Ludwik Wyrostek: Ród Dragów – Sasów na Węgrzech i Rusi Halickiej, Kraków, 1932. (in Polish)
- Franciszek Piekosiński: Heraldyka polska wieków średnich, Kraków, 1899. (in Polish)
- Tadeusz Gajl: Herbarz polski od średniowiecza do XX wieku : ponad 4500 herbów szlacheckich 37 tysięcy nazwisk 55 tysięcy rodów. L&L, 2007. ISBN 978-83-60597-10-1. (in Polish)
