= Jan Daniłowicz =

Polish noble (1570–1628)

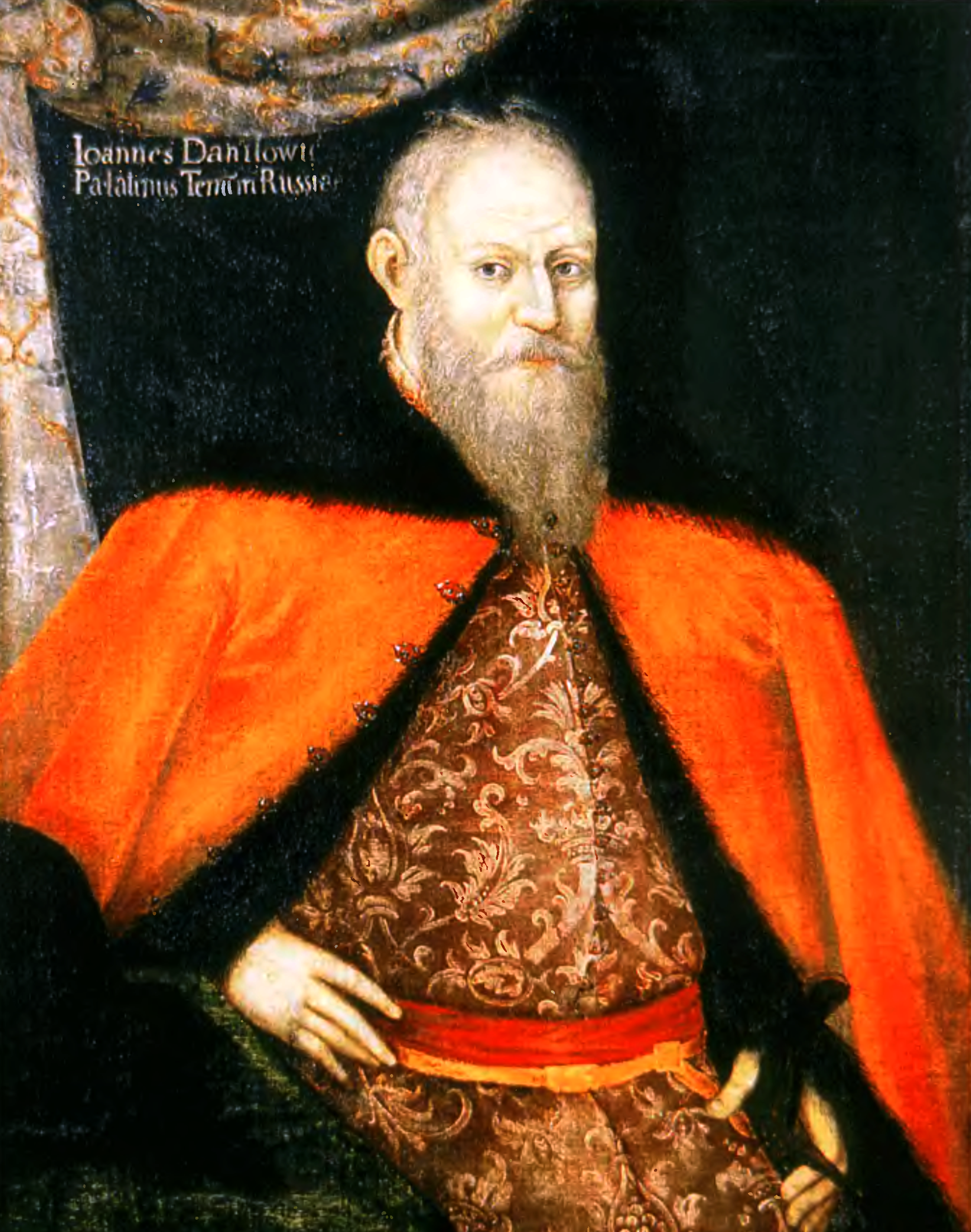
- Coat of arms: Sas
- Full name: Jan Daniłowicz na Olesku herbu Sas
- Born: 1570
- Died: 1628 (aged 57–58); Lwów
- Family: Daniłowicz
- Consort: Barbara Krasicka; Zofia Żółkiewska
- Issue: with Barbara Krasicka; Katarzyna; Marcjanna with Zofia Żółkiewska; Zofia Teofila Daniłowiczówna; Stanisław Daniłowicz; Jan Daniłowicz; Dorota Daniłowiczówna
- Father: Stanisław Daniłowicz
- Mother: Katarzyna Tarło

Jan Daniłowicz (1570–1628) was a Polish nobleman, voivode of the Ruthenian Voivodeship and grandfather of King Jan III Sobieski.

He was voivode of the Ruthenian Voivodship since 1613, castellan of Lviv since 1612, Great Krajczy of the Crown since 1600, Great Podczaszy of the Crown, łowczy of Belz, starost of Belz, Busk, Korsuń and Chyhyryn. In his youth he fought with the Tatars. In 1594 he participated in the suppression of the Nalyvaiko Uprising.

With his first wife Barbara Krasicka he had two daughters:

- Katarzyna – wife of Andrzej Firlej
- Marcjanna – wife of Stefan Koniecpolski

In 1605 he married Zofia Żółkiewska the daughter of Great Hetman of the Crown Stanisław Żółkiewski and had four children:

- Zofia Teofila – mother of King of Poland Jan III Sobieski
- Stanisław (d. 1636) – killed by Tatars
- Jan (b. 1613, d. 1618)
- Dorota – Benedictine Abbess in Lwów since 1640

== Coat of arms ==
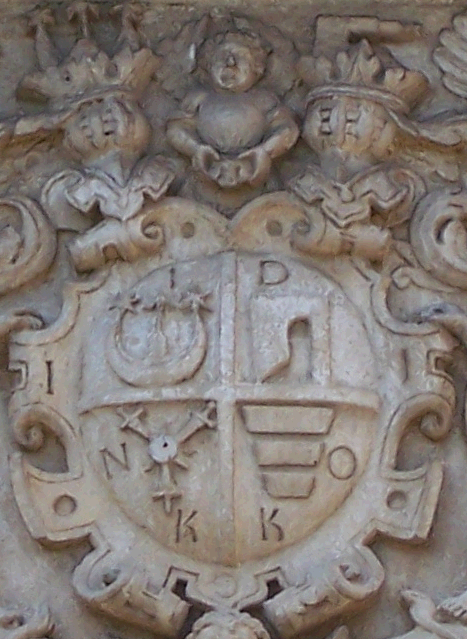
Coat of arms of Jan Daniłowicz. Sas, Topór, Herburt and Korczak coats of arms in Olesko castle main gate.

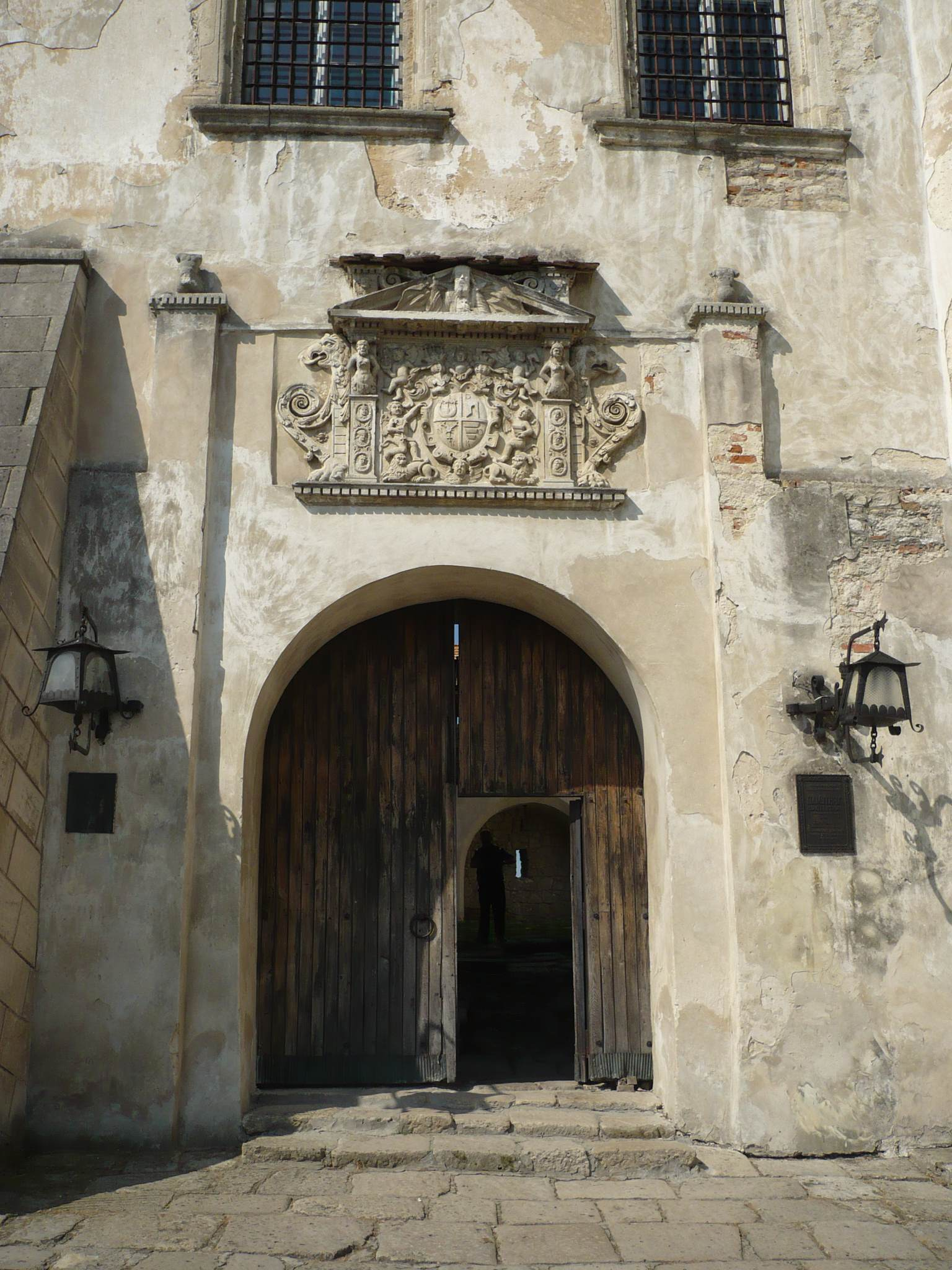
Main gate of the Olesko Castle.

== Bibliography ==
- (in Polish) Kazimierz Lepszy, Jan Daniłowicz, In: Polski Słownik Biograficzny, Kraków 1938, Vol. IV, pp. 414–415.
