= Ruthenian Voivodeship =

Historical region of the Kingdom of Poland

Coordinates: 49°51′00″N 24°01′00″E

Ruthenian Voivodeship Województwo ruskie (Polish) Palatinatus Russiae (Latin) Руське воєводство (Ukrainian)
- Voivodeship of the Crown of the Kingdom of Poland¹
- 1434–1772
- Coat of arms

- The Ruthenian Voivodeship of 1635 within the Polish–Lithuanian Commonwealth
- Capital: Lwów
- Area
  - 1770: 55,200 km^{2} (21,300 sq mi)
- Population
  - 1770: 1,495,000
- History
  - Established: 1434
  - First partition of Poland: 1772
- Political subdivisions: Five lands divided into 13 counties
Preceded by	Succeeded by
Kingdom of Galicia–Volhynia	Kingdom of Galicia and Lodomeria
- ¹ Voivodeship of the Kingdom of Poland. The kingdom was part of the Polish–Lithuanian Commonwealth from 1569.

The Ruthenian Voivodeship (Latin: Palatinatus russiae; Polish: Województwo ruskie; Ukrainian: Руське воєводство, romanized: Ruske voievodstvo) was a voivodeship of the Crown of the Kingdom of Poland from 1434 until the First Partition of Poland in 1772, with its center in the city of Lwów (lat. Leopolis) (modern day Lviv). Together with a number of other voivodeships of southern and eastern part of the Kingdom of Poland, it formed Lesser Poland Province. Following the Partitions of Poland, most of Ruthenian Voivodeship, except for its northeastern corner, was annexed by the Habsburg monarchy, as part of the province of Galicia. Today, the former Ruthenian Voivodeship is divided between Poland and Ukraine.

== History ==
Following the Galicia–Volhynia Wars, the Kingdom of Galicia–Volhynia was divided between Poland and Lithuania. In 1349, the Polish portion was transformed into the Ruthenian domain of the Crown, while the Duchy of Volhynia was held by Prince Lubart. With the death of Casimir III the Great, the Kingdom of Poland was passed on to the Kingdom of Hungary and the Ruthenian domain was governed by a Ruthenian Starosta general, one of whom was Vladislaus II of Opole.

The voivodeship was created in 1434 based on the 1430 Jedlnia-Cracow Privilege (Polish: Przywilej jedlneńsko-krakowski) on the territory that belonged to the Kingdom of Galicia–Volhynia. Between 1349 and 1434, the territory, along with the Western Podolia, was known as the Ruthenian Domain of the Crown and in such manner the King of Poland was titled as the Lord of Ruthenian lands. Western Podole was added to the domain in 1394. In 1434, on the territory of the domain were created the Ruthenian Voivodeship and Podolian Voivodeship.

In Polish sources, the western outskirts of the region were called Ziemia czerwieńska, or "Czerwień Land", from the name of Cherven, a town that existed there. Today, there are several towns with this name, none of them related to Red Ruthenia.

This area was mentioned for the first time in 981, when Vladimir the Great of Kievan Rus' took it over on the way into Poland. In 1018 it attached to Poland and in 1031 back to Kievan Rus'. For approximately 150 years, it existed as the independent Principality of Galicia and Kingdom of Galicia–Volhynia, before being conquered by Casimir III of Poland in 1349. Since these times, the name Ruś Czerwona is recorded, translated as "Red Ruthenia" ("Czerwień" means red in Slavic languages, or from the Polish village Czermno), applied to a territory extended up to Dniester River, with priority gradually transferred to Przemyśl. Since the times of Władysław II Jagiełło, the Przemyśl voivodeship was called Ruthenian Voivodeship (województwo ruskie), with its centre eventually transferred to Lwów. It consisted of five lands: Lwów, Sanok, Halych, Przemyśl, and Chełm. The territory was controlled by the Austrian Empire from 1772 to 1918, when it was known as the Kingdom of Galicia and Lodomeria.

Zygmunt Gloger, in his monumental book Historical Geography of the Lands of Old Poland (1900), provides this description of the Ruthenian Voivodeship:

In the 10th and 11th centuries, Przemysl and Czerwien were the largest gords in this region. Later on, Halych emerged as the capital of the province, while the city of Lwów was founded only in 1250. In ca. 1349, King Casimir III of Poland took control over Principality of Halych. The province was governed by royal starostas, the first one of whom was a man named Jasiek Tarnowski. Most probably in the final years of the reign of King Władysław II Jagiełło, it was named the Ruthenian Voivodeship, as at that time the voivodes of Przemysl began calling themselves the voivodes of Rus'. The first such voivode was Jan Mezyk of Dabrowa.

The Ruthenian Voivodeship consisted of five ziemias: those of Lwów, Przemysl, Sanok, Halych and Chelm. The last two had their own local authorities; furthermore, the Land of Chelm was completely separated from other Ruthenian lands by the Belz Voivodeship. Therefore, we should speak separately of four Ruthenian lands, and the Land of Chelm, whose history was much different after the Partitions of Poland [...] The lands of Lwów, Przemysl and Sanok had their sejmiks, which took place in their respective capitals. General sejmiks for these three lands were at Sadowa Wisznia, where seven deputies were elected to the Polish Sejm: two from each land, and one from the County of Zydaczow. Starostas resided at Lwów, Zhydachiv, Przemysl and Sanok. The voivodeship had six senators: the Archbishop of Lwow, the Bishop of Przemysl, the Voivode of Ruthenia, the Castellan of Lwow, and Castellans of Przemysl and Sanok [...] The city of Lwów was the seat of a separate Lesser Poland Tribunal for the voivodeships of Ruthenia, Kijów, Volhynia, Podolia, Belz, Braclaw and Czernihow [...] The County of Zydaczow, even though officially part of Lwow Land, was often regarded as a separate ziemia, with its own coat of arms, granted in 1676. In those years, Lwow Land had 618 villages and 42 towns, while the County of Zydaczow had 170 villages and 9 towns.

The Land of Przemysl was divided into two counties: those of Przemysl and Przeworsk. In 1676, the County of Przemysl had 657 villages and 18 towns, while the County of Przeworsk had 221 villages and 18 towns [...] The Land of Sanok, located in the Carpathian Foothills, was not divided into counties. In 1676, it had 371 villages and 12 towns [...]

The Land of Halicz, with its own separate local government, was divided into the counties of Trembowla, Halicz and Kolomyja. It had its own sejmik at Halicz, where six deputies were elected to the Polish Sejm (two from each county), also one deputy to the Crown Tribunal and one to the Treasury Tribunal at Radom. The Land of Halicz had one senator, and starostas, who resided in Halicz, Trembowla, Kolomuja, Tlumacz, Rohatyn, Jablonow, Sniatyn, Krasnopol, and other locations. In 1676, it had 565 villages and 38 towns.

The Land of Chelm was an enclave, separated from Ruthenian Voivodeship by Belz Voivodeship. The Bug river divided this land into two parts, and since the 10th century, Chelm was contested by Poland and Rus. In the course of the time, the Lithuanians also joined the conflict. It was ended in 1377, when King Louis annexed Chelm. The Land of Chelm had its own local offices, and a sejmik, where two deputies to the Sejm and one deputy to the Lesser Poland Tribunal were elected. It was divided into counties of Chelm and Krasnystaw, starostas resided in Chelm, Krasnystaw, Ratno, Luboml, Hrubieszow, and other locations. The Land of Chelm had two senators: the Bishop of Chelm and the Castellan of Chelm. In 1676, there were 427 villages and 23 towns in both counties [...] Southern part of the Land of Chelm belonged to the vast Zamoyski Family Fee Tail, which stretched beyond the region, into Urzędów, County of Lublin Voivodeship.

== Municipal government ==
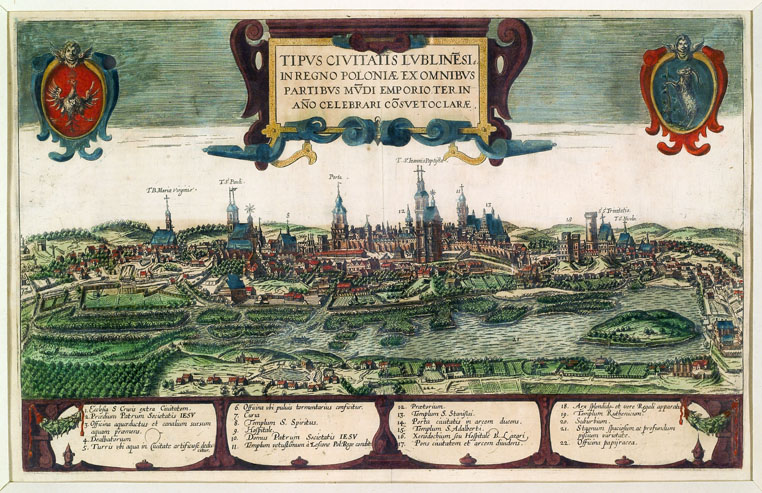
Lwów, capital of the voivodeship, in the 17th century

Seat of the Voivodeship Governor (Wojewoda):

- Lwów

Regional Sejmik (sejmik generalny) for all Ruthene lands

- Sądowa Wisznia

Seats of Regional Sejmik (sejmik poselski i deputacki):

- Lwów
- Halicz
- Sądowa Wisznia
- Przemyśl
- Sanok
- Chełm

== Administrative divisions ==
Coats of arms of the Lwów, Przemyśl, Sanok, Chełm Lands
- Chełm Land (Ziemia Chełmska), Chełm
  - Chełm County (Powiat Chełmski), Chełm
  - Hrubieszów County (Powiat Hrubieszowski), Hrubieszów
  - Krasnystaw County (Powiat Krasnystawski), Krasnystaw
  - Luboml County (Powiat Lubomelski), Luboml
  - Ratno County (Powiat Ratneński), Ratno
- Halych Land (Ziemia Halicka), Halicz
  - Halicz County (Powiat Halicki), Halicz
  - Kolomyja County (Powiat Kołomyjski), Kolomyja
  - Trembowla County (Powiat Trembowelski), Trembowla (later transferred to Podolie Voivodeship)
- Lwów Land (Ziemia Lwowska), Lwów
  - Lwów County (Powiat Lwowski), Lwów
  - Żydaczów County (Powiat Żydaczowski), Żydaczów
- Przemyśl Land (Ziemia Przemyska), Przemyśl
  - Przemyśl County (Powiat Przemyski), Przemyśl
  - Sambor County (Powiat Samborski), Sambor
  - Drohobycz County (Powiat Drohobycki), Drohobycz
  - Stryj County (Powiat Stryjski), Stryj
- Sanok Land (Ziemia Sanocka), Sanok
  - Sanok County (Powiat Sanocki), Sanok

== Voivods ==
- Stanisław Chodecki de Chotcza (from 1466–1474)
- Jakub Buczacki (from 1501)
- Stanisław Kmita de Wiśnicz (from 1500)
- Jan Odrowąż (from 1510)
- Jan Tarnowski (from April 2, 1527)
- Stanisław Odrowąż (from 1542)
- Piotr Firlej (1545–1553)
- Hieronim Jarosz Sieniawski (from 1576)
- Jan Daniłowicz de Olesko (from 1605)
- Stanisław Lubomirski (1628–1638)
- Jakub Sobieski (from June 1641)
- Jeremi Michał Wiśniowiecki (from April 1646 to 1651)
- Stefan Czarniecki (from 1651)
- Stanisław Jan Jabłonowski (from 1664)
- Jan Stanisław Jabłonowski (1697–1731)
- August Aleksander Czartoryski (from 1731)
- Stanisław Szczęsny Potocki (from 1782)

== Neighboring voivodeships and regions ==
- Kraków Voivodeship
- Sandomierz Voivodeship
- Brzesc Litewski Voivodeship
- Wolhynian Voivodeship
- Bełz Voivodeship
- Podole Voivodeship
- Lublin Voivodeship
- Moldavia
- Zemplín
- Uzh county
- Máramaros

== See also ==
- Lesser Poland
- Voivodeships of Poland
- Lendians

== Bibliography ==
- “Monumenta Poloniae Historica” (Digital copy)
- Akta grodzkie i ziemskie z archiwum ziemskiego. Lauda sejmikowe. Tom XXIII, XXIV, XXV. (Digital edition)
- Słownik geograficzny Królestwa Polskiego (Digital edition)
- Central European Superpower, Henryk Litwin, BUM Magazine, October 2016.
- Lustracja województwa ruskiego, podolskiego i bełskiego, 1564–1565 Warszawa, (I) edition 2001, pages 289. ISBN 83-7181-193-4
- Lustracje dóbr królewskich XVI-XVIII wieku. Lustracja województwa ruskiego 1661–1665. Część III ziemie halicka i chełmska. Polska Akademia Nauk – Instytut Historii. 1976
- Lustracje województw ruskiego, podolskiego i bełskiego 1564–1565, wyd. K. Chłapowski, H. Żytkowicz, cz. 1, Warszawa – Łódź 1992
- Lustracje województwa ruskiego 1661–1665, wyd. E. i K. Artanowscy, cz. 3, Ziemia halicka i chełmska, Warszawa 1976
- Lustracja województwa ruskiego 1661–1665, cz. 1: Ziemia przemyska i sanocka, wyd. K. Arłamowski i w. Kaput, Wrocław-Warszawa-Kraków. 1970
