= Hutyshche =

Rural locality in Lviv Oblast, Ukraine

Coordinates: 49°55′15″N 24°57′10″E

Hutysche (Ukrainian: Гутище, Polish: Hucisko Oleskie, also known as Huta Oleska or Huta Olejska) is a village in Zolochiv Raion, Lviv Oblast, Ukraine. It belongs to Zolochiv urban hromada, one of the hromadas of Ukraine. Hutysche is located on the road to Zolochiv. In 2001, it had 114 residents.

Before the Nazi German and Soviet invasions of Poland, it was located in Second Polish Republic. The village was a site of massacres of Poles in Volhynia by the Ukrainian OUN-UPA between 1942 and 1945. In October 1944 and in December 1944 Christmas Eve raids, Zygmunt Konopka and Józef Gabinski were executed there.

Polish villagers of Hucisko have been noted for harboring Jews trying to escape the Nazi German Holocaust.
