= Pidlyssia =

Rural locality in Lviv Oblast, Ukraine

Pidlyssia Підлисся
- Village
- Location within Ukraine Location within Lviv Oblast
- Coordinates: 49°56′01″N 24°49′07″E
- Country: Ukraine
- Oblast: Lviv Oblast
- Raion: Zolochiv Raion
- Hromada: Zolochiv urban hromada
- Established: 1550

Area
  - Total: 0,948 km^{2} (366 sq mi)
- Elevation /(average value of): 235 m (771 ft)

Population
  - Total: 297
  - Density: 35,654/km^{2} (92,340/sq mi)
- Time zone: UTC+2 (EET)
  - Summer (DST): UTC+3 (EEST)
- Postal code: 80710
- Area code: +380 3265
- Website: село Підлисся ^{(Ukrainian)}

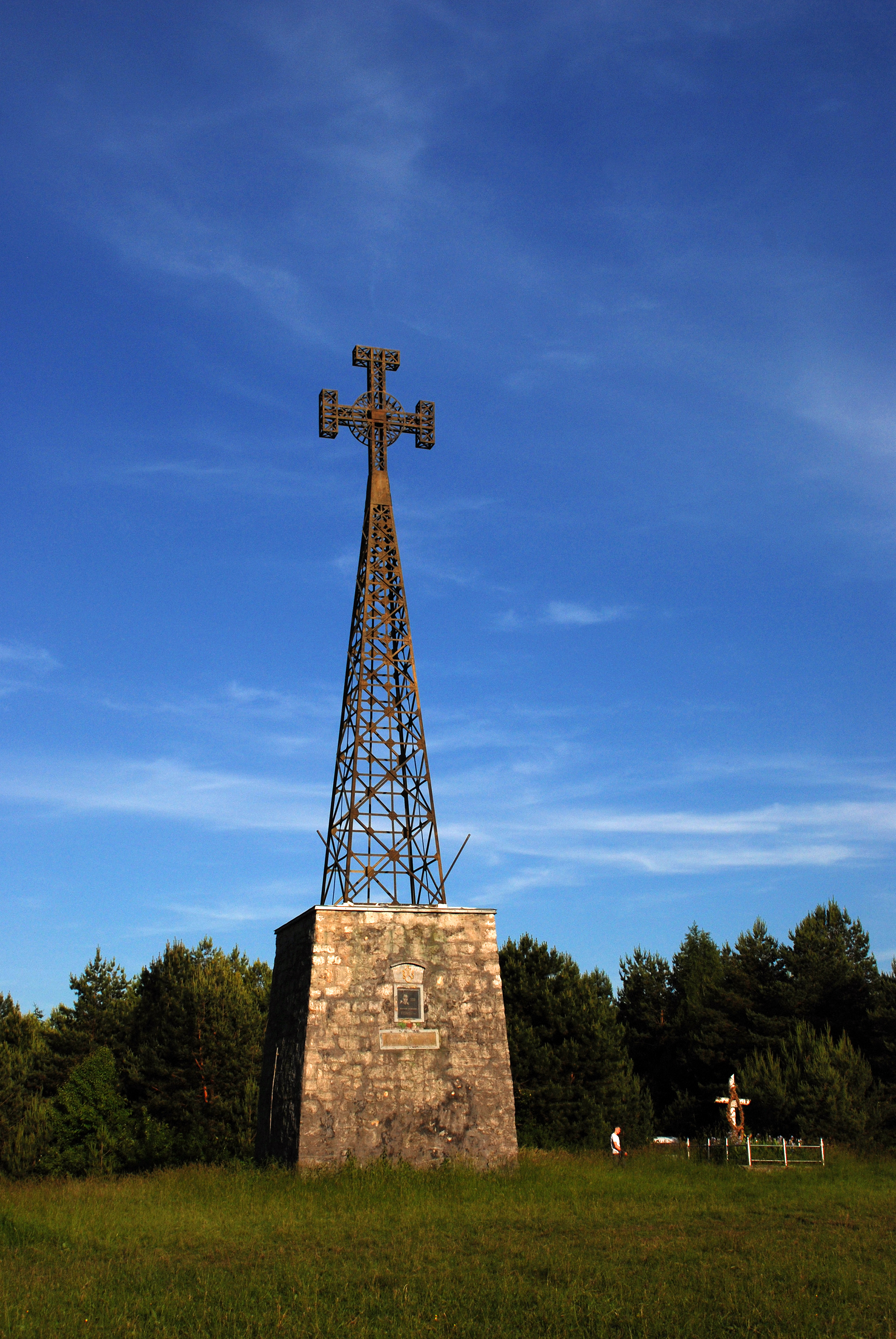
Monument to Shashkevych M. S., Ukrainian poet (by O. Lushpynsky, 1911, iron, stone), Pidlyssia, eastern outskirts, "White Mountain"

Pidlyssia (Ukrainian: Підлисся) is a village (selo) in Zolochiv Raion, Lviv Oblast, of Western Ukraine. It belongs to Zolochiv urban hromada, one of the hromadas of Ukraine. Area of the village totals is 0,948 km^{2} and the population of village is just about 297 persons. Local government was administered by Bilyi Kamin Village Council until 2020.

== Geography ==
The village is located at a distance of 4 kilometres (2.5 mi) from the highway in European route E40 E40 connecting Lviv with Kyiv. Distance from the regional center Lviv is 74 kilometres (46 mi) , 20 kilometres (12 mi) from the district center Zolochiv, and 474 kilometres (295 mi) from Kyiv.

== History ==
The first written mention of the village dates from the 1550 year. Parish school was opened in the village in 1866.

== Cultural heritage ==
Architectural monuments of the Zolochiv Raion are located in the village Pidlyssia:

- Church of the Transfiguration (Wooden), 1735 (sign. 1365).
- Farmstead of Markiian Shashkevych, 1811.

== Famous people ==
- Markiian Shashkevych – born November 6, 1811, in the village Pidlyssia. He was a priest of the Ukrainian Greek-Catholic Church, a poet, a translator, and the leader of the literary revival in Right Bank Ukraine.
