= Koltiv =

Rural locality in Lviv Oblast, Ukraine

Koltiv Колтів
- Location in Lviv Oblast Koltiv (Ukraine)
- Coordinates: 49°50′46″N 25°3′12″E
- Country: Ukraine
- Oblast: Lviv Oblast
- Raion: Zolochiv Raion
- Hromada: Zolochiv urban hromada
- Time zone: UTC+2 (EET)
  - Summer (DST): UTC+3 (EEST)
- Postal code: 80741

Koltiv (Ukrainian: Колтів, Polish: Kołtów) is a village in the Zolochiv urban hromada of the Zolochiv Raion of Lviv Oblast in Ukraine.

== History ==
The first written mention of the village was in 1467.

A large brick manor house was built in 1780 by Maciej Starzeński. The building was burned down towards the end of World War I.

In the Second Polish Republic, the village was the seat of the rural municipality of Kołtów in the Złoczów County of the Tarnopol Voivodeship.

During the Nazi German occupation, a Polish resident of the village, Maria Żurawska, hid Jewish individuals. In 2013, the Yad Vashem posthumously honored her with the title of Righteous Among the Nations.

Between 1943 and 1944, Ukrainian nationalists from the OUN-UPA murdered 71 Poles here as a part of Volhynia genocide. Two of the three attacks on the village took place on December 24, 1943, and December 24, 1944, coinciding with Christmas Eve. On 19 July 2020, as a result of the administrative-territorial reform and liquidation of the Zolochiv Raion, the village became part of the Zolochiv Raion.

== Religion ==
- Saint Michael church (1843)

== Notable residents ==
- Wacław Baworowski (1827–1909), heir
- Wiktor Baworowski (1826–1894), count, writer, poet, bibliophile, founder of the Baworowscy Library
- Petro Shkoda, participant in the battle of Kruty
- Maria Żurawska, Polish Righteous Among the Nations

== Bibliography ==
- "Kołtów". Geographical Dictionary of the Kingdom of Poland (in Polish). 4. Warszawa: Kasa im. Józefa Mianowskiego. 1883. p. 289—293.
