= Buzhok =

Rural locality in Lviv Oblast, Ukraine

- Village
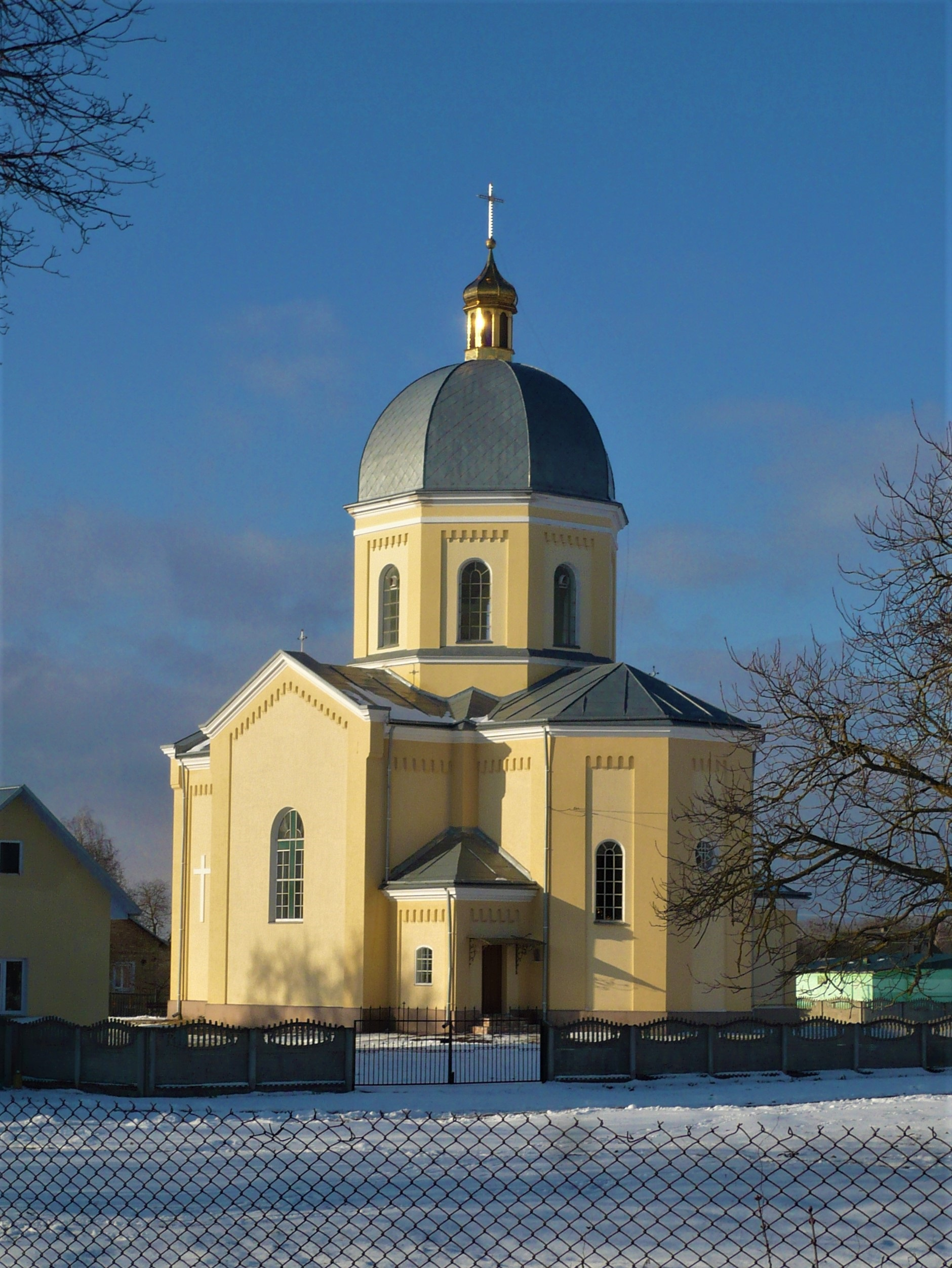

- Location within Lviv Oblast
- Coordinates: 49°53′45″N 24°49′27″E
- Country: Ukraine
- Oblast: Lviv Oblast
- Raion: Zolochiv Raion Bilokaminska village council.
- Area: 1.216 km^{2} (0.470 sq mi)
- Elevation: 239 m (784 ft)
- Population: 529
  - Density: 435/km^{2} (1,130/sq mi)
- Website: 1ua.com.ua/c25188# (in Ukrainian)

Buzhok (Ukrainian: Бужок) is a village (selo) in Zolochiv Raion, Lviv Oblast, in western Ukraine. It belongs to Zolochiv urban hromada, one of the hromadas of Ukraine. The village is about 14.5 kilometers southeast of Zolochiv. Its population is 529 people. The village refers to Bilokaminskoyi village council.

The first registers dated from 1781.
