= Zhulychi =

Rural locality in Lviv Oblast, Ukraine

Zhulychi Жуличі
- Location in Lviv Oblast Zhulychi (Ukraine)
- Coordinates: 49°51′42″N 24°52′39″E
- Country: Ukraine
- Oblast: Lviv Oblast
- Raion: Zolochiv Raion
- Hromada: Zolochiv urban hromada
- Time zone: UTC+2 (EET)
  - Summer (DST): UTC+3 (EEST)
- Postal code: 80714

Zhulychi (Ukrainian: Жуличі, Polish: Żulice) is a village in the Zolochiv urban hromada of the Zolochiv Raion of Lviv Oblast in Ukraine.

== History ==
The first written mention of the village was in 1432.

Until the consolidation in 1934, the locality served as the seat of a rural municipality in the Złoczów County of the Tarnopol Voivodeship in the Second Polish Republic.

On 19 July 2020, as a result of the administrative-territorial reform and liquidation of the Zolochiv Raion, the village became part of the Zolochiv Raion.

== Religion ==
- Saint Nicholas church (1990)

== Notable residents ==
- Vasyl Pachovskyi (1878–1942), Ukrainian playwright and poet

== Bibliography ==
- "Źulice". Geographical Dictionary of the Kingdom of Poland (in Polish). 14. Warszawa: Kasa im. Józefa Mianowskiego. 1895. p. 851.
