= Marian Iwańciów =

Polish painter (1906–1971)

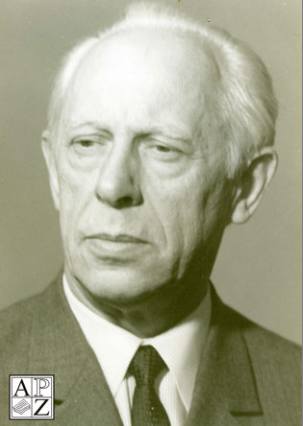
circa 1960

Marian Iwańciów (4 February 1906 in Zolochiv – 14 March 1971 in Zamość) was a Polish painter. He was the son of Filip Iwańciów and Stanisława Maria Sieprawska.

He graduated from the faculty of Fine Arts at Stefan Batory University in Vilnius and received the artist degree in 1934. After the second world war, he studied at the Nicolaus Copernicus University in Toruń for a year.

His works of art were shown at the annual exhibitions of the Fine Arts faculty at Stefan Batory University in the years of 1933, 1934/1935. In 1939, his engravings (together with the works by other contemporary artists) were displayed at the Polish military graphics exhibition which took place in Poznań. His graphics and paintings were shown in Vilnius a year later during the individual exhibition. Some of his individual exhibitions took place in Wrocław (1953), Lublin (1960, 1963, 1964) and Zamość (1963, 1964, 1966). His travels (mainly to France, Romania and Jugoslavia) provided inspiration for the set of water-colours, drawings in pastel and oil paintings which he created in the 1960s. At that time, they were presented at the individual exhibition known as Notatki z podróży.

He was called up before the outbreak of the second world war. In 1939, he was arrested and imprisoned on the Solovetsky Islands. He spent two months in the Soviet Gulag of Solovki. He returned to Vilnius when he was released as they closed the prison because of the war. The prison buildings were transformed into a naval base. He worked as a secondary-school teacher in Vilnius until 21 June 1941. In 1944 he moved to Trakai where he settled. The political situation in the Lithuanian SSR forced him to leave the country and arrive in Poland. He lived in the Lower Silesia region of Poland and then in Zamość from 1953. Apart from painting, he was engaged in teaching. He worked as a teacher in Państwowe Liceum Sztuk Plastycznych (The Fine Art State College). He was the manager of this school from 1965 to 1969. He was one of the founders of Grupa Zamojska, the local art group.

Marian Iwańciów was an outstanding artist of the Zamość region in 1960s. He did not belong to any political party. He was awarded The Golden Cross of Merit (i.e. the highest Polish civil state award) for his creative work.

== Sources ==
- Kazimierz Brakoniecki, Jan Kotłowski, Lech Lechowicz Wileńskie środowisko artystyczne 1919-1945, Olsztyn 1989
- Józef Poklewski Polskie życie artystyczne w międzywojennym Wilnie, Toruń 1994
- Jerzy Malinowski, Michał Woźniak, Ruta Janoniene Fine arts education in Vilnius and its tradition, Toruń-Wilno 1996
