= Sassov (Hasidic dynasty) =

Ukrainian Hasidic dynasty

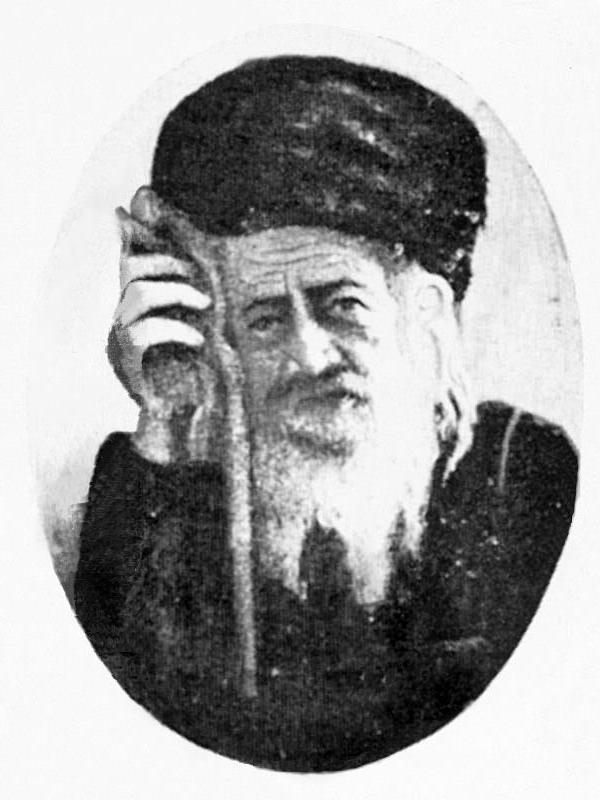
Rabbi Shlomo of Sassov

The Sassov (also Sassow) Hasidic dynasty began with Rabbi Moshe Leib Erblich of Sassov (1745–1807), a disciple of Rabbi Dovber of Mezeritch, the disciple of the Baal Shem Tov, the founder of Hasidism.

Sassov was located in Eastern Galicia, and is now in Ukraine.

In the late 19th century, the descendants of Rabbi Moishe Leib of Sassov had become rabbis in other cities. The town people found themselves without a Rebbe. They asked Rabbi Sholom Rokeach, known as the Sar Shalom of Belz, for guidance as to whom to appoint as Rebbe. He advised them to nominate his grandson, Rabbi Shlomo. Rabbi Shlomo's father was the first Rebbe of Alesk and his mother was the daughter of the Sar Shalom. Rabbi Shlomo died in 1919.

Rabbi Lipa Meir Teitelbaum, a great-grandson of Rabbi Shlomo "of Sassov" and the founder of Kiryat Yismach Moshe in Ganei Tikva, in Israel, was the "Sassov"-Keretzky Rebbe. In his first marriage, he was the son-in-law of Rabbi Joel Teitelbaum of Satmar. He died in March 1966, and was subsequently succeeded by his two sons (both from his second marriage to Rebbetzin Bluma): Grand Rabbi Yoseph Dovid Teitelbaum, the "Sassover Rebbe" in Kiryat Yismach Moshe and a son-in-law of Grand Rabbi David Moshe of Kretchnif (Rabbi Yoseph Dovid was a disciple of the previous Klausenberger Rebbe) and Rabbi Chanoch Henoch Teitelbaum, the "Sassover Rebbe" in Monsey, New York.

== See also ==
- History of the Jews in Poland
- History of the Jews in Galicia (Central Europe)
- History of the Jews in Ukraine
