= Zarvanytsia, Lviv Oblast =

Rural locality in Lviv Oblast, Ukraine

Zarvanytsia Зарваниця
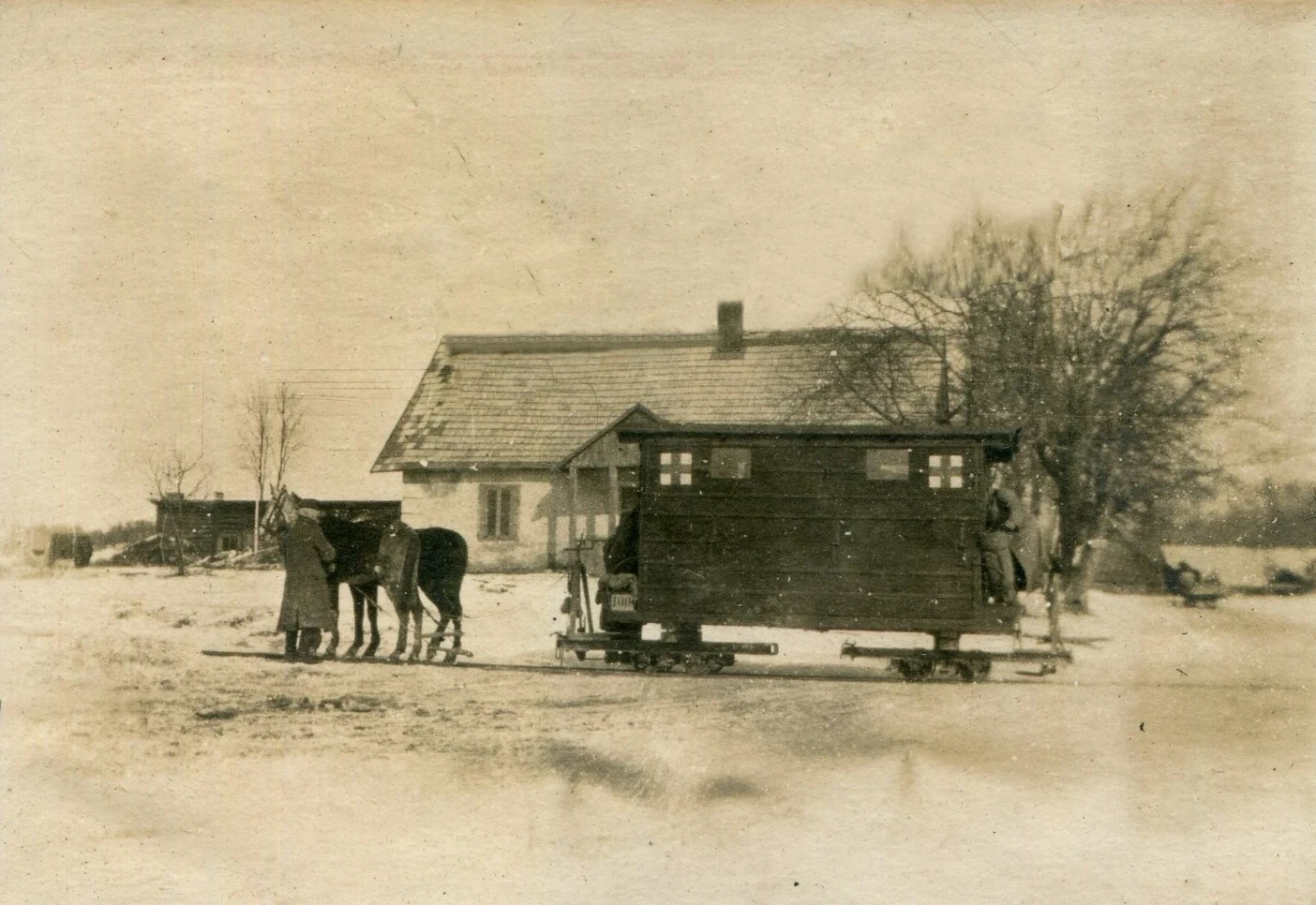
- Horse-drawn hospital wagon on the Zarwanica-Złoczów (Zarvanytsia-Zolochiv) light railway during WWI

- Location within Ukraine Location within Lviv Oblast
- Coordinates: 49°46′10″N 24°58′47″E
- Country: Ukraine
- Oblast: Lviv Oblast
- Raion: Zolochiv Raion

Area
  - Total: 0.684 km^{2} (0.264 sq mi)
- Elevation: 286 m (938 ft)

Population (2001 census)
  - Total: 265
  - Density: 387.43/km^{2} (1,003.4/sq mi)
- Time zone: UTC+2 (EET)
  - Summer (DST): UTC+3 (EEST)
- Postal code: 80753
- Area code: +380 3544

Zarvanytsia (Ukrainian: Зарваниця) is a village in Zolochiv Raion (district) of Lviv Oblast (province) in western Ukraine. It belongs to Zolochiv urban hromada, one of the hromadas of Ukraine.
