= Josephine Jackson =

Ukrainian pornographic actress (born 1995)

- Born: February 1, 1995 (age 31); Zolochiv, Lviv Oblast, Ukraine
- Other name: Yuliya Senyuk
- Education: Lviv University of Trade and Economics
- Height: 170 cm (5 ft 7 in)

Yuliya Romanivna Senyuk (Ukrainian: Юлія Романівна Сенюк; born 1 February 1995), better known under the pseudonym Josephine Jackson (Ukrainian: Джозефіна Джексон) is a Ukrainian pornographic actress and philanthropist. In September 2025 Jackson left Ukraine as a protest against criminal prosecutions of her colleagues.

== Early life ==
Born in Zolochiv, Lviv Oblast, Senyuk was brought up by her grandparents in what she described as an approach of "strictness, discipline and control" and has said that this could have influenced her eventual career choice. After finishing the ninth year of school, she joined her parents in Lviv, where she entered the Commercial Academy, majoring in international relations. She eventually graduated with a master's degree, but never worked in the field.

== Career ==
At the age of 23 Senyuk, who had participated in erotic photo sessions, was successful in her first casting for a pornographic film, which took place in Hungary. After her first shooting became a success, she decided to undertake a career in the adult movie industry, despite protests from her family. In 2019 she was nominated for Best New Starlet at XBIZ Awards, and later became a multiple nominee for AVN Awards.

Following the Russian invasion of 2022, Jackson returned to Ukraine from Budapest, where she had been living. Starting from 2023, she has engaged in fundraising for soldiers of the Ukrainian Army. In 2024 she organized an initiative for amputee veterans of the Russo-Ukrainian War, issuing a charity photo calendar depicting her with Ukrainian soldiers, in order to provide them with titanium prosthetics. She also took part in a project providing psychological help for veterans and their families.

Jackson is known as a supporter of decriminalization of the Ukrainian porn industry, considering its banning to be damaging for the economy and promoting corruption. In September 2025, she announced her departure from Ukraine in a post on X justifying it with the criminal prosecution against her colleagues. In earlier interviews, Jackson said that she only took part in adult film shoots abroad, in Hungary and the Czech Republic, as such activity was banned in Ukraine. She did not give details about her new country of residence.

== Personal life ==
Senyuk says she is an introvert who likes to spend time at home. Her partner is a man from Kyiv, with whom she got acquainted on Instagram. Senyuk has denied claims that her profession can be seen as adultery, and stated that her partner does not object to her work, as she earns more money than he does.
