= Alesk (Hasidic dynasty) =

Hasidic dynasty

Alesk is the name of a Hasidic dynasty founded by Rebbe Chanoch Henikh Dov Majer. It is named after Alesk, the Yiddish name of Olesko, a town in present-day Ukraine.

== Lineage ==
- Rebbe Chanoch Henich Dov Mayer (died August 1884), first Alesker Rebbe known as the Lev Sameach (lit. "happy heart"), son-in-law of Grand Rabbi Sholom Rokeach of Belz. His works include Lev Sameach on the Torah, Siddur Lev Sameach, and Hagaddah Lev Sameach. He also codified the Torah writings of his father-in-law.
  - Rabbi Yitzchak Maier (died March 1904), son of Rebbe Chanoch Henich Dov Mayer.
  - Rabbi Asher Anschel Ashkenazi (1832-1896), son of Rabbi Joel Ashkenazi and son-in-law of Rebbe Chanoch Henich Dov Mayer. Rabbi Asher Anschel was a descendant of the Chacham Zvi.
    - Rabbi Yitzchok Ashkenazi (Weliczker) (died October 1942) son of Rabbi Yaakov Hersh Weliczker and son-in-law of Rabbi Asher Anschel Ashkenazi.
    - Rabbi Abraham Naftali Ashkenazi (died 1928), son of Rabbi Asher Anschel Ashkenazi.
    - Rabbi Zvi Hirsch Ashkenazi (died 1942), son of Rabbi Asher Anschel Ashkenazi.
      - Rabbi Meshullam Yissachar Ashkenazi (born 1905; died November 1994), son of Rabbi Zvi Hirsch Ashkenazi.
        - Rabbi Uri Ashkenazi (died March 2020), son of Rabbi Meshullam Yissachar Ashkenazi.
    - Rabbi Moshe David Ashkenazi (died 1930), son of Rabbi Asher Anschel Ashkenazi.
    - Rabbi Israel Ashkenazi (died May 1935), son of Rabbi Asher Anschel Ashkenazi.

The previous rabbi of Alesk, Rabbi Yitzchok Ashkenazi, resided in Brooklyn, NY. He died on January, 10th, 2022.

The grand rebbes of Sassov, Kaliv, Stanislov, Trisk, Malin and Radomishel are descendants of the Alesk dynasty.

=== Stanislav sub-dynasty ===
Rabbi Asher Anschel Ashkenazi established the Stanislav dynasty in western Ukraine in a town now known as Ivano-Frankivsk. The town used to be called Stanisławów, and is still known in Yiddish as Stanislav.

Arriving in London after surviving the Holocaust, Rabbi Meshullam Yissachar Ashkenazi became known as the Stanislav-Alesker Rebbe.

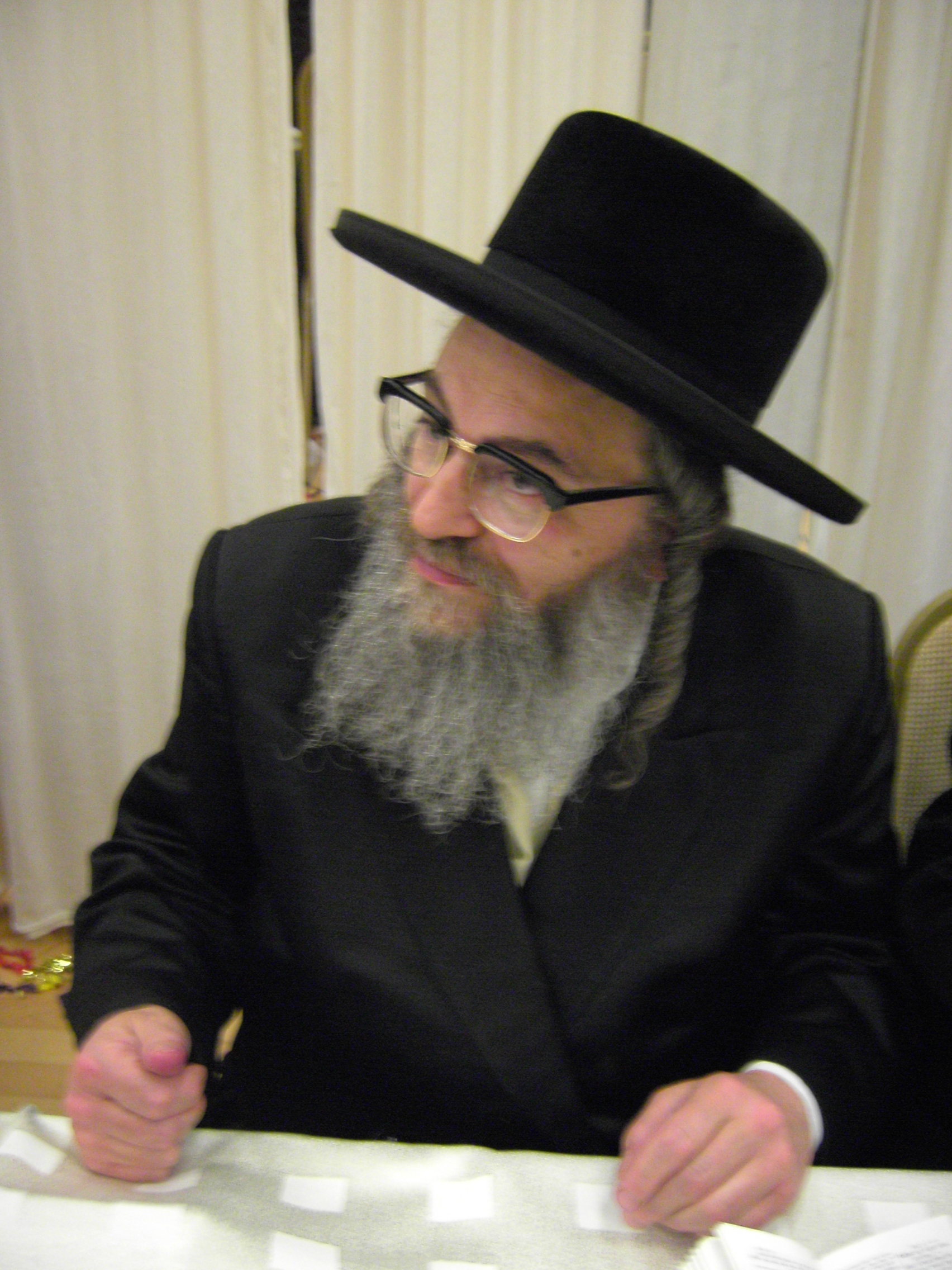
Rabbi Uri Ashkenazi, Stanislover Rebbe of London

After his death in 1994, his son, Rabbi Uri Ashkenazi, became the Stanislaver Rebbe of London. He was a well-known mohel and led his Beth midrash in Stamford Hill London. He was hospitalized in a serious state after testing positive for coronavirus on March 25, 2020, and he died the next day.

== See also ==
- History of the Jews in Poland
- History of the Jews in Galicia (Eastern Europe)
- History of the Jews in Ukraine
