= Michael Hnatiuk =

Austrian-Hungarian Ukrainian officer and commander

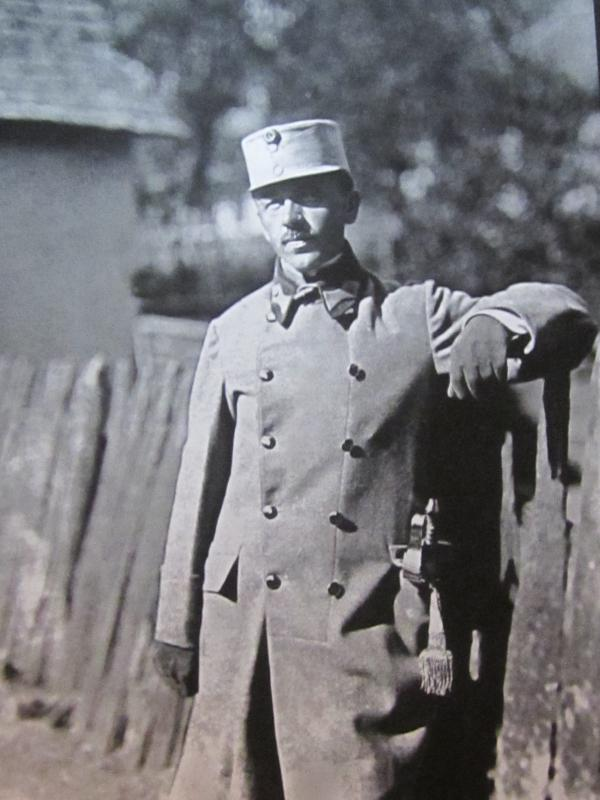
Michael Hnatiuk

Michael Hnatiuk, or Mykhailo Hnatiuk (Ukrainian: Михайло Гнатюк, born 1883 in Sasiv, Galicia, Austria-Hungary) was an Austrian-Hungarian Ukrainian officer and commander of a legion of the Ukrainian Sich Riflemen.

== Biography ==
Mykhailo Hnatiuk studied at the philosophical faculty of the University of Lviv.

He joined the Ukrainian Sich Riflemen in 1914. He was as first lieutenant the commander of a military engineering legion, which troops were riflemen that had recovered from illness or injury.

Hnatiuk emigrated to the United States. His further biography there is unknown.

== Literature ==
- М. Лазарович. 2005. Легіон Українських Січових Стрільців. Тернопіль: Джура. ISBN 966-8017-92-7 (in Ukrainian)
