= Zolochiv urban hromada =

Urban hromada in Lviv Oblast, Ukraine

Zolochiv urban hromada Золочівська міська громада
- Hromada
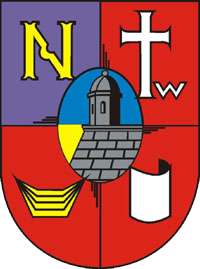
- Seal
- Interactive map of Zolochiv urban hromada
- Coordinates: 49°48′26.97″N 24°54′11.02″E
- Country: Ukraine
- Oblast: Lviv Oblast
- Raion: Zolochiv Raion
- Admin. center: Zolochiv

Area
  - Total: 630.7 km^{2} (243.5 sq mi)

Population (2022)
  - Total: 48,822
  - Density: 77.41/km^{2} (200.5/sq mi)
- CATOTTG code: UA46040070000032075
- Settlements: 67
- Cities: 1
- Villages: 66

Zolochiv urban territorial hromada (Ukrainian: Золочівська міська територіальна громада, romanized: Zolochivska miska terytorialna hromada) is a hromada in Lviv Oblast, western Ukraine. Its administrative centre is the city of Zolochiv.

Zolochiv urban hromada has a total area of 630.7 square kilometres (243.5 mi^{2}). Its total population is 48,822 (2022 estimate).

The hromada was established in 2020, as part of administrative reforms in Ukraine.

== Settlements ==
In addition to one city (Zolochiv), the hromada includes the following 66 villages:

- Bilyi Kamin
- Bir
- Bonyshyn
- Buzhok
- Velyka Vilshanytsia
- Verkhobuzh
- Voroniaky
- Havarechchyna
- Holohirky
- Holohory
- Honcharivka
- Horodyliv
- Hrabovo
- Hutyshche
- Derevianky
- Yelykhovychi
- Zhulychi
- Zalissia
- Zarvanytsia
- Zashkiv
- Zozuli
- Zolochivka
- Kamianyste
- Kyikiv
- Kniazhe
- Kobylechchyna
- Kozaky
- Koltiv
- Kopani
- Kruhiv
- Lisovi
- Luh
- Luka
- Maidan-Holohirskyi
- Mytulyn
- Monastyrok
- Novoselyshche
- Novosilky
- Obertasiv
- Opaky
- Osovytsia
- Papirnia
- Pidhorodne
- Pidlyptsi
- Pidlyssia
- Pisok
- Pluhiv
- Pobich
- Pochapy
- Rozvazh
- Ruda
- Ruda-Koltivska
- Sasiv
- Skvariava
- Stadnia
- Stinka
- Strutyn
- Trostianets
- Trudovach
- Ushnia
- Khylchytsi
- Khmeleva
- Khomets
- Chervone
- Cheremoshnia
- Yasenivtsi
