= Moshe Leib of Sassov =

Hasidic rebbe (c. 1745–1847)

Rabbi Moshe Yehudah Leib Erblich, popularly known as Rabbi Moshe Leib of Sassov, (c. 1745 – January 13 1807) was one of the early Hasidic rebbes in 18th century Europe. He was the first rebbe of the town of Sasiv (Yiddish: סאַסעוו, romanized: Sassov), and the founder of the Sassov Hasidic dynasty.

== Biography ==
Rabbi Moshe Leib of Sassov was born c. 1745 in either Sasiv or Brody to Rabbi Yaakov and Rivkah Erblich. (Note: According to some sources, his parents' last name was Etinge.) Although his father held the views of the misnagdim, Moshe Leib studied under Rabbi Shmelke of Nikolsburg, one of the great hasidic rebbes in the early years of Hasidism, who was one of the foremost students of the prominent Hasidic master, the Maggid of Mezritch. He later went on to study under the Maggid of Mezritch himself as well as Rabbi Elimelech of Lizhensk. He was a contemporary of Hasidic rebbes Rabbi Levi Yitzchak of Berditchev, the Kozhnitzer Maggid, and the Chozeh of Lublin.

After a stint in Opatów, Rabbi Erblich moved to Sasiv where he established the hasidic court of Sassov, which attracted many followers. Among his students were Rabbi Tzvi Hirsh of Ziditchov, Rabbi Menachem Mendel of Kosov, Rabbi Yaakov Yitzchak of Peshischa (known as the Yid HaKadosh), Rabbi Meir of Premishlan, and Rabbi Abraham David Wahrman of Buchach. He was renowned for his boundless love for all Jews. He died on January 13, 1807, in Sasiv and was succeeded as rebbe by his son, Rabbi Yekusiel Shmuel Shmelke Erblich.

== Works ==
- תורת הרמ"ל השלם (Hebrew: Torat HaRamal HaShalem), Sighetu Marmației
- ליקוטי רמ"ל (Hebrew: Likutei Ramal), Chernivtsi
- ליקוטי רמ"ל (Hebrew: Likutei Ramal), Lviv
- חידושי הרמ"ל (Hebrew: Chiddushei HaRamal), c. 1921, Vienna
