= Sasiv =

Village in Lviv Oblast, Ukraine

Sasiv Сасів
- Village
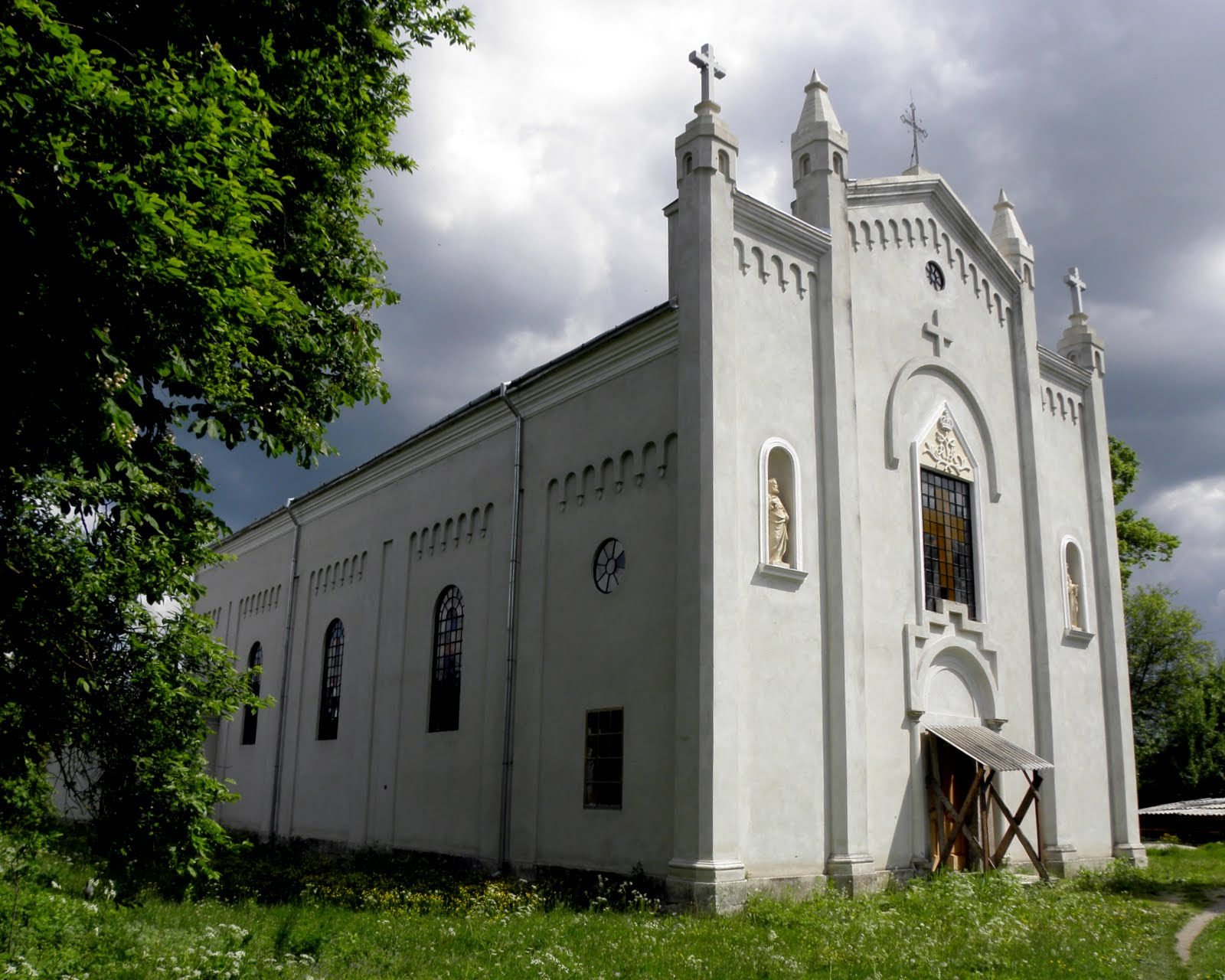
- Church of the Nativity of St. John the Baptist in Sasiv built in 1864 in the style of Gothic Revival architecture

- Location in Ukraine Sasiv (Lviv Oblast)
- Coordinates: 49°52′15″N 24°56′56″E
- Country: Ukraine
- Oblast: Lviv Oblast
- Raion: Zolochiv Raion
- Hromada: Zolochiv urban hromada
- Town founded: 1615
- Founder: Jan Daniłowicz

Government
  - Mayor: Mykhaylo Antonovych Hetmanchyk

Area
  - Total: 1.853 km^{2} (0.715 sq mi)
- Elevation: 272 m (892 ft)

Population (2013)
  - Total: 761
  - Density: 411/km^{2} (1,060/sq mi)
- Time zone: UTC+2 (EET)
  - Summer (DST): UTC+3 (EEST)
- Postal code: 80713
- Area code: +380 3265

Sasiv (Ukrainian: Сасів; Polish: Sasów, Sassów; Yiddish: סאַסאָװ, Russian: Сасов) is a village in Zolochiv Raion, Lviv Oblast, Ukraine, since 1945. Until 1772 the village was located in the historical territory of Ruthenia, in the Ruthenian Voivodeship of the Crown of the Kingdom of Poland, thereafter until 1919 became part of the Austro-Hungarian Cisleithanian crown lands in the Kingdom of Galicia and Lodomeria (Galicia). From 1919 until 1945 the town was once again part of Poland within the Tarnopol Voivodeship. It belongs to Zolochiv urban hromada, one of the hromadas of Ukraine. The town is located 8 km north-east of Zolochiv on the west bank of Western Bug River.

== Etymology ==
The town's Polish name Sasów, also written as Sassów, is derived from the Jan Daniłowicz family coat of arms "Sas" (Saxon) clan, itself derived from the medieval 12th-century German migrants of Saxony, see Transylvanian Saxons. In Ukrainian language the town name was Сассів (Sassiv).

== History ==
In 1511, the rural settlement of Komarów (Ukrainian: Комарiв) became the property of Anna Sienieńska and was a key part of the commune of Olesko, located in the historical state of Ruthenia, Kingdom of Galicia–Volhynia. In 1605, Olesko and Olesko Castle became the property of wealthy landowner and nobleman Jan Daniłowicz herbu Sas, Voivode of the Ruthenian Voivodeship and grandfather of later King Jan III Sobieski.

With the sanction of King Sigismund III Vasa, Sasów town was founded in place of the settlement of Komarów in 1615 by Jan Daniłowicz and granted town charter status in the Ruthenian Voivodeship, the town was named Sasów (Sassów) after Jan Daniłowicz' Sas clan coat-of-arms. With its town charter status modeled on the Magdeburg rights, Sasów was permitted a degree of internal autonomy, hold fairs three times a year which took place at ceremonies of Saint Stanislaus, Saint Michael and Saint Nicholas, as well as trade fairs and auctions every Wednesday and Saturday, its residents (burghers) were also exempt from public taxation for a period of 4 years, and perpetually from tolls and customs duties applicable on Ruthenian lands, with exception of the frontier duty. King Sigismund III Vasa also ordered construction of a highway, which was to pass through the town, on the highway leading from Lviv, Kamianets-Podilskyi, Bar, Terebovl and Ternopil to Kremenets, Lutsk, Horodło and Sokal. The town had a defensive character and was located on an important trade route from Podolia in Volhynia, where merchants passing through would stop in Sasów, thus developing its economy. At the top of nearby Mount Grodzisko was the castle.

The town easily achieved economic and commercial prosperity. In 1628 there was already the first wooden church, and in 1631 a Catholic parish. 1638 the town became a paper mill, exporting to Germany, France, Russia and Turkey, where the tradition continued into the 19th century with the new Paper Products Works building in 1860, which at that time was considered to be the largest in Europe. In Vienna, middlemen would cut, package and place Viennese or French brands to Sasów produced paper. The Sasów paper mill operations remained until 1915, where during World War I it was destroyed by the Imperial Russian Army. To date, the buildings remain unoccupied.

In 1648, Sasów was besieged by attack troops of Tatars, where King John II Casimir Vasa defeated them and freed the town from siege. In August 1649 citizen of Sasów defend the town from further attacks by the Tatars. In 1675, Turkish forces attacked Sasów. The town and castle were burned, and many of its inhabitants were killed. After the attack, King Jan III Sobieski became the town patron, who would often together with his wife Marie Casimire Louise de La Grange d'Arquien hunt in the woods of Sasów. In 1682, Sasów lost its town rights, and during the first half of the 18th century James Louis Sobieski' daughter—Maria Karolina Sobieska Duchess of Bouillon—conveyed Sasów to the Polish magnate Radziwiłł family, from there the town would later succeed into the hands of Count Starzeński.

Between 1772–1918 the town was part of the Austro-Hungarian Cisleithanian crown lands in the Kingdom of Galicia and Lodomeria, from 1867 Sasów belonged to the administration district of Zolochiv. Throughout this period, Sasów was inhabited by Poles and Ukrainians (with a town population total of 2,697 according to the census of 1857). A Roman Catholic parish with Catholic works. In the 19th century, Sasów developed into and was known as a hydrotherapy health spa resort for the wealthy, which saw during the summer season some 300–400 people staying. On the islands of the nearby Western Bug River were built hospitals, houses for patients who walked the green seating areas, admiring the scenery, and on the large reservoir was a palace. This water park was built by Count Starzeński. Emperor Franz Joseph I of Austria during his journey to Galicia stayed in Sasów and while staying there became the godfather to Count Starzeński's son. Nobility came from the cities for parties and concerts that took place in the palace hall. The town resort declined as a result of World War I, and the park was destroyed by tanks. From 1921, shortly after the end of World War I, the town was once again part of Poland within the Tarnopol Voivodeship.

During the occupation of Poland by Nazi Germany and the Soviet Union, the town was deprived of civic rights and incorporated into the new rural community of Sasów in the District of Galicia. After World War II the municipality was incorporated into the Ukrainian Soviet Socialist Republic.

=== Jewish community ===
In 1726 James Louis Sobieski, son of King Jan III Sobieski, gifted the town's Jewish inhabitants various legal rights, resulting in all communal facilities of the Jewish community being exempted from taxes. The town's Jewish inhabitants would be permitted to produce and deal in alcoholic beverages, and their level of excise duties would be no higher than those of other town inhabitants. In 1764 there were 223 Jews living in Sasów, by 1880 1,906. In 1912 there were 1,761 Jews, representing 52.1% of the town's total population. 1921 there were 1,096 (35.4%) Jews living in the town. The town's Jewish population produced candles and ornamental strips (atarot) for prayer-shawls, for which Sasów was a world leading center. Before 1939 there were about 1,500 Jewish people in the town of Sasów. The most famous Jew of the town was the author and founder of the Sasov Hasidic Judaism dynasty, Rabbi Moshe Leib Erblich (Hebrew משה לייב מסאסוב) of Sasów.

On 17 September 1939, the Red Army entered the town, which was under Soviet administration until the German-Soviet war. Nazi Germans occupied the town on 2 July 1941; during the first couple of weeks they killed 22 Jewish community leaders on the claim these were communists. Three Aktionen took place, the largest on 15 July 1942, when the Jews were deported to Belzec extermination camp. The remaining 400 Jews were deported on 25 November 1942 to the forced-labor camp Zolochiv, which had been set up in March 1942. When this camp was liquidated in July 1943, all its inmates were shot not far from the camp in the forest. After the end of the war, the Jewish community of Sasów could not be reconstituted.

== Notable people ==
- Michael Hnatiuk – Ukrainian officer and commander of a legion of the Ukrainian Sich Riflemen.
- Rabbi Moshe Yehudah Leib Erblich⁣ – one of the early Hasidic rebbes in 18th century Europe.
- Yitzhak Rafael (1914–1999), Israeli Deputy Minister of Health and Minister of Religions

== See also ==
- Sassov (Hasidic dynasty)

== Bibliography ==
- Filip Sulimierski, Bronisław Chlebowski, Władysław Walewski, Słownik geograficzny Królestwa Polskiego i innych krajów słowiańskich (English: Geographical Dictionary of the Polish Kingdom and other Slavic countries), v. X, Warsaw, 1880–1902, p. 333. (in Polish)
