= Bilyi Kamin =

Rural locality in Lviv Oblast, Ukraine

Bilyi Kamin Білий Камінь
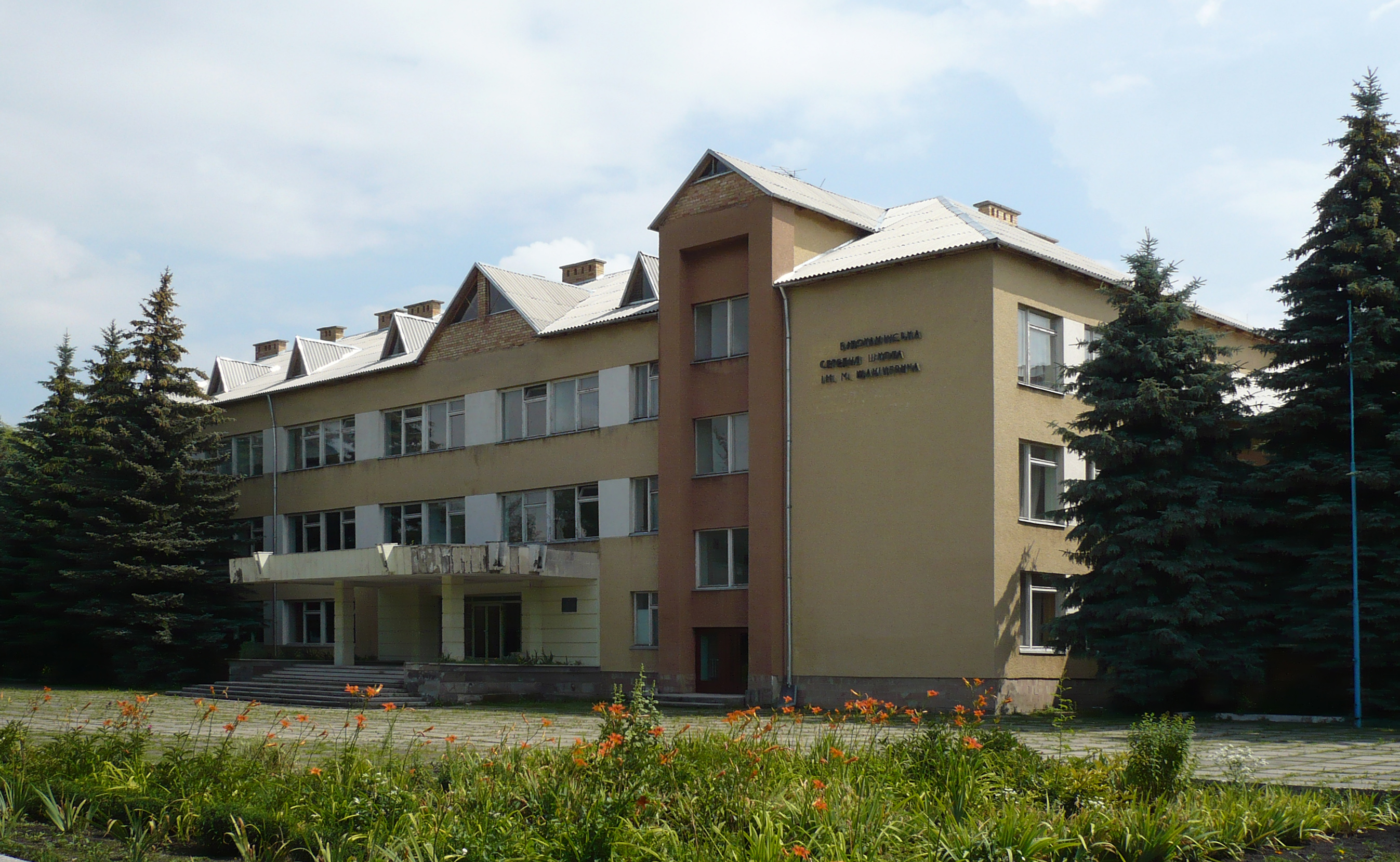
- High school

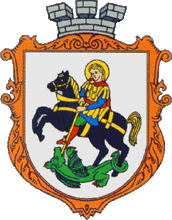
- Flag Seal

- Location within Ukraine Location within Lviv Oblast
- Coordinates: 49°54′0″N 24°50′0″E
- Country: Ukraine
- Oblast: Lviv Oblast
- Raion: Zolochiv Raion
- Hromada: Zolochiv urban hromada

Area
  - Total: 1,944 km^{2} (751 sq mi)

Population
  - Total: 776
  - Density: 0.399/km^{2} (1.03/sq mi)

Bilyi Kamin (Ukrainian: Білий Камінь, Polish: Biały Kamień) is a village in Zolochiv Raion in Lviv Oblast, located in western Ukraine. It belongs to Zolochiv urban hromada, one of the hromadas of Ukraine. Bilyi Kamin is located near the larger town of Brody, Ukraine.

Bilyi Kamin is located upon the Buh river. Ruins of an early 17th-century castle constructed by Wiśniowiecki family are located in the village.

== Jewish Community ==
The first mention of Bialy Kamin's Jewish community was in 1629. The settlement grew heavily towards the end of the 17th century. The town suffered a major fire in 1902, causing many Jews to die.

During The First World War, many Jews in Bialy Kamin had been deported. Not much is known about the interwar period, but the Jewish community was very poor and many Jews left the town to find income in the city. By the time of the Second World War, there were 291 Jews remaining. It is presumed that many of these Jews faced the same fate as the other Jews in Zolochiv. On December 1, 1942, a ghetto was set up for Jews in the vicinity of Zolochiv, including Bilyi Kamin, Sasow, and Olesko. On April 23, the ghetto was liquidated. The remaining Jews were taken to a nearby village called Jelechowice and were murdered in mass graves that had been dug in advance. Many Jews were spared by preparing hiding places in the ghetto weeks in advance. After the ghetto was liquidated, a labor camp remained in the town. Two secret groups were established in the camp, one led by P. Nachumovits and another led by H. Safran. Both groups had escaped the camp and were betrayed by nearby Germans. Many were murdered.

== Notable residents ==
- Michael Korybut, King of Poland and Grand Duke of Lithuania.
- Uri Zvi Greenberg, Polish-born Israeli poet, journalist and politician.
