= Zolochiv, Lviv Oblast =

City in Lviv Oblast, Ukraine

Zolochiv Золочів Złoczów
- City
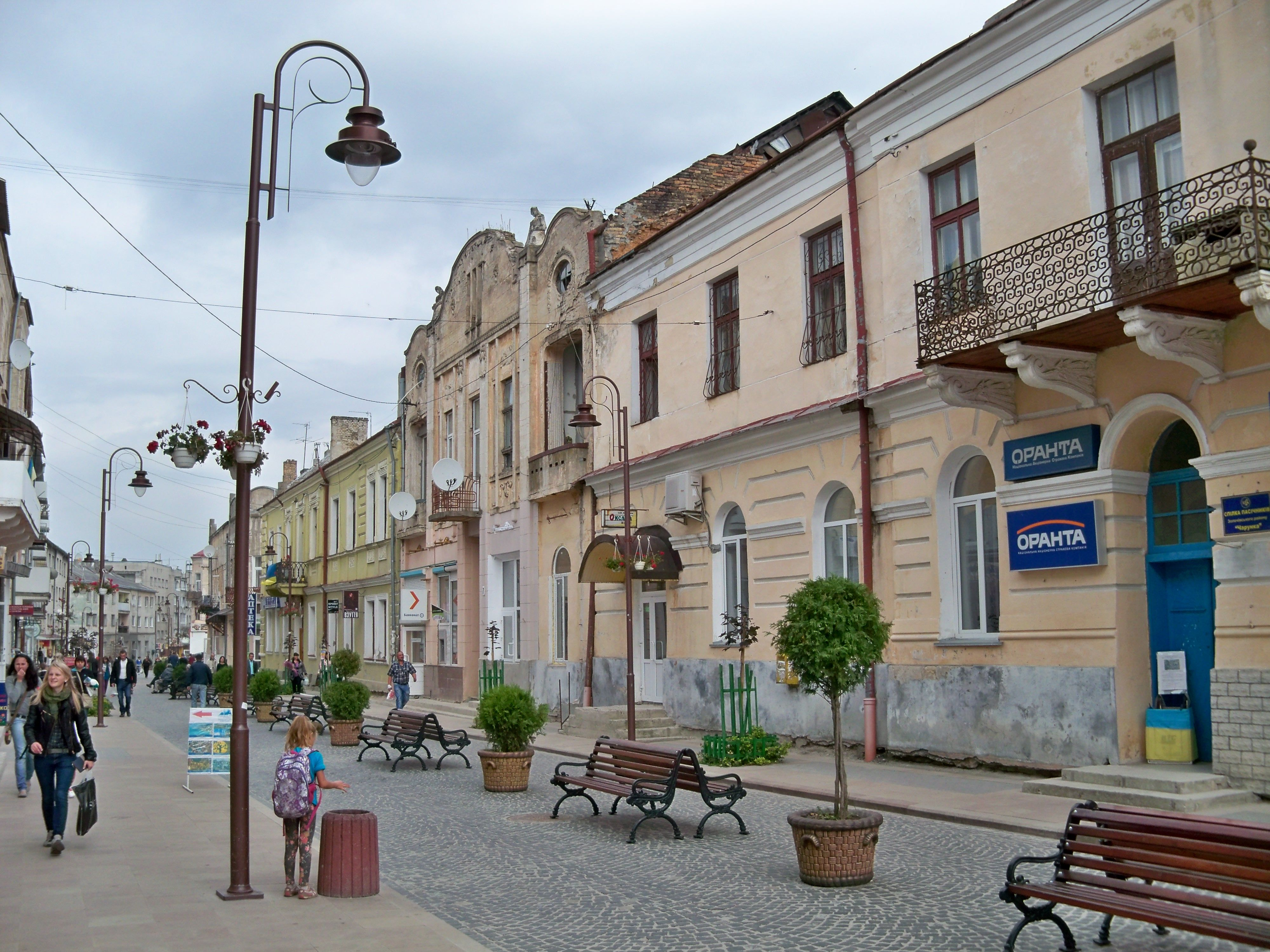
- Downtown Zolochiv

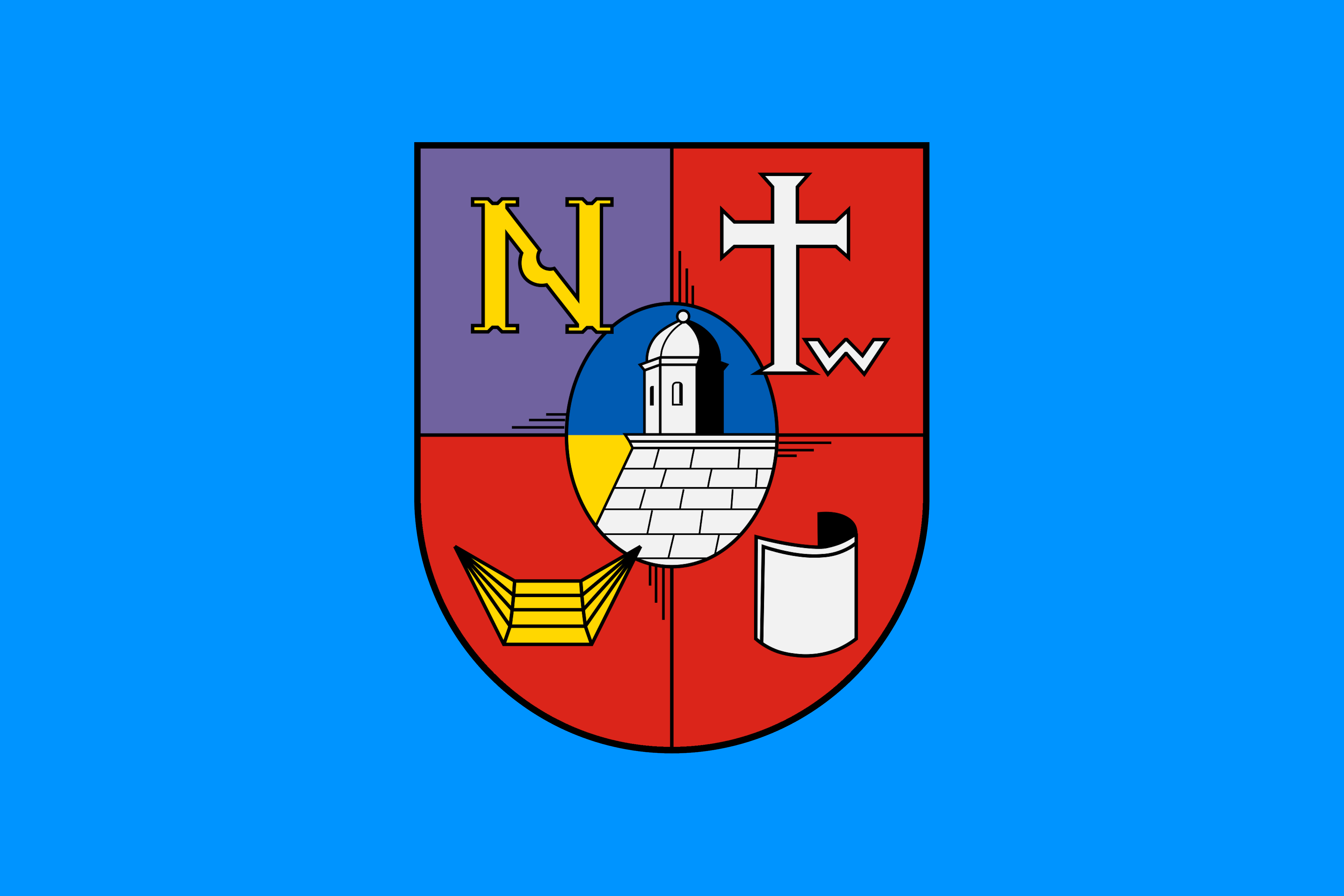
- Flag Coat of arms
- Interactive map of Zolochiv
- Location within Lviv Oblast Location within Ukraine
- Coordinates: 49°48′26.97″N 24°54′11.02″E
- Country: Ukraine
- Oblast: Lviv Oblast
- Raion: Zolochiv Raion
- Hromada: Zolochiv urban hromada
- Founded: 1442

Area
  - Total: 11.64 km^{2} (4.49 sq mi)

Population (2022)
  - Total: 23,912
  - Density: 2,054/km^{2} (5,321/sq mi)
- Time zone: UTC+02:00 (EET)
  - Summer (DST): UTC+03:00 (EEST)
- Postal code: 80700
- Area codes: +380 3265
- Website: zolochiv-rada.org.ua

Zolochiv (Ukrainian: Золочів, IPA: [ˈzɔlotʃiu̯]; Polish: Złoczów; German: Solotschiw; Yiddish: זלאָטשאָוו, romanized: Zlotshov) is a small city in Lviv Oblast, western Ukraine, and the administrative center of Zolochiv Raion. It hosts the administration of Zolochiv urban hromada, one of the hromadas of Ukraine. The city is located 60 kilometres (37 mi) east of Lviv along Highway H02 Lviv-Ternopil and the railway line Krasne-Ternopil. It has a population of 23,912 (2022 estimate), covering an area of 1,164 square kilometres (449 sq mi).

== Geography ==
Zolochiv is located in the upper flow of Buh river, on the edge of Podolian Upland. Brown coal deposits are located in the surrounding area.

== History ==
=== Early history ===
The site was occupied from AD 1180 under the name Radeche until the end of the 13th century when a wooden fort was constructed. This was burned in the 14th century during the invasion of the Crimean Tatars.

In 1442, the city was founded as "Złoczów", by Jan of Sienno, a Polish nobleman of the Dębno family, although the first written mention of Zolochiv was in 1423. The town served as a fortified stronghold and a location of trade fairs.

Zolochiv was incorporated as a town on 15 September 1523 by the Polish king Sigismund I the Old. Located in the Ruthenian Voivodship of the Polish–Lithuanian Commonwealth, it belonged to several noble families.

=== 19th and early 20th century ===
Polish-era arms of the city

From the first partition of Poland in 1772 until 1918, the town was part of the Austrian monarchy (in the Austrian part of the empire after the compromise of 1867). It was the center of one of the 78 Bezirkshauptmannschaften in the Austrian Galicia province in 1900.

From 15 March 1923 until the Invasion of Poland in 1939, when the town was occupied by the Soviet Union, Zolochiv, still named Złoczów, belonged to the Tarnopol Voivodship of the Second Republic of Poland.

=== World War Two ===
Zolochiv was occupied by the USSR from September 1939 to July 1941. At the Zolochiv prison they committed horrific atrocities against Ukrainian nationalists including priests.

After July 1941, Zolochiv was occupied by Germany and incorporated into the General Government in the District of Galicia.

On 27 June, the town and its surrounding vicinity was bombed by the Germans, causing panic.

On 1 July the Germans arrived in the town. Rumours had been circulating of a massacre in the Old Polish Prison on Ternopil Street. Many Ukrainian locals were able to identify their friends and loved ones amongst the victims. Several rows of corpses were lined up in a pit in the prison yard that was encrusted with blood and human flesh. People repeated that the NKVD had been running tractor engines during the massacre to quiet the noise of those being tortured.

Those clearing the yard had to work quickly, as due to the summer heat the bodies were decomposing and there was a risk of disease spreading. Inside the prison cells, Greek-Catholic priests were found with crosses carved into their chests. In one cell a pool of coagulated blood lay with numerous corpses that had been severely tortured.

One of the local Jews, named Shmulko, who had worked in the flour mill before the war but had joined the NKVD and worked at the prison upon the Soviet invasion, was captured near Sasiv. The individual was forced to show people the corpses of their relatives and friends and was then stoned to death. Before he died, he confessed to a second burial pit that people had suspected but could not find.

The Germans forced local Jews to clear the prison and clean the bodies of those killed and place them outside of the prison for further identification. After that, SS troops executed those Jewish people. No Ukrainians participated in those atrocities.

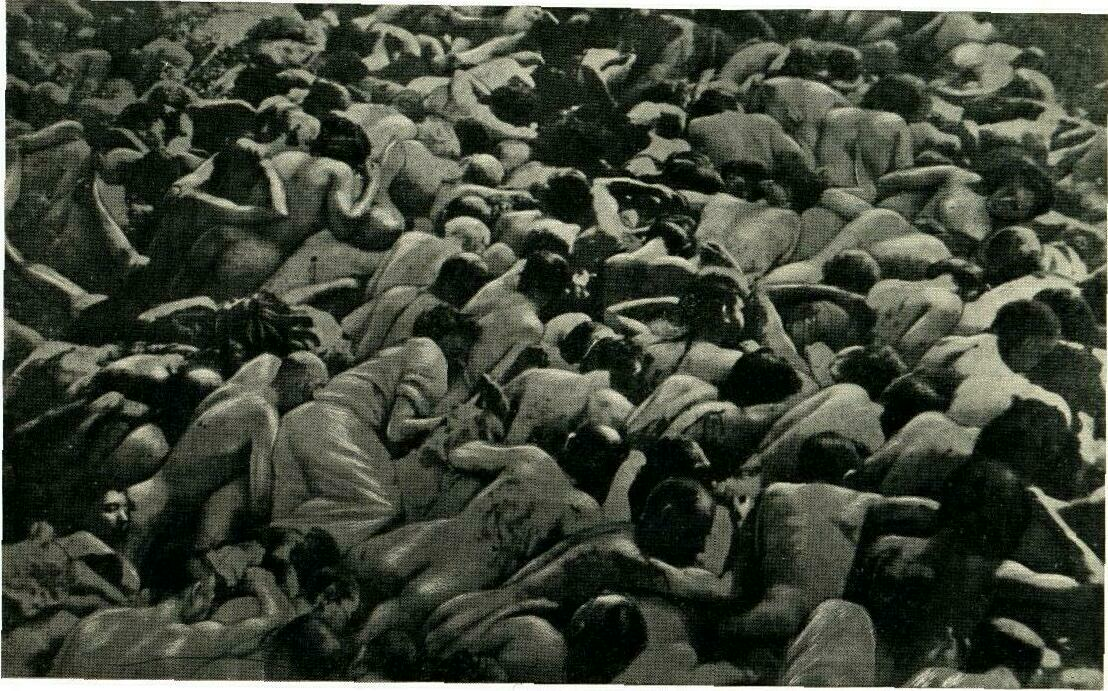
German photograph of Jews killed in mass grave at Zolochiv about 1941. Found by the Soviets in Zolochiv's Gestapo headquarters when the city was liberated in July 1944

According to a German Einsatzgruppen report in Zolochiv "before the Russians fled . . . they arrested and killed in all about 700 Ukrainians. In retribution, the militia arrested several hundred Jews and shot them, on instructions from the Wehrmacht. The number of Jews killed was between 300 and 500." Then the killing spread beyond the fortress where the Ukrainians and Jews were shot. Within three to four days, around 1400 Jews had been killed. Later the Germans shot another 300.

Once they established their occupation administration, the Germans began to rob and persecute the Jews, including forcing them to do slave labor. The Germans also confiscated their homes and valuables. In August 1942, the Germans with the assistance of the Ukrainian police, rounded up about 2000 Jews and sent them to Belzec where they were immediately murdered. In November, the German and Ukrainian police rounded up another 2500 and sent them to be murdered in Belzec. Other Jews were shot in Zolochiv. After that, the Germans established a ghetto to which Zolochiv Jews were confined along with Jews from other villages who had been sent there. The ghetto, containing about 4000 people, was severely overcrowded and lacked sanitary facilities. Consequently, a typhus epidemic broke out. In April 1943, about 3500 Jews were taken by German and Ukrainian police to be shot at a pit near the village of Yelykhovychi. One German official, Josef Meyer, tried to protect Jews, hiding several. After the war, Yad Vashem awarded him, his wife and two daughters the title Righteous Among the Nations.

There are numerous recorded cases of local Ukrainians sheltering Jews within the town of Zolochiv and the surrounding provinces. The number of Jewish survivors is unknown.

In the spring of 1942, guerrillas from the Organization of Ukrainian Nationalists (OUN) ambushed a Nazi transportation of livestock to the Reich, killing one or more Nazis. There were immediate reprisals on local Ukrainian nationalists. The Gestapo was vigilant and focused on eliminating the OUN within and around Zolochiv. Numerous Ukrainian nationalists, including Ivan Lahola, Bohdan Kachur and Stepan Petelycky, were imprisoned in the Gestapo headquarters in Zolochiv and were later transported to Lącki prison in Lviv.

On 1 December 1942 a ghetto was established. Confined within the ghetto was a brewery where beer continued to be produced. Between 7,500 and 9,000 people were imprisoned there, as well as remnants of communities of the surrounding areas, including Olesko, Sasiv, and Bilyi Kamin. The ghetto was liquidated on 2 April 1943, and 6,000 people were murdered in a mass execution perpetrated by an Einsatzgruppen at a pit near the village of Yelykhovychi.

=== Soviet period ===
From July 1944 to 16 August 1945, the town was occupied by the Red Army.

After the Yalta Conference of February 1945, an agreement between the USSR and the Provisional Government of National Unity in Poland was signed on 16 August 1945, recognizing a slightly modified version of the Curzon line as the eastern border of Poland. This was based on an earlier agreement between Soviet authorities and the Polish Committee of National Liberation Government on 27 July 1944. Thus, Zolochiv was included in the Ukrainian Soviet Socialist Republic in the USSR, where it remained until 1991.

In 1956 the population of Zolochiv comprised around 11,000 inhabitants.

=== Independent Ukraine ===
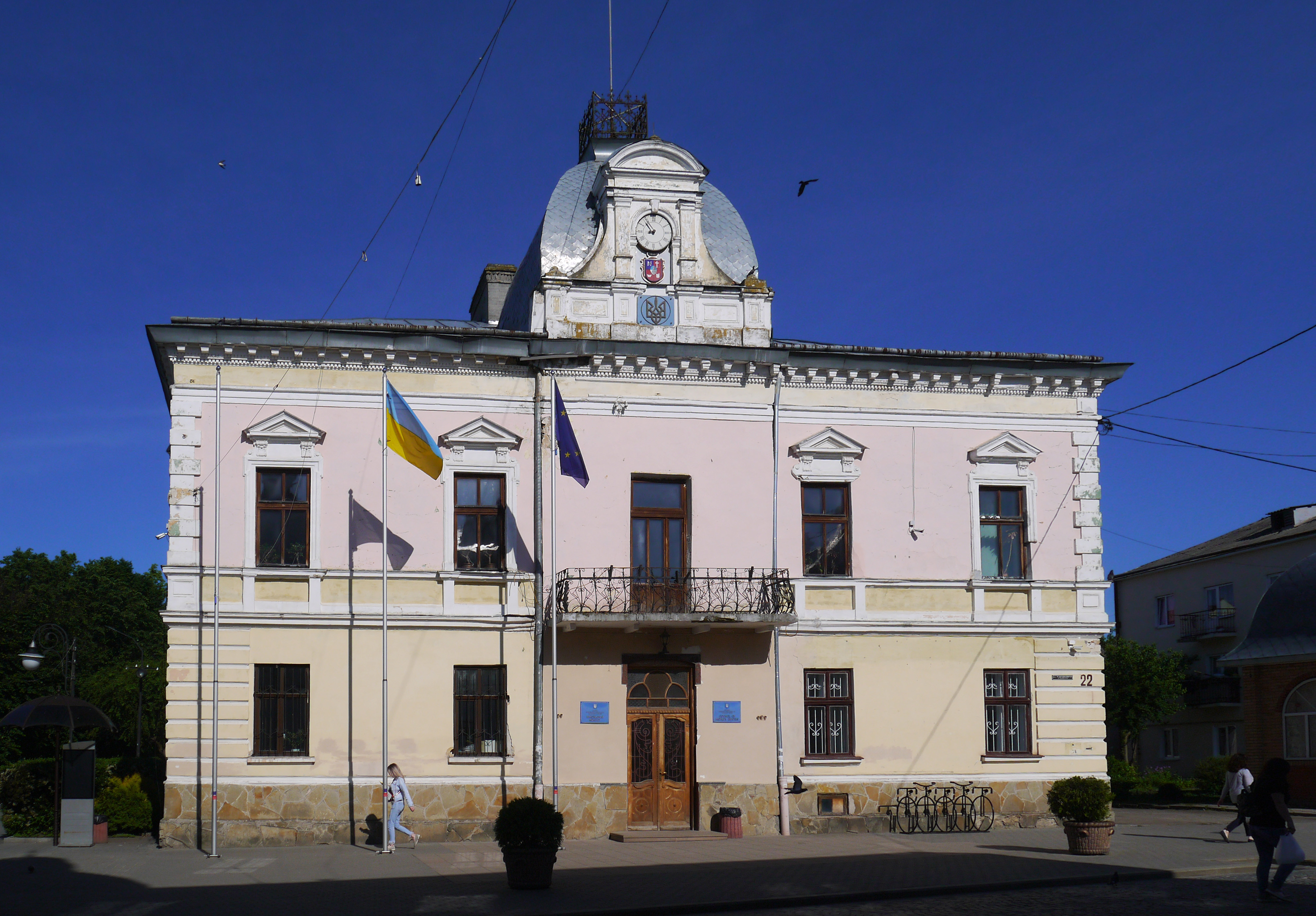
Modern view of Zolochiv city hall

Since 1991, Zolochiv has been part of independent Ukraine. On July 17, 2007, a man-made disaster occurred near Ozhydiv, 20 km from Zolochiv, when 50 meters of railroad track, about 100 meters of the contact network and three power poles were damaged as a result of a tanker derailment. The fire was extinguished by a cloud of combustion products (the affected area is about 90 km^{2}). Evacuation from the affected area began. First, people from the nearest villages were evacuated, and others were evacuated on request. The situation was complicated by the fact that phosphorus cannot be extinguished with water.

On March 28, 2014, a living alley in memory of the Heavenly Hundred appeared in front of the administrative building of the Zolochiv District Council.

On June 9, 2015, a decision was made in Zolochiv to rename Tchaikovsky Street to Heavenly Hundred Heroes Street. The decision was voted for by 23 members of the city council. P. Tchaikovsky Street runs past Zolochiv School No. 1 and rests on a linden alley planted in front of the district state administration in honor of the Heroes of the Heavenly Hundred. By the way, Heavenly Hundred Heroes Street is located next to the Zolochiv Maidan, where the Viche took place during the Revolution of Dignity.

On June 14, 2022, during the Russian invasion of Ukraine, Zolochiv was hit by a missile attack. The missile (probably a Kalibr) was shot down by air defense systems, but the debris fell on the territory of the city, destroying a brick-making company and damaging nearby houses. Six people (including a one-year-old child) were also injured.

== Architectural landmarks ==
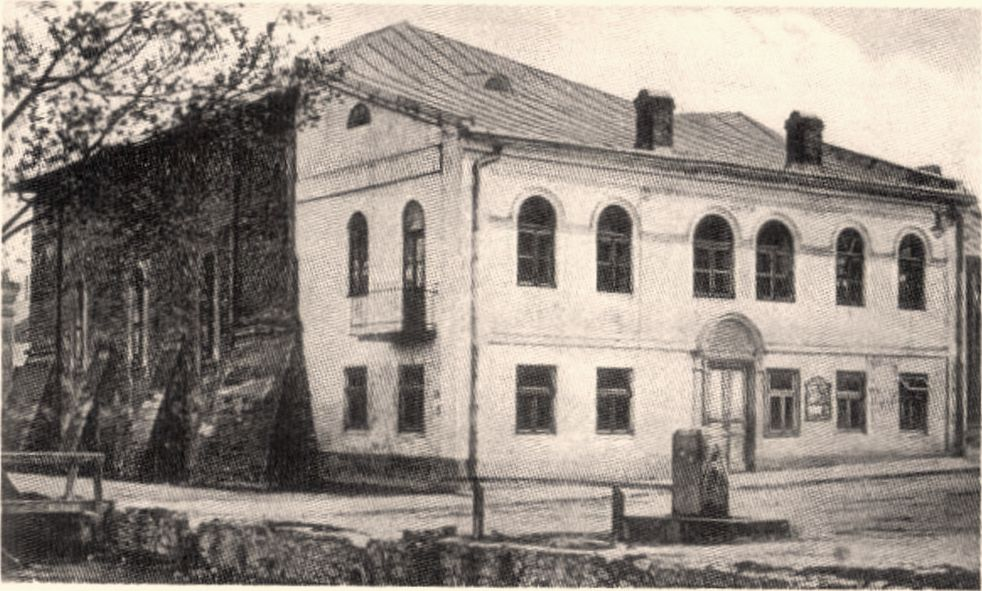
Zolochiv Great Synagogue during the early 20th century

- Zolochiv Castle, built in the early 17th century by Jakub Sobieski
- Saint Nicholas Church (late 16th century)
- Parish church (early 17th century)

=== Destroyed ===
- Stone Synagogue, 1724 (destroyed during World War II)

== Notable people ==
In chronological order:

- John III Sobieski (1629–1696), king of Poland and Grand Duke of Lithuania
- Katarzyna Sobieska (1634–1694), sister of John III Sobieski
- James Sobieski (1667–1737), Polish prince
- Yechiel Michel of Zloczow (1726–1786), Jewish rabbi
- Ignacy Zaborowski (1754–1803), Polish mathematician and geodesist
- Zev Wolf of Zbaraz (died 1822), rabbi
- Naphtali Herz Imber (1856–1909), Jewish poet, wrote lyrics of Hatikvah, the national anthem of Israel
- Moyshe-Leyb Halpern (1886–1932), Yiddish writer
- Tadeusz Brzeziński (1896–1990), Polish diplomat, father of Zbigniew Brzezinski
- Abraham Shalit (1898–1979), Jewish historian, studied in Vienna, worked in Mandate Palestine/Israel
- Arthur (Usher) Fellig (1899–1968), photographer, best known for his New York photos
- Ilya Schor (1904–1961), painter, jeweler, engraver, and artist of Judaica; lived in Europe and the US
- Jan Cieński (1905–1992), Roman Catholic bishop; worked in part clandestinely during Soviet era
- Marian Iwańciów (1906–1971), painter
- Carlos Feller (1923–2018), born Kalman Felberbaum; opera singer, emigrated in 1929 to Argentina
- Roald Hoffmann (born 1937), Polish-American chemist, 1981 laureate of the Nobel Prize in Chemistry
- Andriy Husin (1972–2014), Ukrainian football player
- Josephine Jackson (born 1995), pornographic film actress and model

== Gallery ==
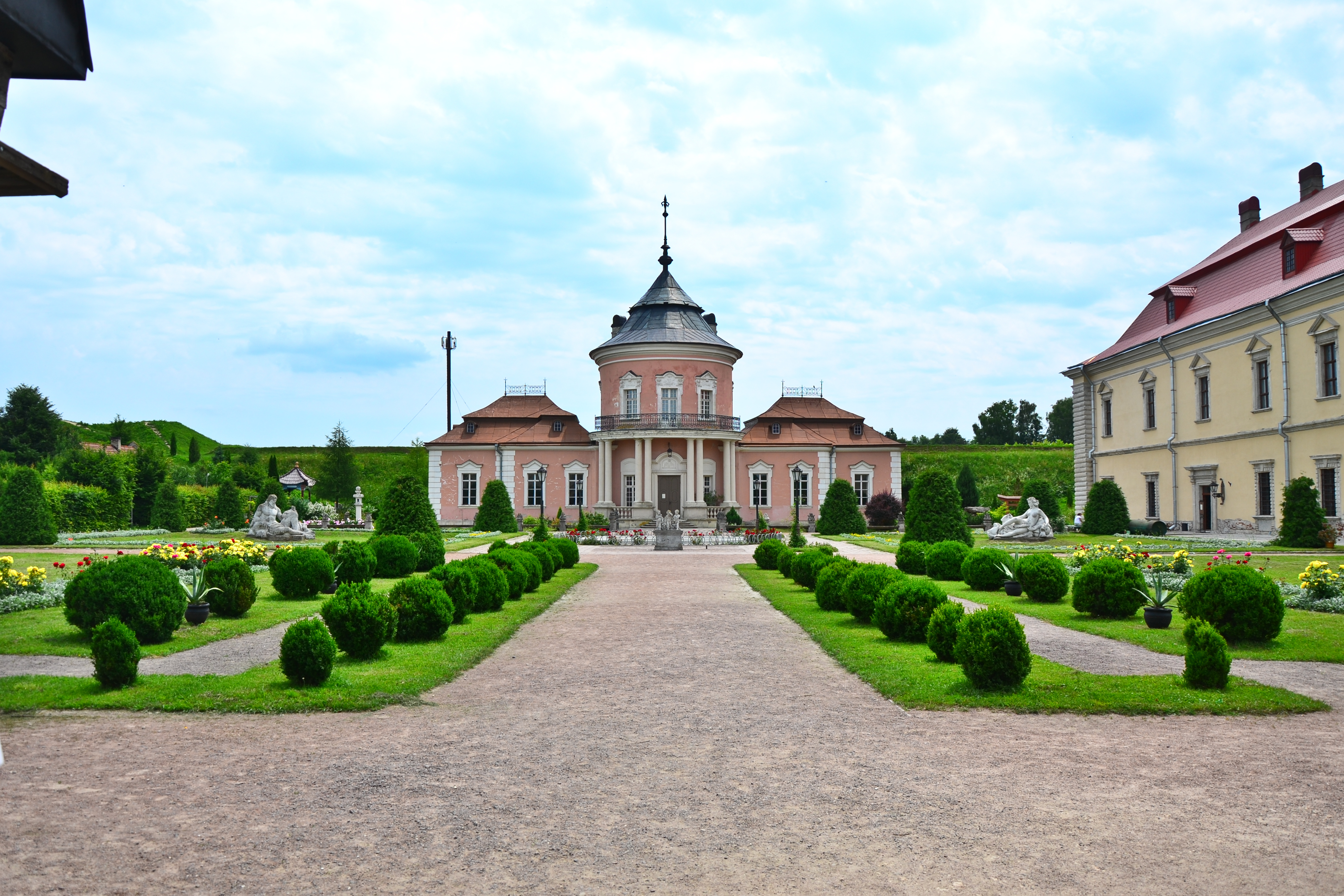
Zolochiv Castle

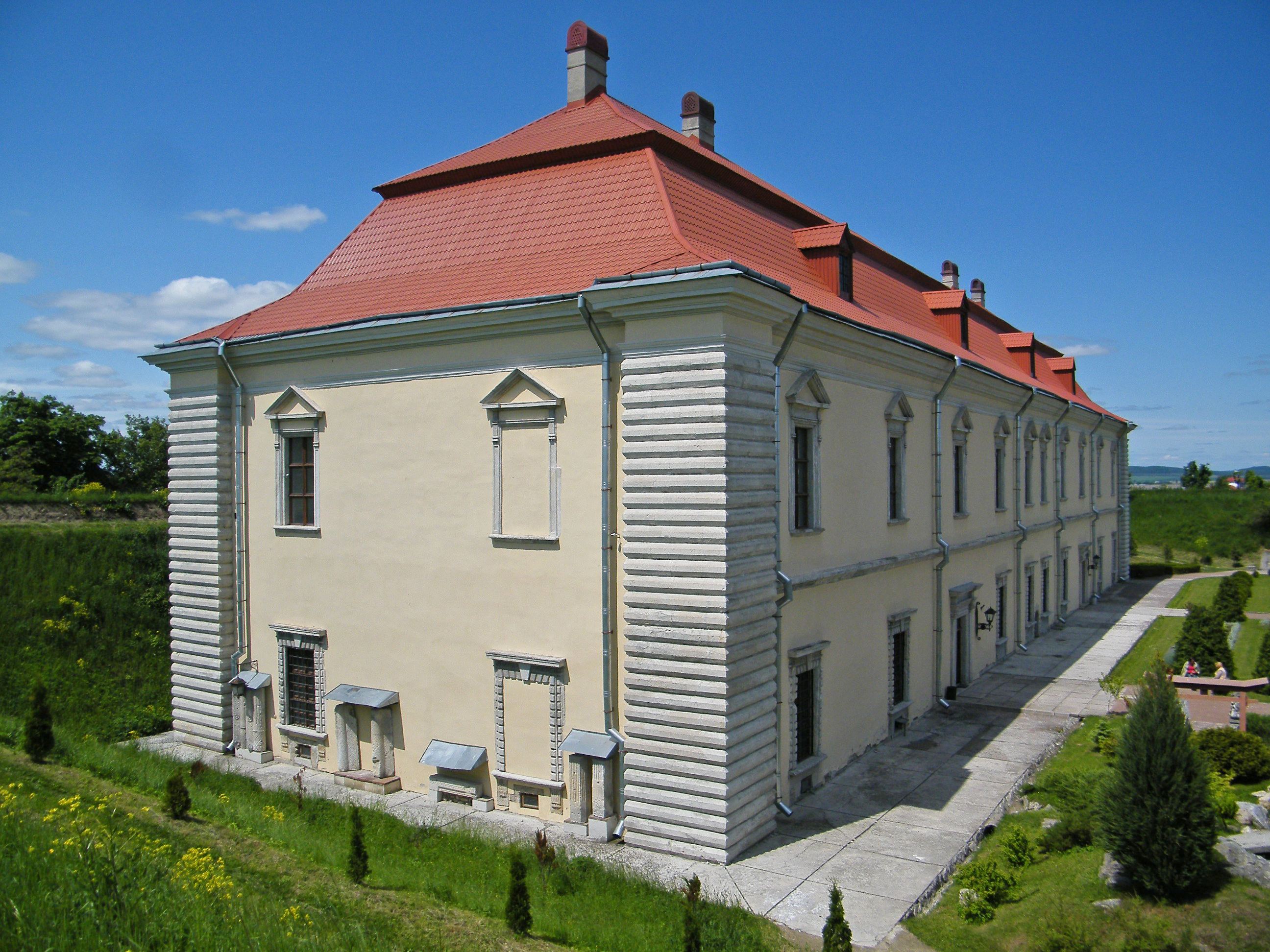
Great Palace of Zolochiv Castle

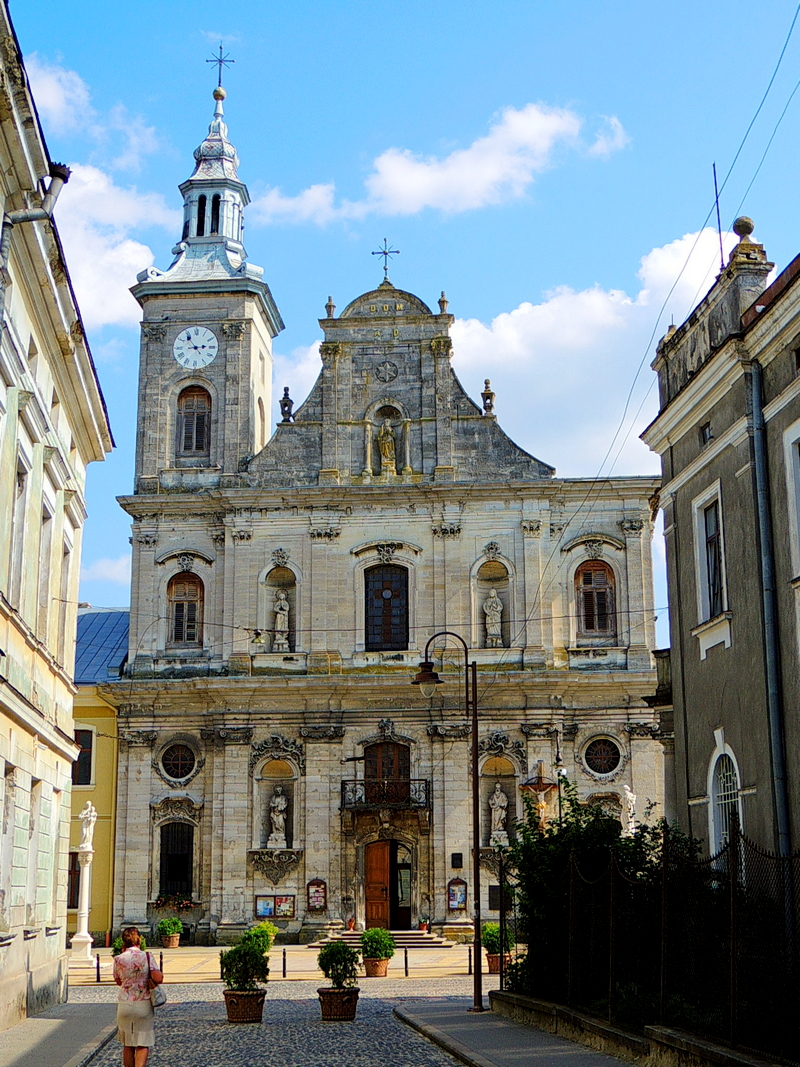
Church of the Assumption

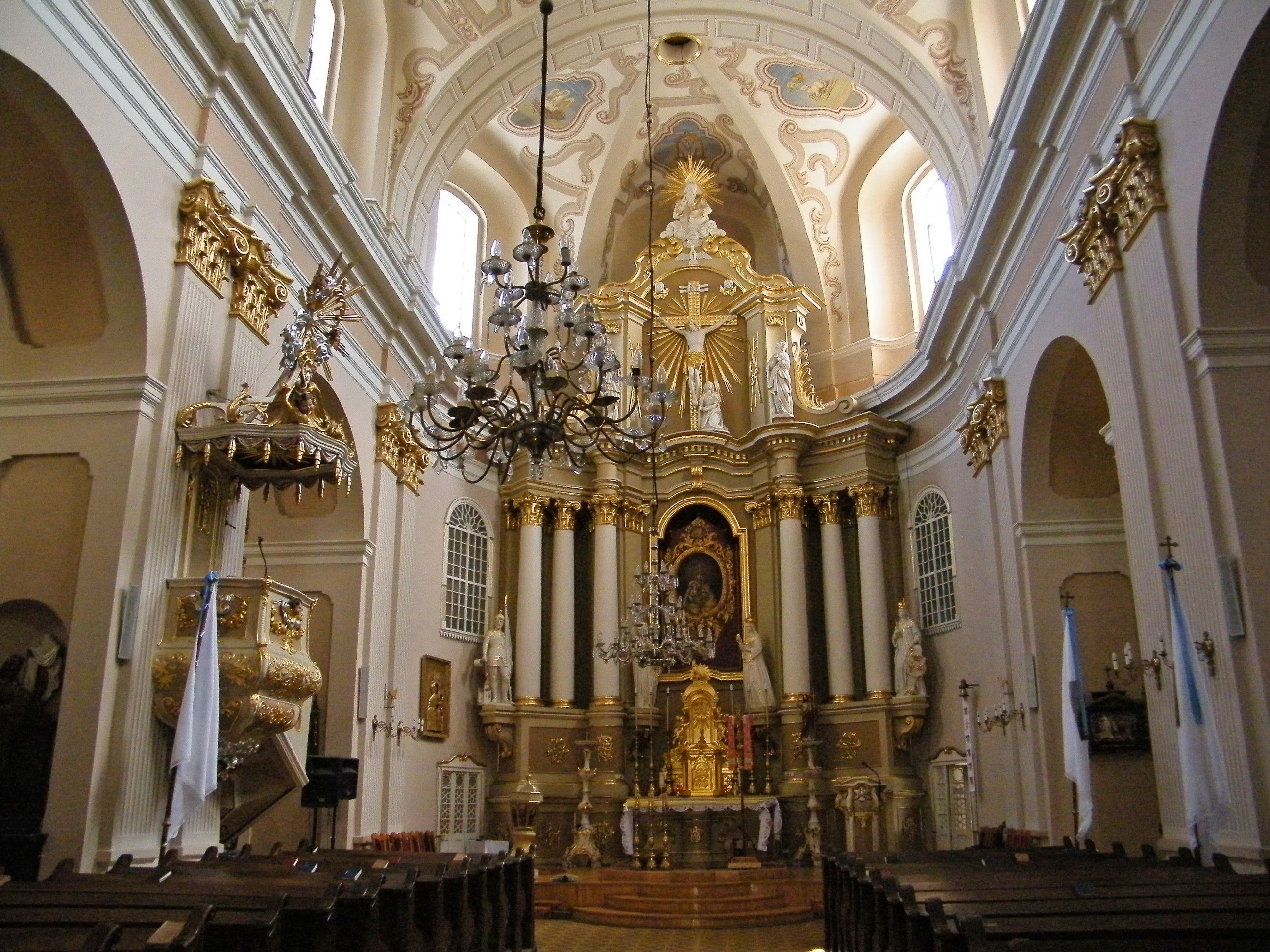
Interior of the Assumption Church

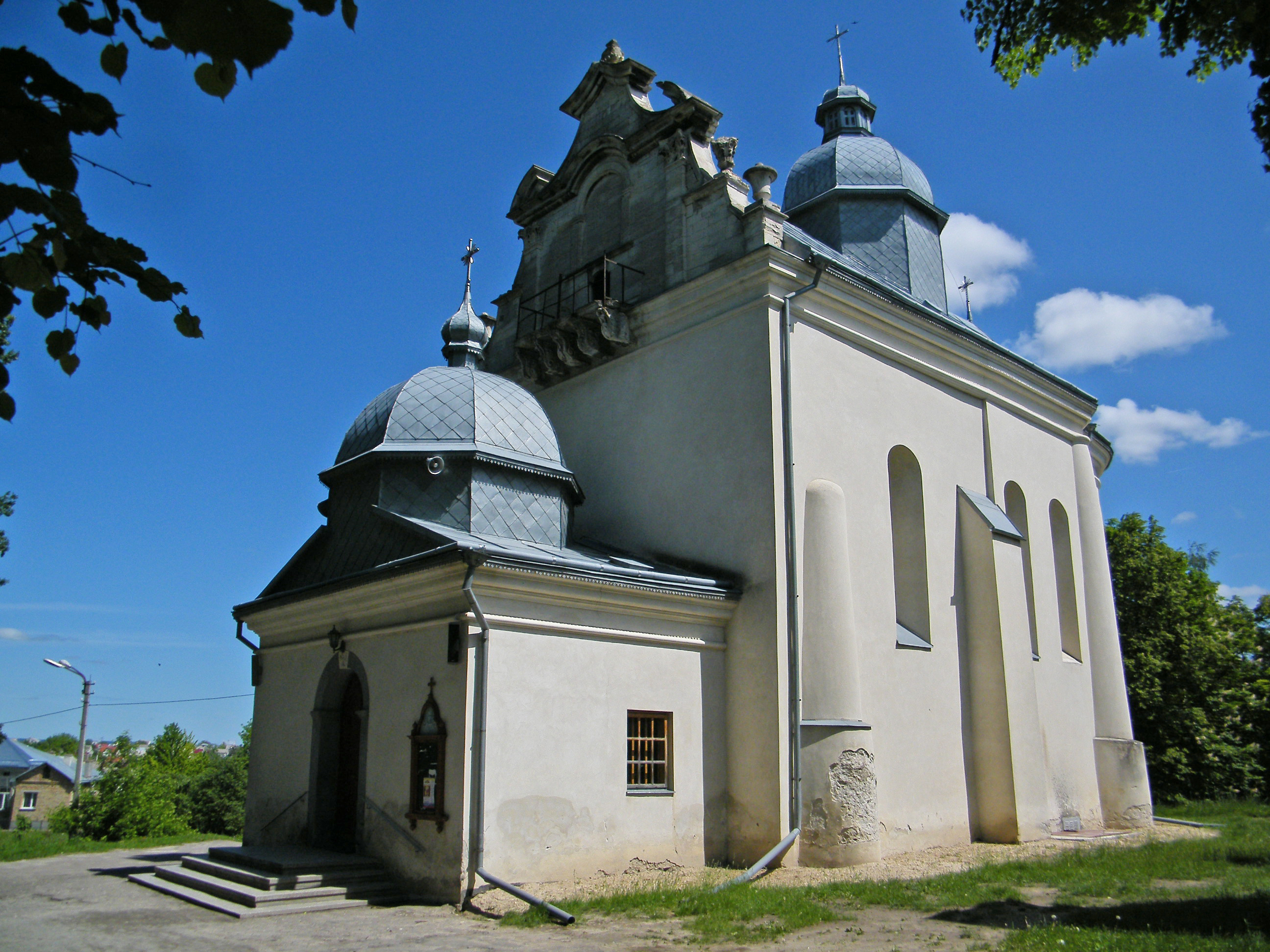
St. Nicholas Church

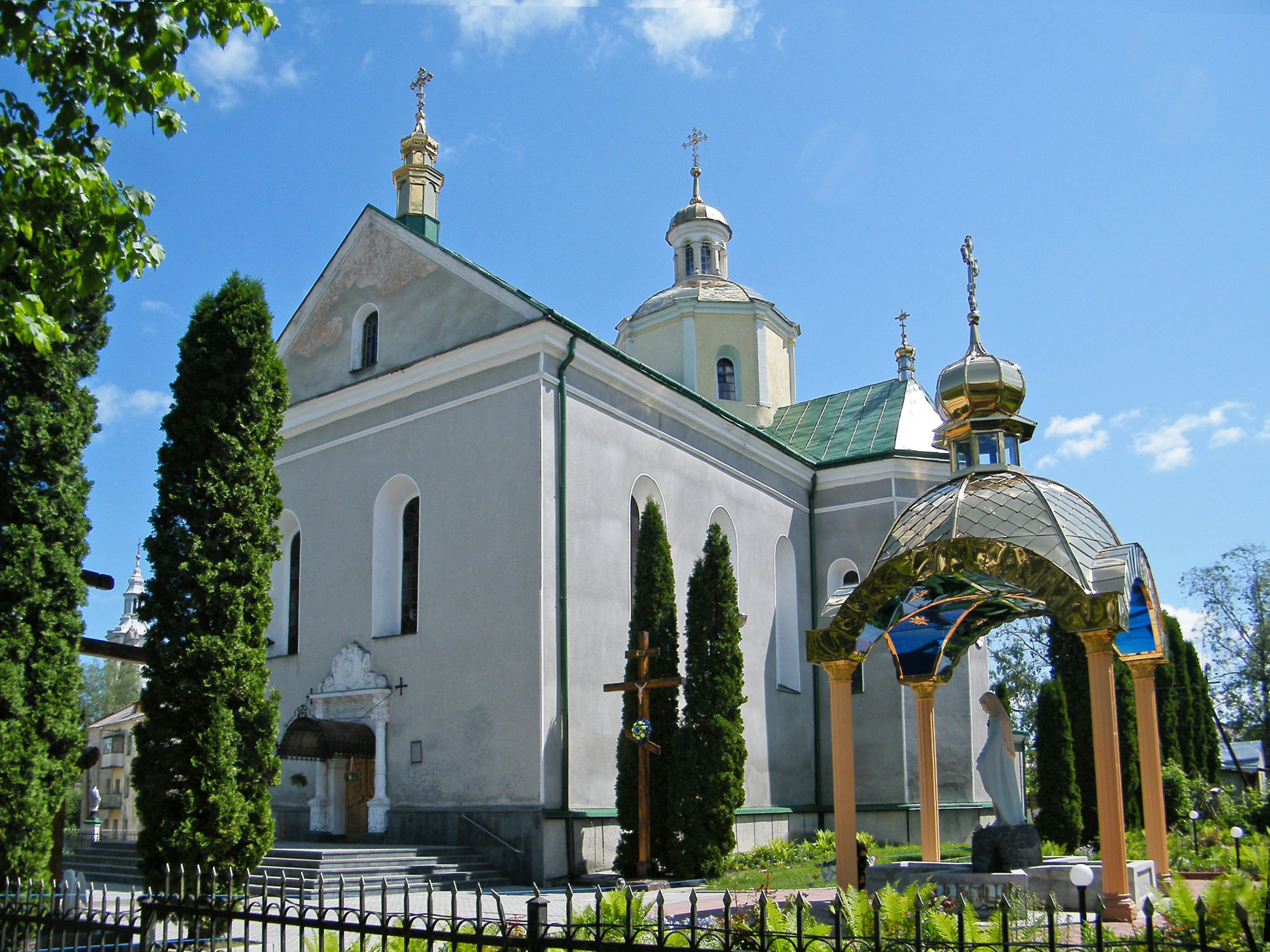
Church of the Resurrection

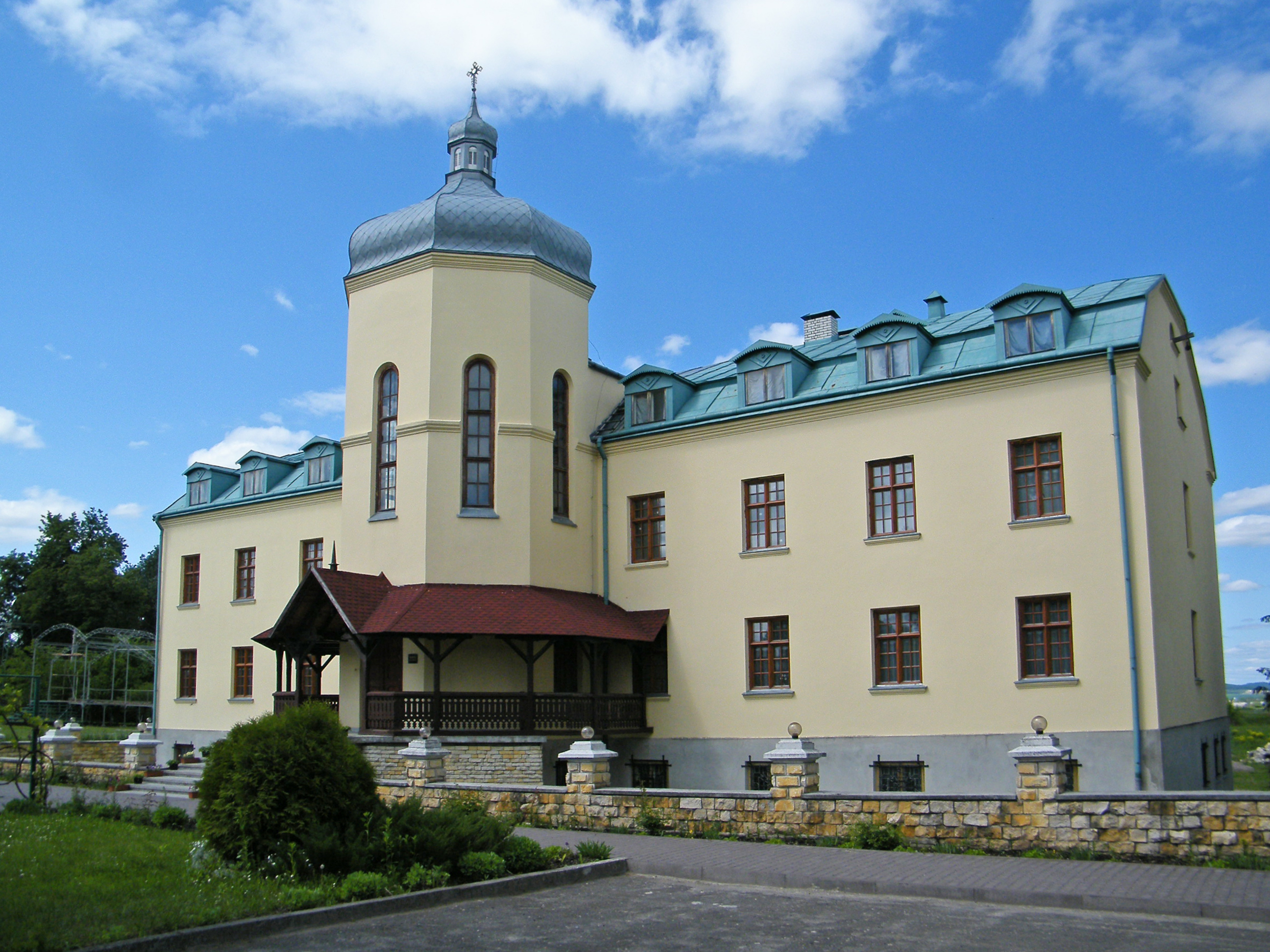
Monastery of the Order of Saint Basil the Great

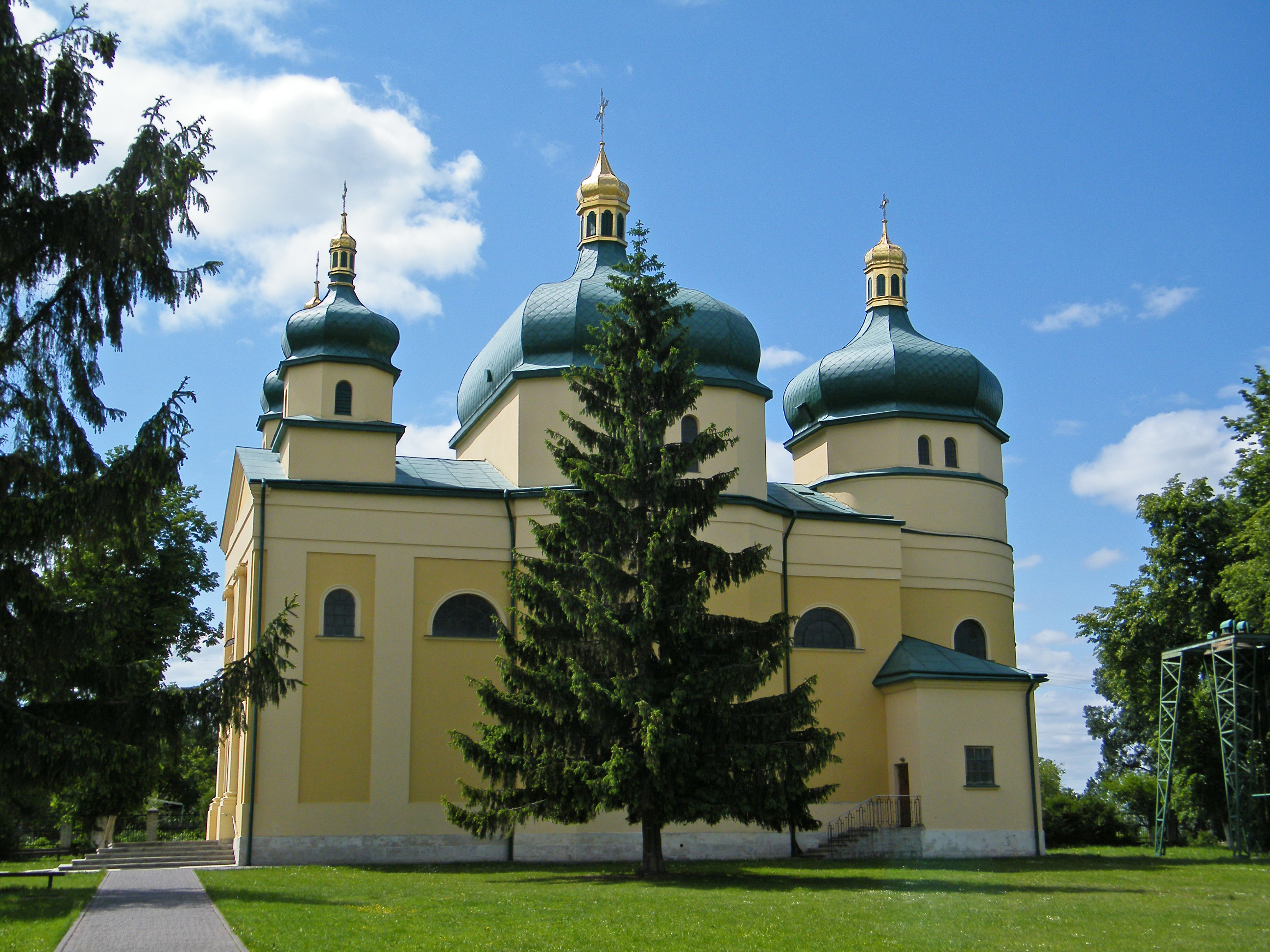
Church of the Ascension

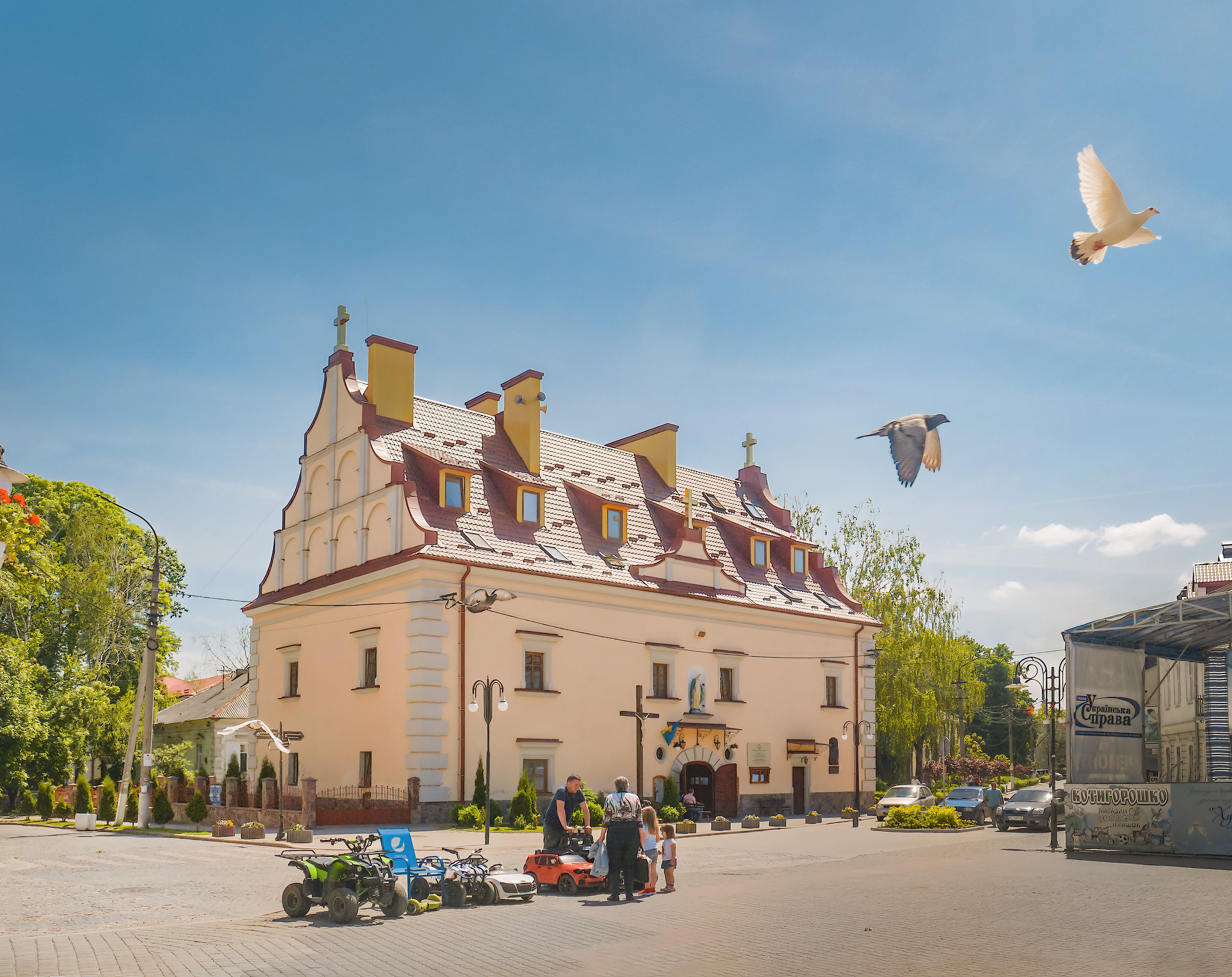
Former hospital

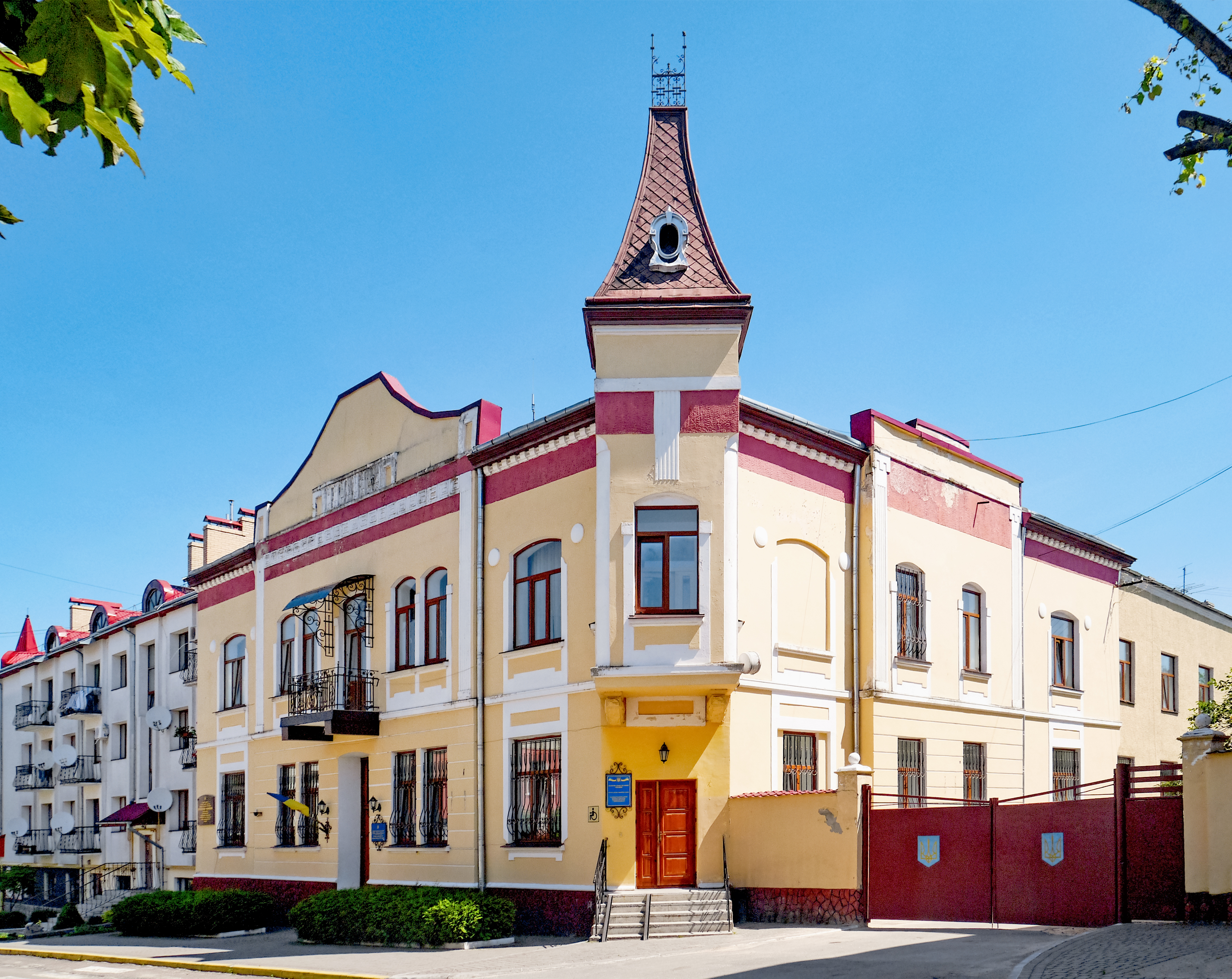
Administrative building

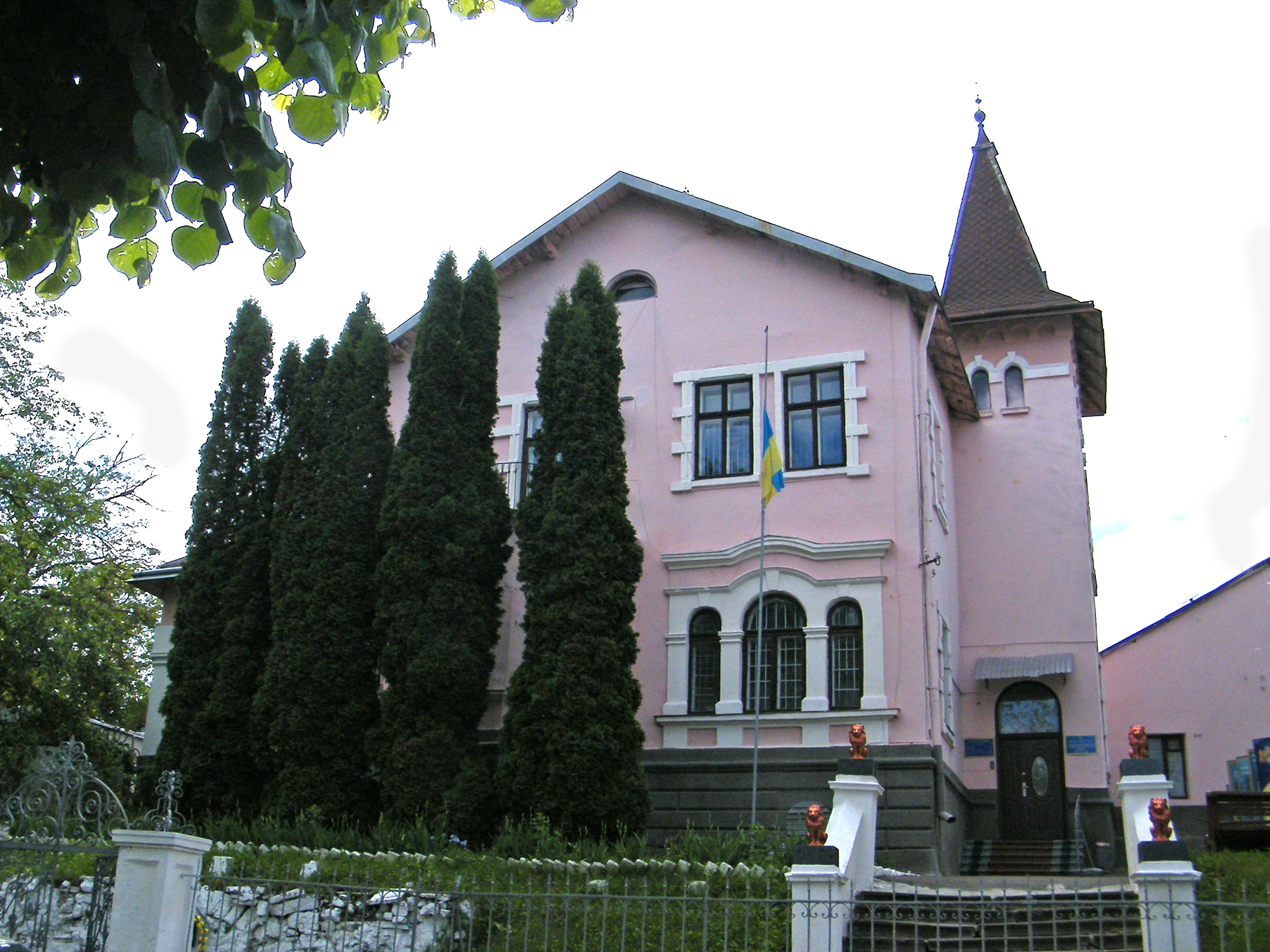
Military commissariat building

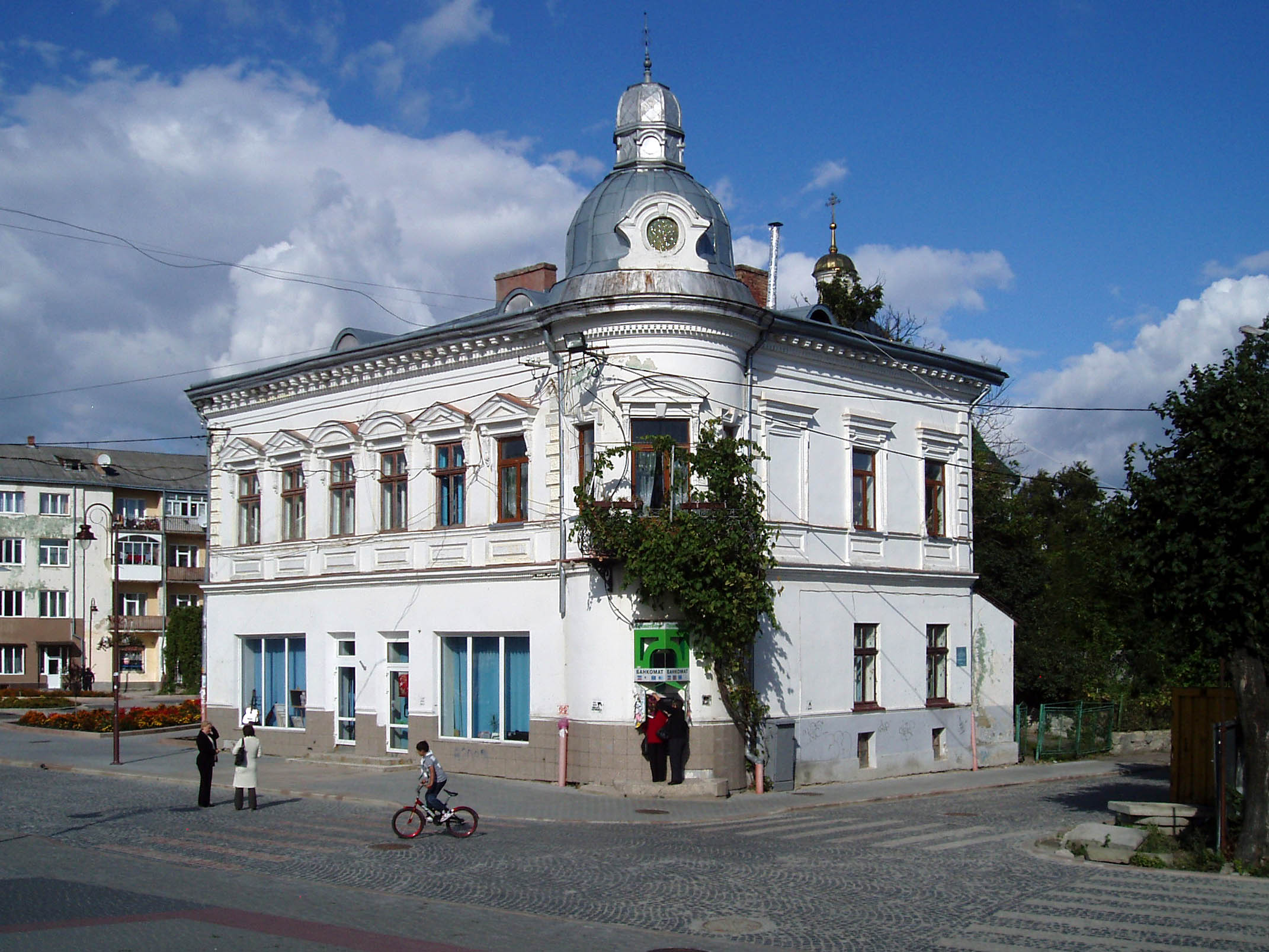
Residential building at Shashkevycha Street, 11

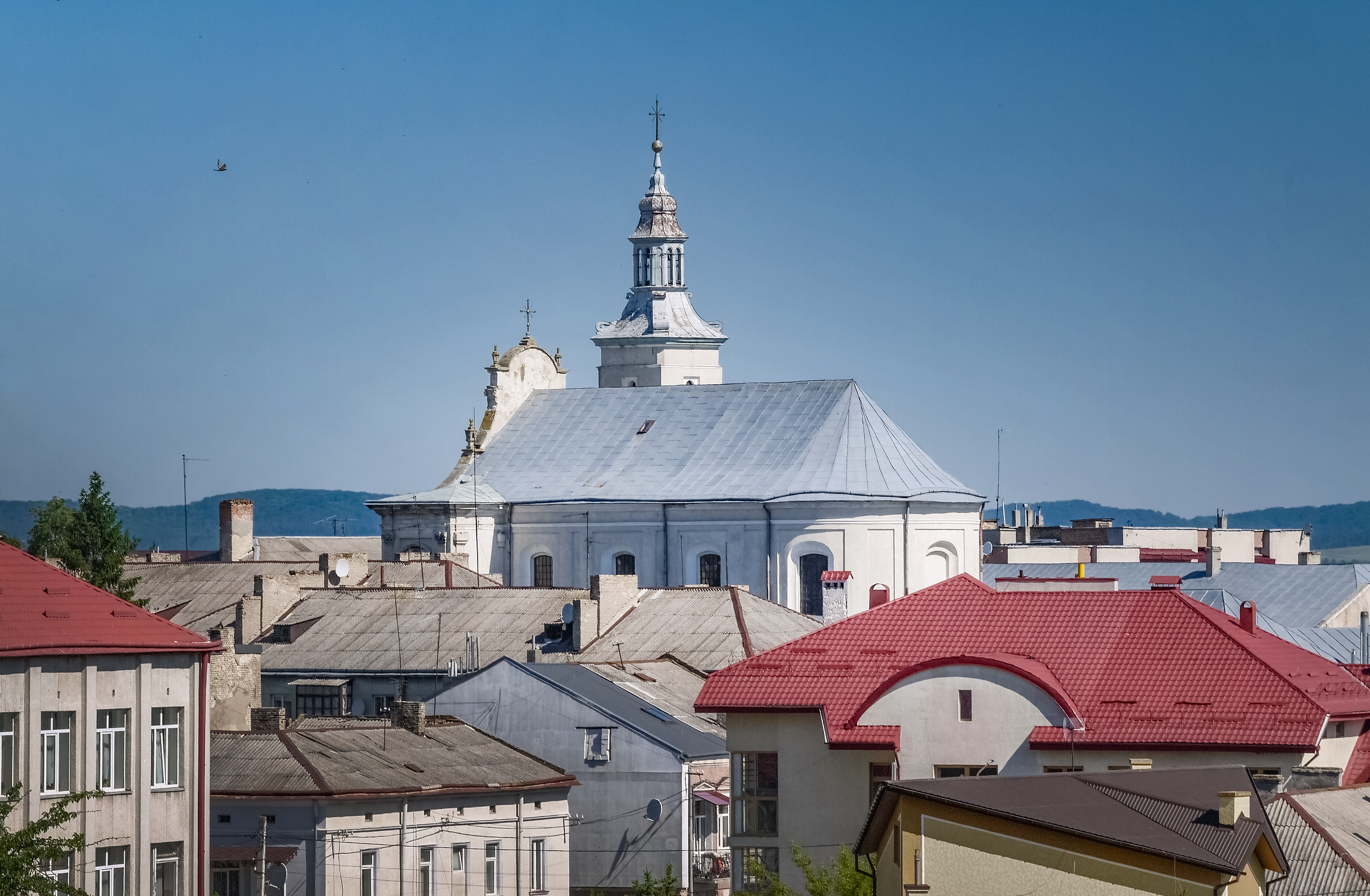
Old town with the Assumption Church

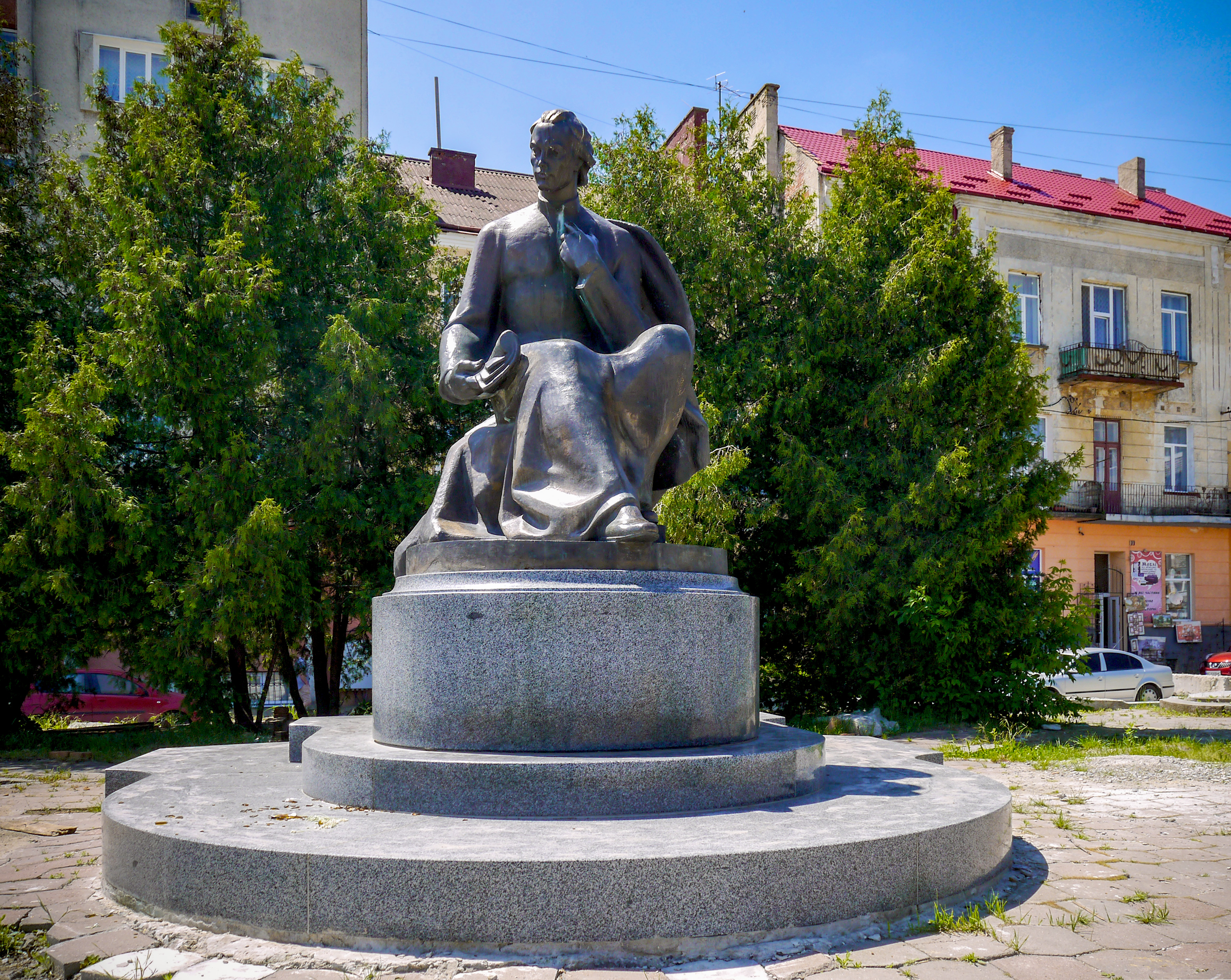
Markiyan Shashkevych monument
