= Old Wilanów =

Neighbourhood of Warsaw, Poland

- Neighbourhood
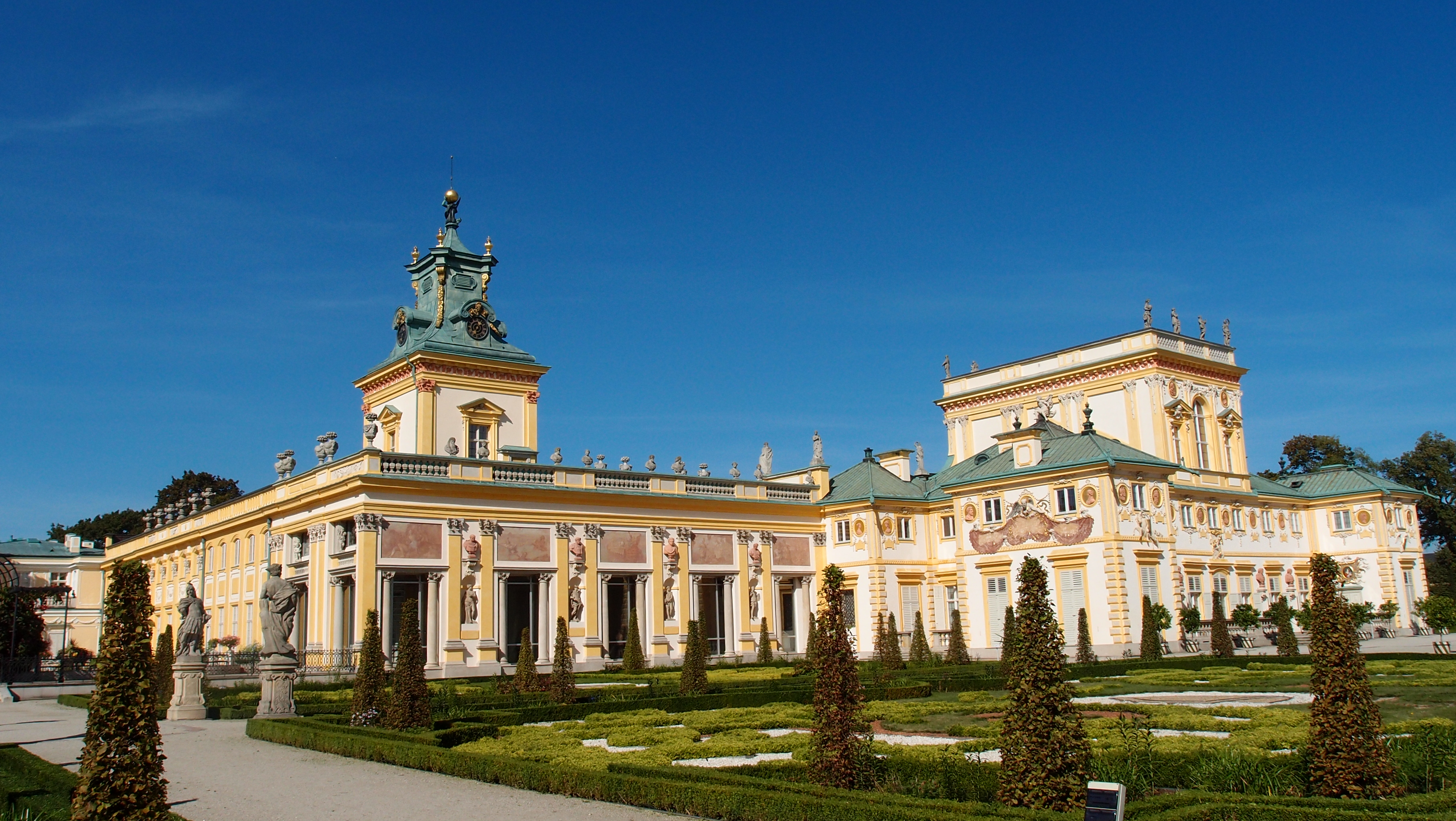
- The Wilanów Palace.
- Interactive map of Old Wilanów
- Coordinates: 52°09′56″N 21°05′23″E
- Country: Poland
- Voivodeship: Masovian
- City and county: Warsaw
- District: Wilanów
- CIS areas: Wilanów Królewski; Wilanów Niski; Wilanów Wysoki
- Time zone: UTC+1 (CET)
  - Summer (DST): UTC+2 (CEST)
- Area code: +48 22

Old Wilanów (Polish: Stary Wilanów [ˈsta.rɘ̟ viˈla.nuf]) is a neighbourhood in Warsaw, Poland, within the northeastern portion of the Wilanów district. It is divided between the City Information System areas of Wilanów Królewski, Wilanów Niski, and Wilanów Wysoki. Its eastern portion is a residential area with low-rise single-family houses and mid-rise apartment buildings. The neighbourhood features the Wilanów Palace, a Baroque royal residence, built in 1696, for John III Sobieski, the King of Poland and grand duke of Lithuania. Currently it houses the King John III Museum in Wilanów, and includes a large Italian garden, with an area of 24 ha, known as the Wilanów Garden. The area also includes the St. Anne Collegiate Church, a Renaissance Revival Roman Catholic parish church dating to 1870, and the Poster Museum, a branch of the Warsaw National Museum, dedicated to the history of the poster design. Northeastern portion of the neighbourhood features the Morysin landscape park and nature reserve, majority of which is covered by a riparian forest. It also includes the Wilanów Lake and Wilanówka river.

Relicts of a human settlement were discovered in the area, dating to between 150 and 50 BCE. The oldest records of Wilanów, known until the 16th century as Milanów, date to the 13th century. In the 14th century, a Roman Catholic church eas built in the village. In 1338, the settlement became a property of duke Trojeden I, the ruler of the Duchy of Czersk, and was later given to knight Stanisław of Strzelczyków in the second half of the century. In 1677, the village was acquired by John III Sobieski, the King of Poland and Grand Duke of Lithuania, who, between 1681 and 1696, built there his residence, in the form of the Wilanów Palace, designed by Augustyn Wincenty Locci in the Baroque style. The estate was later owned by Czartoryski, Lubomirski, Potocki, and Branicki families. Between 1772 and 1775, the St. Anne Church was built next to the palace, replacing the former Roman Catholic temple in the village. It was later rebuilt between 1857 and 1870 in the Renaissance Revival style. In 1805, the King John III Museum in Wilanów was founded in the palace complex, becoming the second public museum in Poland. In the 19th century, a large park complex known as Morysin, was developed to the east of the Wilanów Palace, in a riparian forest. In 1867, Wilanów became the seat of the eponymous municipality, which also included the surrounding settlements. In 1892, the Warszawa Wilanów railway station was opened in the village, as part of the Wilanów Railway, which operated until 1971. In 1945, the Wilanów Palace, together with its landed estate, were nationalised by the Polish government. Wilanów was incorporated into Warsaw in 1951. In 1962, the Poster Museum was founded in Wilanów, becoming the first museum in the world, dedicated to the poster design. From 1972 to 1979, two housing estates were developed in the area, consisting of apartment buildings constructed with the large panel system technique. In the 1980s, a third housing estate was built to the southeast, with some of its majority of its apartments being assigned to the politicians of the Polish United Workers' Party, leading it becoming known as the Bay of Red Pigs.

== Toponomy ==
The name Wilanów was coined in the 16th century, as a Polonised borrowing of a Latin name Villa Nova, meaning "new village", which was used to refer to one of the residences in the area. Previously, the settlement was known as Milanów and Milanowo, with records of the name dating to the 13th century. The modern neighbourhood is referred to as Old Wilanów (Polish: Stary Wilanów), as a historical location of the village with said name, within a larger city district of Wilanów.

== History ==
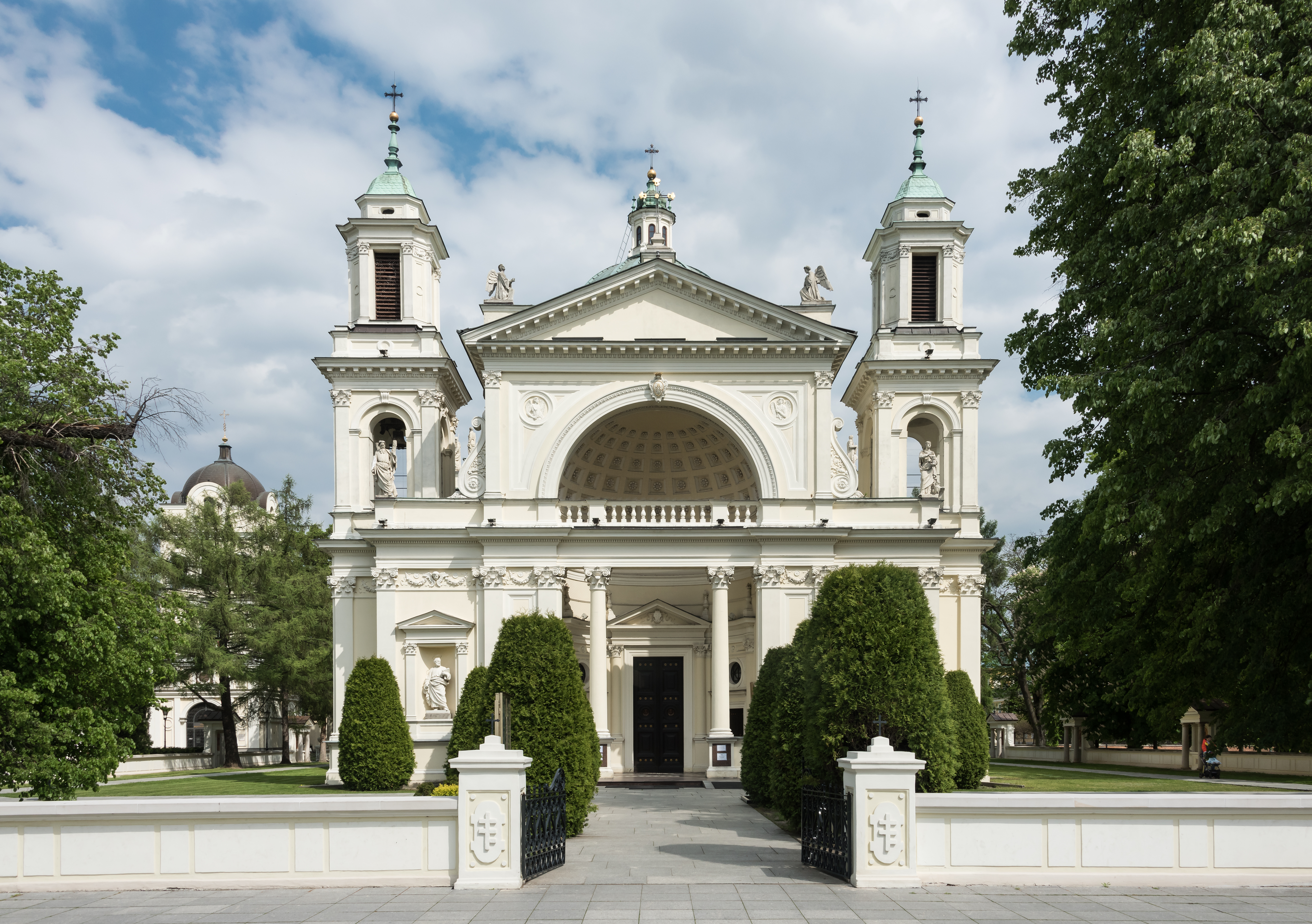
The St. Anne Collegiate Church, consecrated in its current form in 1870, as a seat of a Roman Catholic parish dating to the 13th century.

The oldest archeological evidence of human settlements in the area date to between 150 and 50 BCE. Relicts of a human settlement, present in the area from the turn of the 12th to the 13th century, were discovered at the intersection of Sobieskiego Street, and Wilanowska Avenue, during the archeologist excavation conducted between 1976 and 1978. Forty objects were found, including huts with hearths, and farm buildings.

The oldest known records of the village of Milanów (also known as Milanowo), located in the northern portion of the modern Wilanów district, date back to the 13th century. At the time, the settlement was owned by the Benedictine abbey in Płock, which founded there the Roman Catholic Parish of Saint Nicholas. In the 14th century, it founded a constitution of a wooden temple, named the St. Leonard Church. In 1338, the village became the property of duke Trojden I, the ruler of the Duchy of Czersk. In the second half of the 14th century, the village was given to knight Stanisław of Strzelczyków, for his service to the duke. He belonged to the heraldic clan of Jastrzębiec, and adopted the surname Milanowski. In the second half of the 15th century, the parish was named after both Saint Nicolas and Saint Anne, who, according to the Christian tradition, was the mother of Mary of Nazareth, and maternal grandmother of Jesus Christ. By the end of the century, it also included the nearby settlements of Kępa Zawadowska, Okrzeszyn, Narty, Powsinek, and Zawady. In the 16th century, the church was replaced by a new Gothic wooden building, and a bell tower, after the previous burned down. In the 17th century Milanów was sold to nobleman and politician Bogusław Leszczyński. The settlement was also renamed to Wilanów, after a local residence known as Villa Nova, meaning "new village" in Latin. After the death of Leszczyński, Wilanów changed its ownership numerous times.

In 1677, John III Sobieski, the king of Poland and Grand Duke of Lithuania, decided to turn Wilanów into his residence. However, as per law, the ruling monarch was not allow to purchase land, he acquired it via his friend, politician Marek Matczyński. It was bought on On 23 April 1677, together with nearby Powsinek, from chamberlain Stanisław Krzycki. Between 1681 and 1696, the Wilanów Palace was constructed as a royal residence, in place of a former manor house. It was designed by Augustyn Wincenty Locci in the Baroque style, and featured a large garden complex, now known as the Wilanów Garden. During this time, the church was moved from the garden grounds to a new wooden building at the foregrounds of the palace. Following Sobieski's death, the estate were inherited by his sons, Aleksander Benedykt Sobieski and Konstanty Władysław Sobieski, and sold in 1720 to noblewoman and landowner Elżbieta Helena Sieniawska. The palace was expanded with west and east wings between 1723 and 1729, with a project designed by Giovanni Spazzio. In 1729, it was inherited by Maria Zofia Czartoryska, who leased it to king Augustus II the Strong. In 1782, the estate was inherited by Elżbieta Izabela Lubomirska, who added new structures to the palace yard, and expanded its collection of art. After her death in 1816, the ownership passed down to Stanisław Kostka Potocki. In 1892, the estate was inherited by Ksawery Branicki, and remained in the possession of his family until 1945, when the palace complex, and surrounding it landed estate were nationalised by the Polish government. Its last owner was Adam Branicki.

Between 1772 and 1775, the wooden church next to the palace was replaced by a new brick building, known as the St. Anne Church. It was designed by Jan Kotelnicki, and funded by August Aleksander Czartoryski, a nobleman, politician, military officer and owner of the estate. A cemetery was also developed next to the it.

In the 17th century, most likely in 1681, the Sadurka stream was redirected to the area of Wilanów, ending in the Wilanów Lake. Its path was designed by Augustyn Wincenty Locci, to feed the water network of the palace complex and surrounding it ponds. Currently, the Służewiec Stream flows in its place. In the late 17th- or the early 18th century, the Sobieski Canal was dug out, connecting the Wilanów Lake with Wilanówka river.

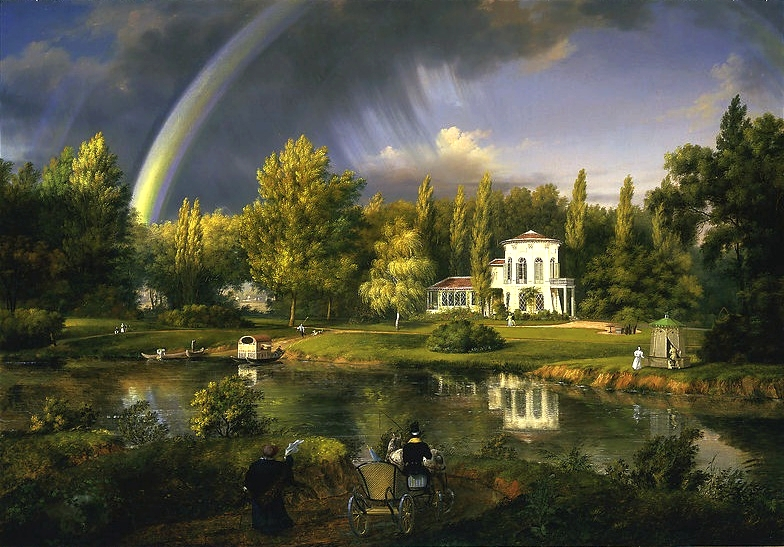
The 1834 oil painting by Wincenty Kasprzycki, depicting a neoclassical palace in Morysin.

At the beginning of the 19th century a park complex, known as Morysin, was developed in the northern half of the Island Woods, a small riparian forest, surrounded by the Wilanów Lake, Sobieski Canal, and Wilanówka River. It was founded by landowner Aleksandra Potocka, and named after her grandson, Maurycy Eustachy Potocki, known diminutively as Moryś. Previously, until the 18th century, the forest was used as the royal hunting grounds. The park complex included a neoclassical palace residence, designed by Chrystian Piotr Aigner, and built in 1811, which ruins survive to the present day. In 1846, a brick Gothic Revival gate and tower was built, at the end of a road leading from Morysin to the Wilanów Palace.

In 1805, Stanisław Kostka Potocki founded a museum, hosted in a portion of the Wilanów Palace, now known as the King John III Museum in Wilanów. It was dedicated to the collection of European and Middle Eastern art displayed at the palace, as well as the biography of king John III Sobieski, and the history of the Polish nation. It was the second public museum opened in Poland. In 1836, a Gothic Revival mausoleum was also built next to the palace, as a symbolic grave of Stanisław Kostka Potocki and Aleksandra Potocka. It was designed by Enrico Marconi.

In 1816, a new cemetery as founded to the northwest of the St. Anne Church, at the current intersection of Przyczółkowa Street and Wilanowska Avenue. A mausoleum chapel, designed by Chrystian Piotr Aigner, was built in its centre between 1823 and 1826. The cemetery was later expanded in around 1860, 1888, and at the turn of the 21st century. It was used as a burial ground for Polish soldiers fallen in the January Uprising between 1863 and 1864, the invasion of Poland in 1939, and the Warsaw Uprising in 1944.

In 1864, serfdom was abolished in Poland, including population of Wilanów. In 1867, Wilanów became seat of the eponymous municipality, which also included the surrounding settlements.

The St. Anne Church was rebuilt and expanded between 1857 and 1870 in the Renaissance Revival style. The new building was designed by Enrico Marconi, in cooperation with Leonard Marconi and Jan Huss, and commissioned by Aleksandra Potocka and August Potocki, the owners of the Wilanów Estate.

In 1892, the Warszawa Wilanów railway station (originally simply known as Wilanów), was opened at 31 Potockiego Street, as part of the Wilanów Railway, with narrow-gauge tracks. Originally using horse-drawn cars, it switched to steam locomotives in 1986. Both the station and the railway line were closed down in 1971. From 1979 to 2016, its former building was used as a post office.

In 1937, a tram line was built connecting Wilanów with Sadyba, crossing through Wiertnicza Street. On 15 May 1937, it became a part of a tram line, designated with the letter W, which connected the village with the city downtown.

In October 1941, while the area was under the German occupation during the Second World War, a labour camp was opened near Morysin, for the Soviet prisoners of war, captured during the Operation Barbarossa. It operated as a branch of the camp in Beniaminów. Upon its opening, it had around 450 inmates, of which, by the time of its liberation in December 1944, only around 60 survived.

On 15 May 1951, Wilanów, together with its eponymous municipality, was incorporated into the city of Warsaw.

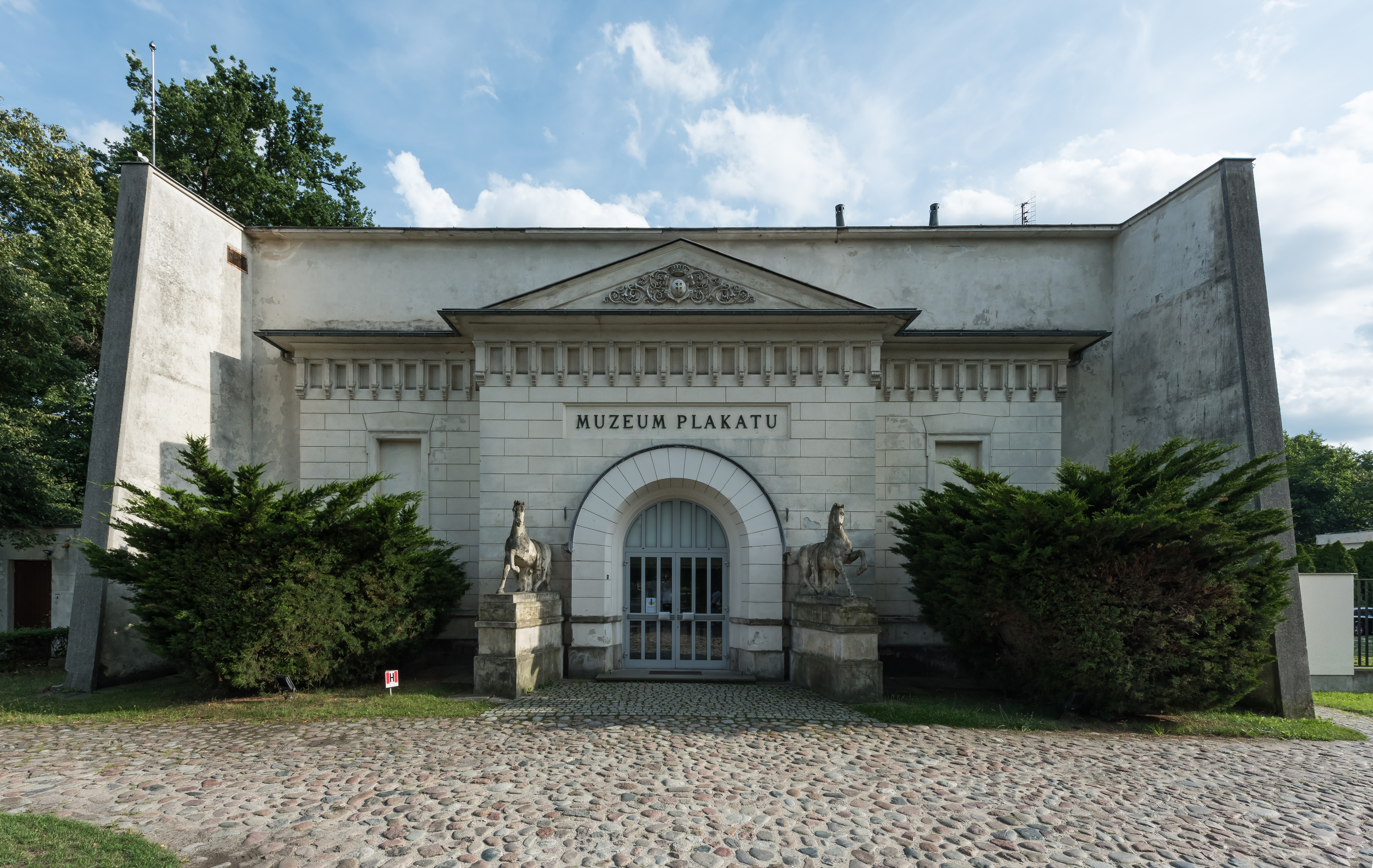
The Poster Museum, opened in 1968, as the first museum in the world dedicated to the history of poster design.

Following the nationalisation of the palace complex by the government, it was renovated between 1954 and 1962. Upon its completion, it was opened as the King John III Museum in Wilanów (until 2013 known as the Wilanów Palace Museum). It originally operated as a branch of the Warsaw National Museum, and became an independent institution in 1995. In 1968, the Poster Museum was opened at 10 and 16 Potockiego Street, as a branch of the Warsaw National Museum. It became the first museum in the world, dedicated to the history of the poster design. Its building incorporated the frontal façade of the former riding hall of the palace complex, originally designed by Francesco Maria Lanci, and built in 1848.

In 1973, the tram tracks on Wiertnicza Street were deconstructed, due to the development of the Vistula Way, a major arterial road of the city, on its north–south axis, which was opened in 1974, and incorporated the Przyczółkowa and Wiertnicza Streets as part of it.

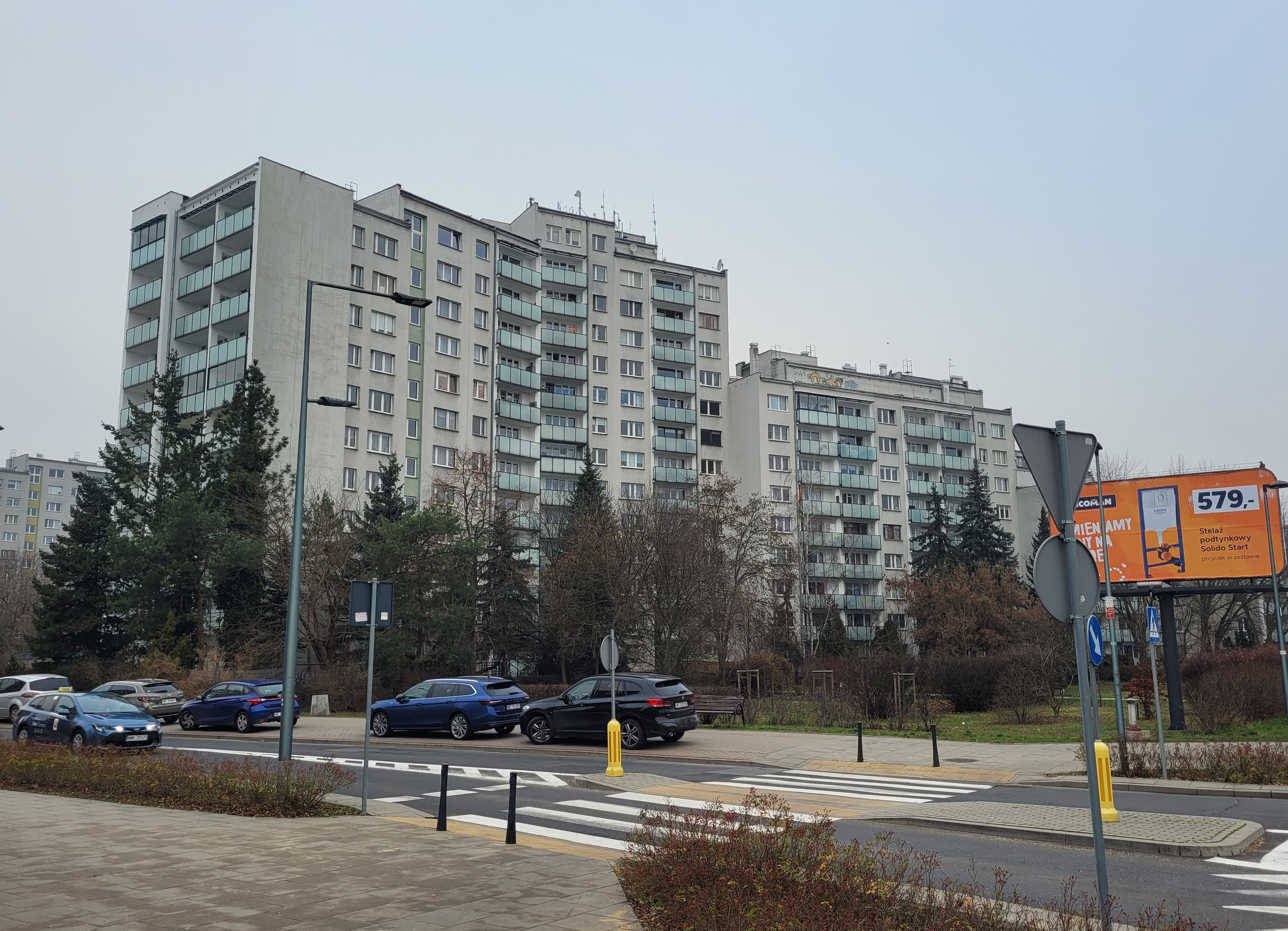
Apartment building in the housing estate of Wilanów II, built in the 1970s.

Between 1972 and 1975, the housing estate of Wilanów I was developed with several buildings, placed between Sobieskiego, Nałęczowska, Niemirowska, Resorowa, and Lentza Streets. Designed by T. Mrówczyński, it consisted of mid- and high-rise apartment buildings, constructed using the large panel system technique. It had a total of 730 apartments for around 2,200 residents, and covered an area of 5 ha. The area was expanded between 1976 and 1979, with another housing estate, known as Wilanów II, located between Królowej Marysieńki, Lentza, Resorowa, and Goplańska Streets. It was designed by J. Lipińska, it consisted of high-rise apartment buildings, also constructed with the large panel system technique, and covered an area of 20 ha.

In the 1980s, another housing estate, designated as Wilanów III, was built to the southeast, between Królowej Marysieński Street, Kosiarzy Street, Wilanowska Avenue, and Lentza Street, on an area of 11 ha. It was developed by the Council of Ministers Office, on an area which was expropriated for the construction of a hospital in 1975. It consisted of mid- and high-rise apartment buildings, constructed with the large panel system technique, and designed by W. Piziarski, J. Semeniuk, among others architects. Majority of its apartments were assigned to the politicians of the Polish United Workers' Party, including Aleksander Kwaśniewski, Leszek Miller, Józef Oleksy, Jerzy Szmajdziński, and Janusz Zemke, among others. The housing estate became colloquially known by the public as the Bay of Red Pigs (Polish: Zatoka czerwonych świń). In 2006, the National Public Prosecutor's Office, from the request by the Internal Security Agency, begun an investigation into the owners of the apartments in buildings at Wiktorii Wiedeńskiej and Marconich Streets, within the housing estate of Wilanów III. They were sold by the city to the residents between 1996 and 1998, with prices greatly lower than their contemporary market value. Among investigated were high-ranking members of the government, including former president Aleksander Kwaśniewski, and former prime ministers Leszek Miller and Józef Oleksy. In 2008, the investigation was dismissed, in 41 cases due to lack of evidence, and in 4, due to the expiration of the statute of limitation.

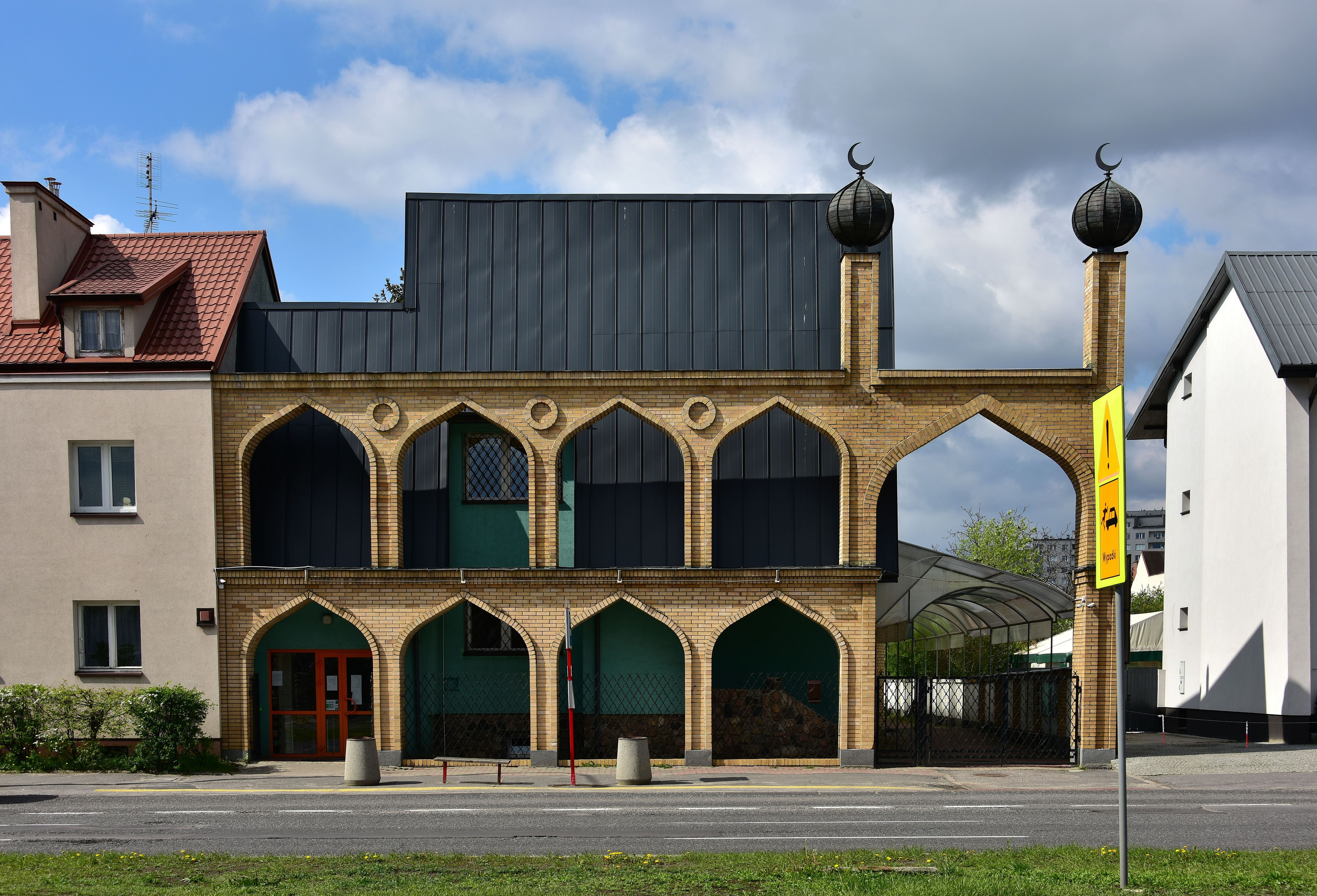
The Wilanów Mosque, opened in 1993.

In 1993, a villa house at 103 Wiertnicza Street was adopted into the Wilanów Mosque, becoming the first Islamic temple in the city. It belongs to the Sunni denomination.

In 1994, the Wilanów Palace and Morysin received the status of a historic monument of Poland. In 1996, Morysin was also granted the status of a nature reserve. In 2012, the Wilanów Palace and Morysin were included in the Wilanów Culture Park, a historic preservation area within the districts of Wilanów and Ursynów.

In 1998, the St. Anne Church was elevated to the status to the collegiate church, as the seat of the chapter of the deanery of Wilanów, known as the Divine Providence Chapter. In 2018, its seat was moved to the nearby Temple of Divine Providence in Wilanów Town.

In 2003, the Media Business Centre, an office building was opened at 166 Wiertnicza Street. It became headquarters, recording studio, and broadcasting station of the TVN Group television network. Previously, from 1996, it was headquartered in an office building on the other side of the roat, at 3 Augustówka Street.

On 26 September 2006, the Wilanów district was subdivided into eight City Information System areas, with the area of Old Wilanów, being divided between Wilanów Królewski, Wilanów Niski, and Wilanów Wysoki.

== Housing and infrastructure ==
The neighbourhood of Old Wilanów consists of low-rise single-family housing in its northeastern portion northcentral portion. Its western portion consist of three housing estates of apartment buildings, developed in the 1970s and the 1980s. This includes Wilanów III, colloquially known as the Bay of Red Pigs (Polish: Zatoka czerwonych świń), due to it being predominately inhabited by the politicians of the Polish United Workers' Party in the 1980s.

Przyczółkowa and Wiertnicza Streets, which cross through the neighbourhood, form a part of the Vistula Way, a major arterial road of the city, on its north–south axis.

== Culture and media ==
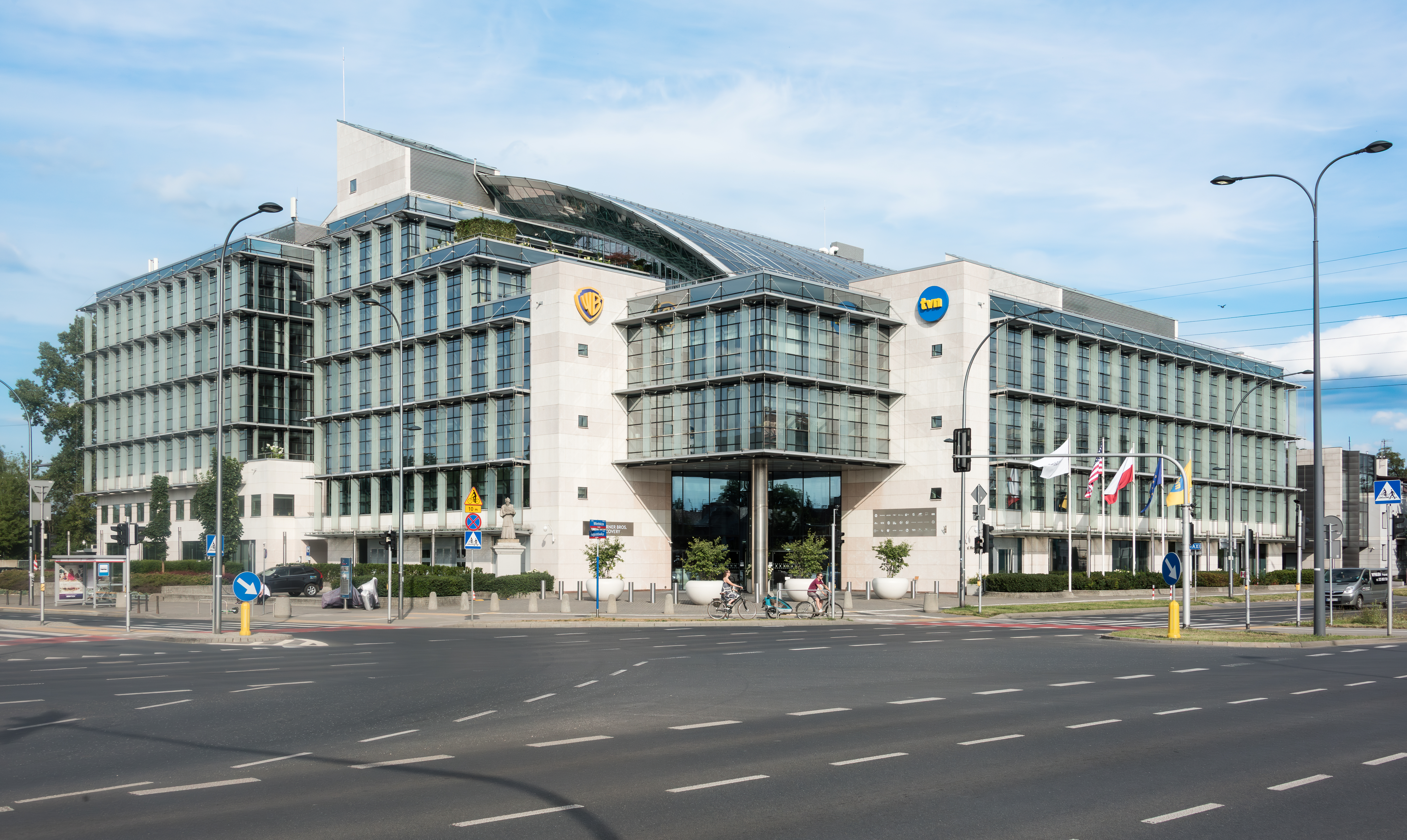
The Media Business Centre, the headquarters of the TVN Group television network.

The neighbourhood features the Wilanów Palace, located at 10 Potockiego Street. Built between 1681 and 1696, in the Baroque style, it served as a royal residence for John III Sobieski, the king of Poland and Grand Duke of Lithuania until 1696, and king Augustus II the Strong from 1679 to 1706. Currently, it houses the King John III Museum in Wilanów, dedicated to royal collection of European and Middle Eastern art, as well as biography of John III Sobieski. The palace complex also features large Italian garden, with an area of 24 ha, known as the Wilanów Garden. The palace surroundings also includes a Gothic Revival mausoleum from 1936, forming a symbolic grave of landowners and nobility Stanisław Kostka Potocki and Aleksandra Potocka, and the Poster Museum, a branch of the Warsaw National Museum. It was the first museum in the world dedicated to the history of the poster design, being opened in 1968. The area also includes a former building of the Warszawa Wilanów railway station, which operated as part of the Wilanów Railway from 1892 to 1971, and was later used as post office from 1979 to 2016.

The Wilanów Palace and the Morysin park complex have a status of a historic monument of Poland, and form part of the historic preservation area, known as the Wilanów Culture Park.

The neighbourhood also includes the Media Business Centre, an office building at 166 Wiertnicza Street, which forms the headquarters, recording studio, and broadcasting station of the TVN Group television network.

== Religion ==
The St. Anne Collegiate Church, which forms a seat of a Roman Catholic parish, is placed at 1 Kolegiacka Street, next to the Wilanów Palace. Its building was constructed in Renaissance Revival style and consecrated in 1870. The neighbourhood also includes the Wilanów Cemetery, a Roman Catholic burial ground, placed at the intersection of Przyczółkowa Street and Wilanowska Avenue. In its centre, it features a Gothic Revival mausoluem chapel, dating to 1824. The area also has the Wilanów Mosque, located at 103 Wiertnicza Street, which belongs to the Sunni Islam denomination. It is the one of two mosques in the city.

== Nature ==
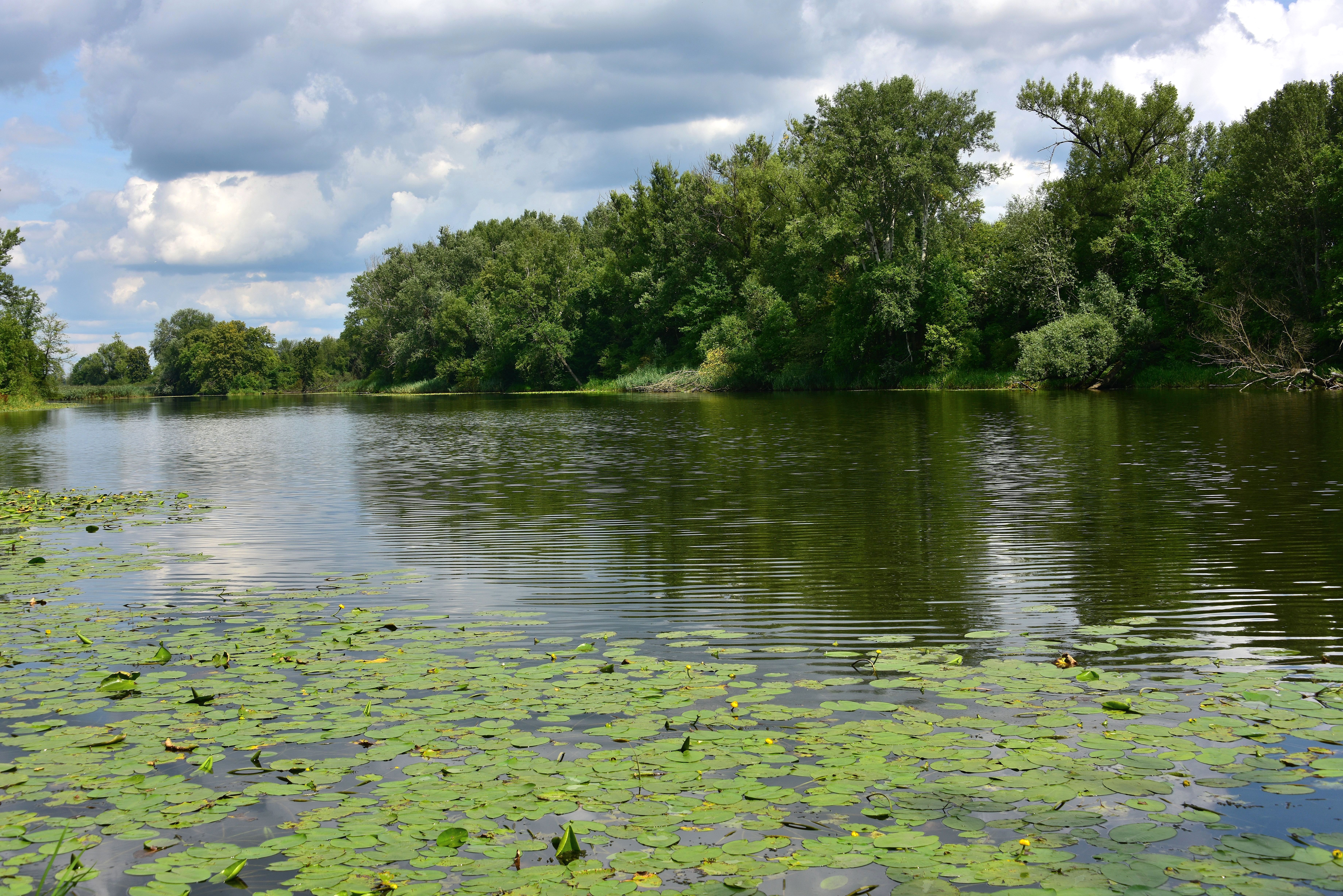
The Wilanów Lake.

To its east from the Wilanów, the neighbourhood features two small ponds, the Wilanów Lake and the Southern Pond, with areas of around 13.47 and 0.57 ha respectively. To their east, the area consists of farmland in the south, and the Morysin landscape park and nature reserve in the north, with an area of 53.46 ha. It is mostly covered by a riparian forest with presence of numerous species of fauna and flora. It also features several historical structures, including the Gothic Revival gate and tower from 1846, and ruins of a neoclassical palace from 1811. To its east, Morysin borders the Wilanówka river, while to the north, by the Sobieski Canal, which connects the later with the Wilanów Lake. Additionally, the lake forms an outflow destination of the Służewiec Stream, which crosses the area from the west. The neighbourhood also features the Sielanka lake, with an area of 0.89 ha, and the W Canal, outflowing from it to the Czerniaków Lake in the Mokotów district.
