= Wilanów Niski =

Neighbourhood of Warsaw, Poland

- City Information System area (neighbourhood)
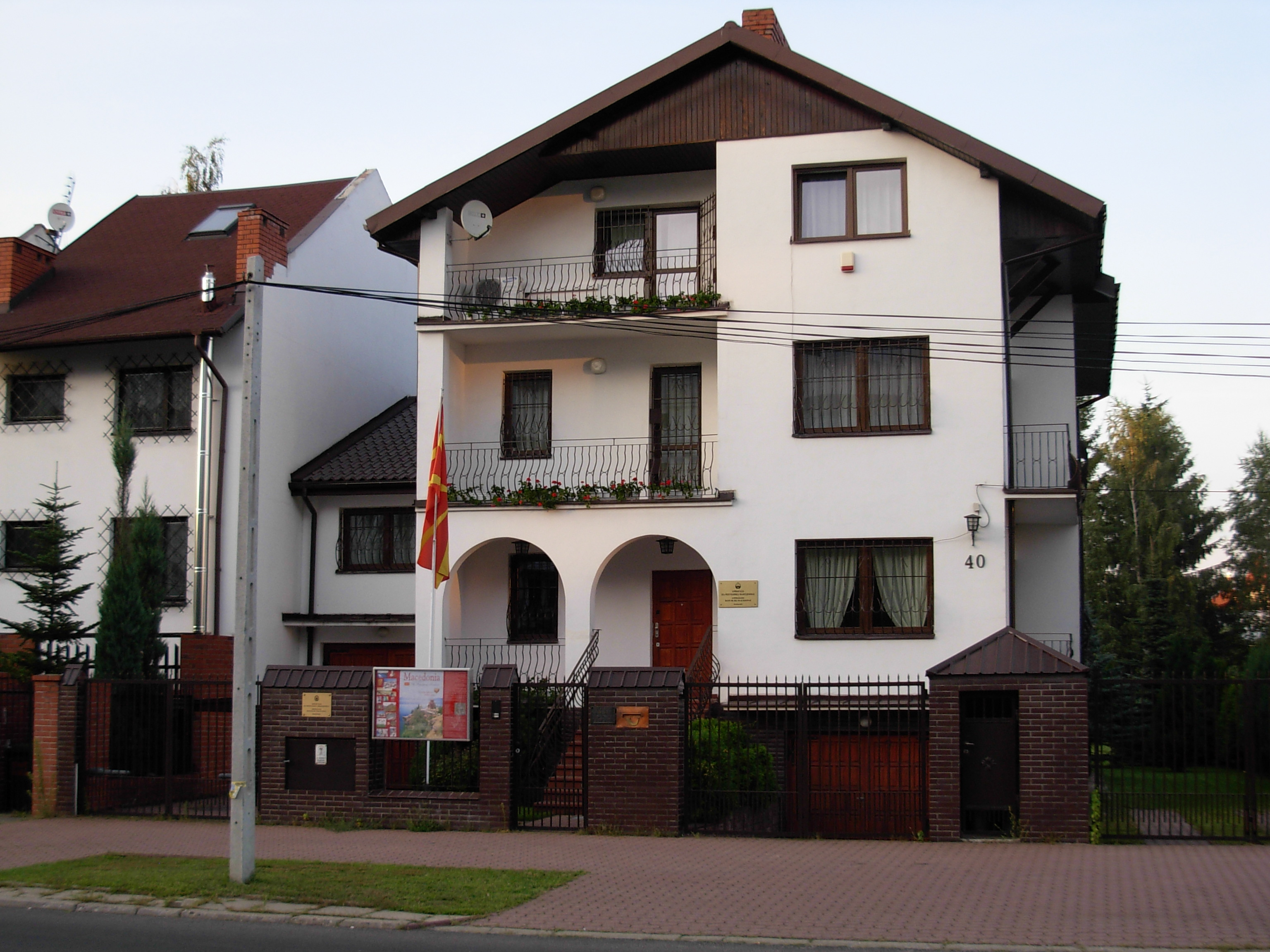
- A house on Królowej Marysieńki Street in Wilanów Niski.

- Map of the subdivisions of Wilanów, including Wilanów Niski.
- Coordinates: 52°10′34″N 21°04′40″E
- Country: Poland
- Voivodeship: Masovian
- City and county: Warsaw
- District: Wilanów
- Time zone: UTC+1 (CET)
  - Summer (DST): UTC+2 (CEST)
- Area code: +48 22

Wilanów Niski (Polish: [viˈla.nuf ˈɲis.ki]; lit. 'Low-rise Wilanów') is a neighbourhood, and a City Information System area, in Warsaw, Poland, within the Wilanów district. It is a low-rise single family residential area. The neighbourhood also includes the Wilanów Mosque, which belongs to the Sunni Islam denomination, and is one of two mosques in the city, and the Media Business Centre, an office building, which forms the headquarters, recording studio, and broadcasting station of the TVN Group television network. Together with the areas of Wilanów Królewski and Wilanów Wysoki, Wilanów Niski forms the neighbourhood of Old Wilanów.

Relicts of a human settlement were discovered in the area, dating to the between 150 and 50 BCE. The oldest records of Wilanów, known until the 16th century as Milanów, date to the 13th century. In 1338, the settlement became a property of duke Trojeden I, the ruler of the Duchy of Czersk, and was later given to knight Stanisław of Strzelczyków in the second half of the century. In 1677, the village was acquired by John III Sobieski, the king of Poland and Grand Duke of Lithuania, who, between 1681 and 1696, built nearby his residence, in the form of the Wilanów Palace, designed by Augustyn Wincenty Locci in the Baroque style. The estate was later owned by Czartoryski, Lubomirski, Potocki, and Branicki families. In 1867, Wilanów became the seat of the eponymous municipality, which also included the surrounding settlements. It was incorporated into Warsaw in 1951.

== Toponomy ==
The name Wilanów Niski translates directly from Polish as Low-rise Wilanów, referring it being a low-rise single-family residential area, in contrast to the nearby Wilanów Wysoki (lit. 'High-rise Wilanów') being a high-rise residential area. The name Wilanów itself was coined in the 16th century, as a Polonised borrowing of a Latin name Villa Nova, meaning "new village", which was used to refer to one of the residences in the area. Previously, the settlement was known as Milanów and Milanowo, with records of the name dating to the 13th century.

== History ==
The oldest archeological evidence of human settlements in the area date to between 150 and 50 BCE. The oldest known records of the village of Milanów (also known as Milanowo), located in the northern portion of the modern Wilanów district, date back to the 13th century. At the time, the settlement was owned by the Benedictine abbey in Płock, which founded there the Roman Catholic Parish of Saint Nicholas. In the 14th century, it founded a constitution of a wooden temple, named the St. Leonard Church. In 1338, the village became the property of duke Trojden I, the ruler of the Duchy of Czersk. In the second half of the 14th century, the village was given to knight Stanisław of Strzelczyków, for his service to the duke. He belonged to the heraldic clan of Jastrzębiec, and adopted the surname Milanowski. In the second half of the 15th century, the parish was named after both Saint Nicolas and Saint Anne, who, according to the Christian tradition, was the mother of Mary of Nazareth, and maternal grandmother of Jesus Christ. By the end of the century, it also included the nearby settlements of Kępa Zawadowska, Okrzeszyn, Narty, Powsinek, and Zawady. In the 16th century, the church was replaced by a new Gothic wooden building, and a bell tower, after the previous burned down. In the 17th century Milanów was sold to nobleman and politician Bogusław Leszczyński. The settlement was also renamed to Wilanów, after a local residence known as Villa Nova, meaning "new village" in Latin. After the death of Leszczyński, Wilanów changed its ownership numerous times.

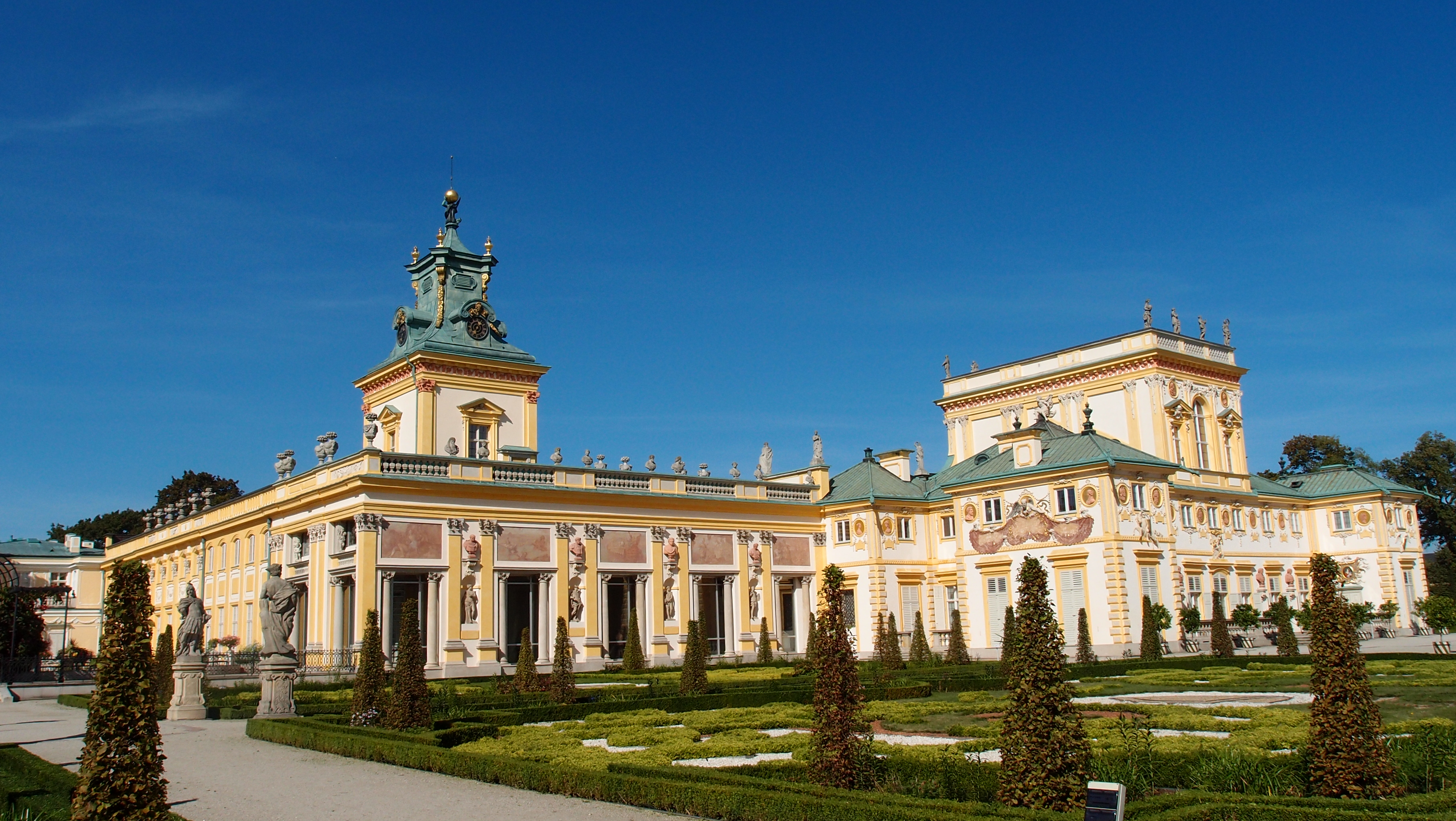
The Wilanów Palace built for king John III Sobieski in 1696. Currently located within the neighbourhood of Wilanów Królewski.

In 1677, John III Sobieski, the king of Poland and Grand Duke of Lithuania, decided to turn Wilanów into his residence. However, as per law, the ruling monarch was not allow to purchase land, he acquired it via his friend, politician Marek Matczyński. Between 1681 and 1696, the Wilanów Palace was constructed as a royal residence, in place of a former manor house. It was designed by Augustyn Wincenty Locci in the Baroque style, and featured a large garden complex, now known as the Wilanów Garden. During this time, the church was moved from the garden grounds to a new wooden building at the foregrounds of the palace. Following Sobieski's death, the estate were inherited by his sons, Aleksander Benedykt Sobieski and Konstanty Władysław Sobieski, and sold in 1720 to noblewoman and landowner Elżbieta Helena Sieniawska. The palace was expanded with west and east wings between 1723 and 1729, with a project designed by Giovanni Spazzio. In 1729, it was inherited by Maria Zofia Czartoryska, who leased it to king Augustus II the Strong. In 1782, the estate was inherited by Elżbieta Izabela Lubomirska, who added new structures to the palace yard, and expanded its collection of art. After her death in 1816, the ownership passed down to Stanisław Kostka Potocki. In 1892, the estate was inherited by Ksawery Branicki, and remained in the possession of his family until 1945, when the palace complex, and surrounding it landed estate were nationalised by the Polish government. Its last owner was Adam Branicki.

Between 1772 and 1775, the wooden church next to the palace was replaced by a new brick building, known as the St. Anne Church. It was designed by Jan Kotelnicki, and funded by August Aleksander Czartoryski, a nobleman, politician, military officer and owner of the estate. A cemetery was also developed next to the it.

In 1805, Stanisław Kostka Potocki founded a museum, hosted in a portion of the Wilanów Palace, now known as the King John III Museum in Wilanów. It was dedicated to the collection of European and Middle Eastern art displayed at the palace, as well as the biography of king John III Sobieski, and the history of the Polish nation. It was the second public museum opened in Poland. In 1836, a Gothic Revival mausoleum was also built next to the palace, as a symbolic grave of Stanisław Kostka Potocki and Aleksandra Potocka. It was designed by Enrico Marconi.

In 1816, a new cemetery was founded to the northwest of the St. Anne Church, at the current intersection of Przyczółkowa Street and Wilanowska Avenue. A mausoleum chapel, designed by Chrystian Piotr Aigner, was built in its centre between 1823 and 1826. The cemetery was later expanded in around 1860, 1888, and at the turn of the 21st century. It was used as a burial ground for Polish soldiers fallen in the January Uprising between 1863 and 1864, the invasion of Poland in 1939, and the Warsaw Uprising in 1944.

In 1864, serfdom was abolished in Poland, including population of Wilanów. In 1867, Wilanów became seat of the eponymous municipality, which also included the surrounding settlements.

The St. Anne Church was rebuilt and expanded between 1857 and 1870 in the Renaissance Revival style. The new building was designed by Enrico Marconi, in cooperation with Leonard Marconi and Jan Huss, and commissioned by Aleksandra Potocka and August Potocki, the owners of the Wilanów Estate.

In 1892, the Warszawa Wilanów railway station (originally simply known as Wilanów), was opened at 31 Potockiego Street, as part of the Wilanów Railway, with narrow-gauge tracks. Originally using horse-drawn cars, it switched to steam locomotives in 1986. Both the station and the railway line were closed down in 1971. From 1979 to 2016, its former building was used as a post office.

In 1937, a tram line was built connecting Wilanów with Sadyba, crossing through Wiertnicza Street. On 15 May 1937, it became a part of a tram line, designated with the letter W, which connected the village with the city downtown.

On 15 May 1951, Wilanów, together with its eponymous municipality, was incorporated into the city of Warsaw.

Following the nationalisation of the palace complex by the government, it was renovated between 1954 and 1962. Upon its completion, it was opened as the King John III Museum in Wilanów (until 2013 known as the Wilanów Palace Museum). It originally operated as a branch of the Warsaw National Museum, and became an independent institution in 1995.

In 1973, the tram tracks on Wiertnicza Street were deconstructed, due to the development of the Vistula Way, a major arterial road of the city, on its north–south axis, which was opened in 1974, and incorporated the Przyczółkowa and Wiertnicza Streets as part of it.

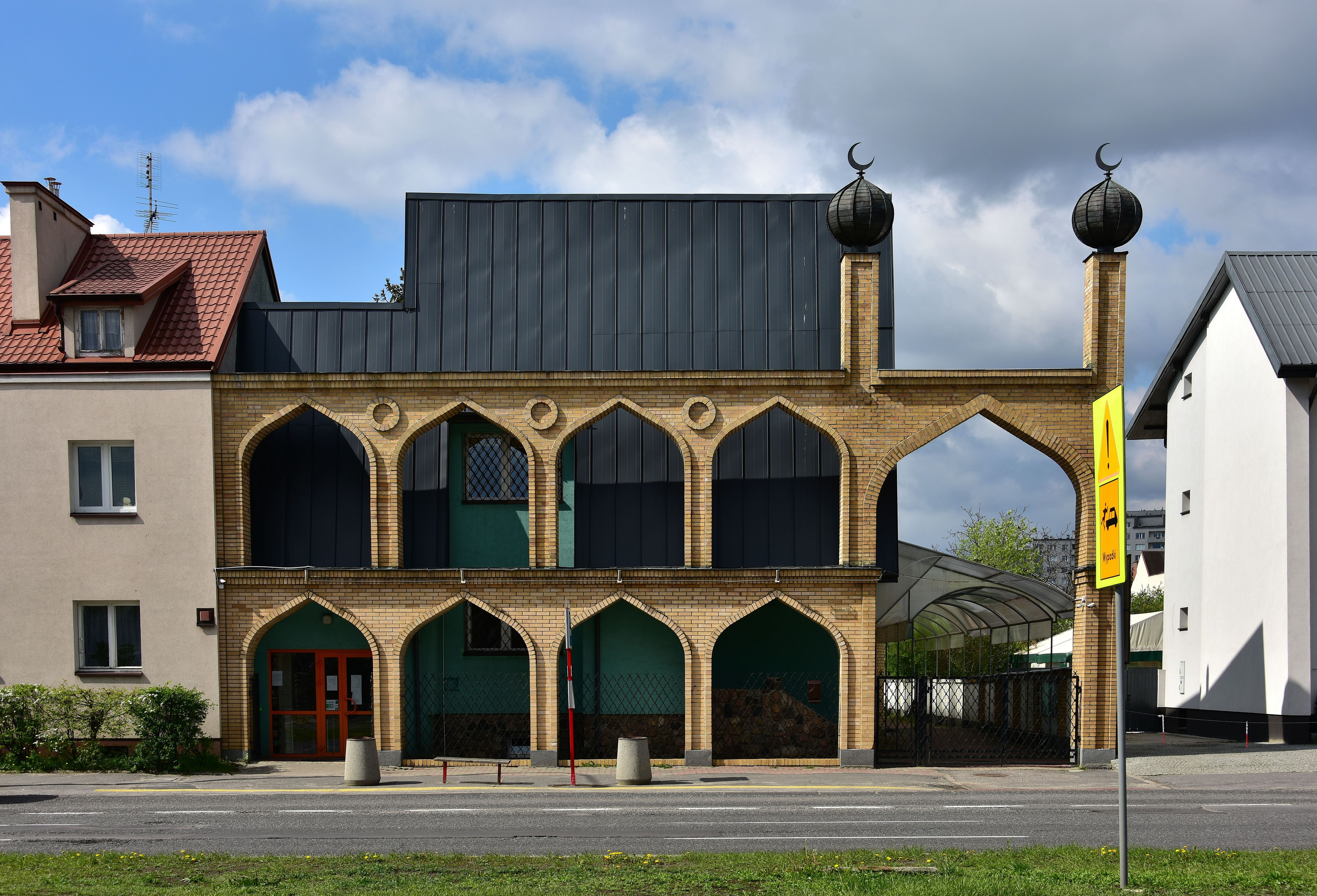
The Wilanów Mosque, opened in 1993.

In 1993, a villa house at 103 Wiertnicza Street was adopted into the Wilanów Mosque, becoming the first Islamic temple in the city. It belongs to the Sunni denomination.

In 2003, the Media Business Centre, an office building was opened at 166 Wiertnicza Street. It became headquarters, recording studio, and broadcasting station of the TVN Group television network. Previously, from 1996, it was headquartered in an office building on the other side of the roat, at 3 Augustówka Street.

On 26 September 2006, the Wilanów district was subdivided into eight City Information System areas, with the neighbourhood of Old Wilanów, being divided between Wilanów Królewski, Wilanów Niski, and Wilanów Wysoki. Majority of the historical structures, including the Wilanów Palace, St. Anne Collegiate Church, and Wilanów Cemetery, became part of Wilanów Królewski, while Wilanów Niski incorporated majority of the low-rise single family housing area.

== Characteristics ==
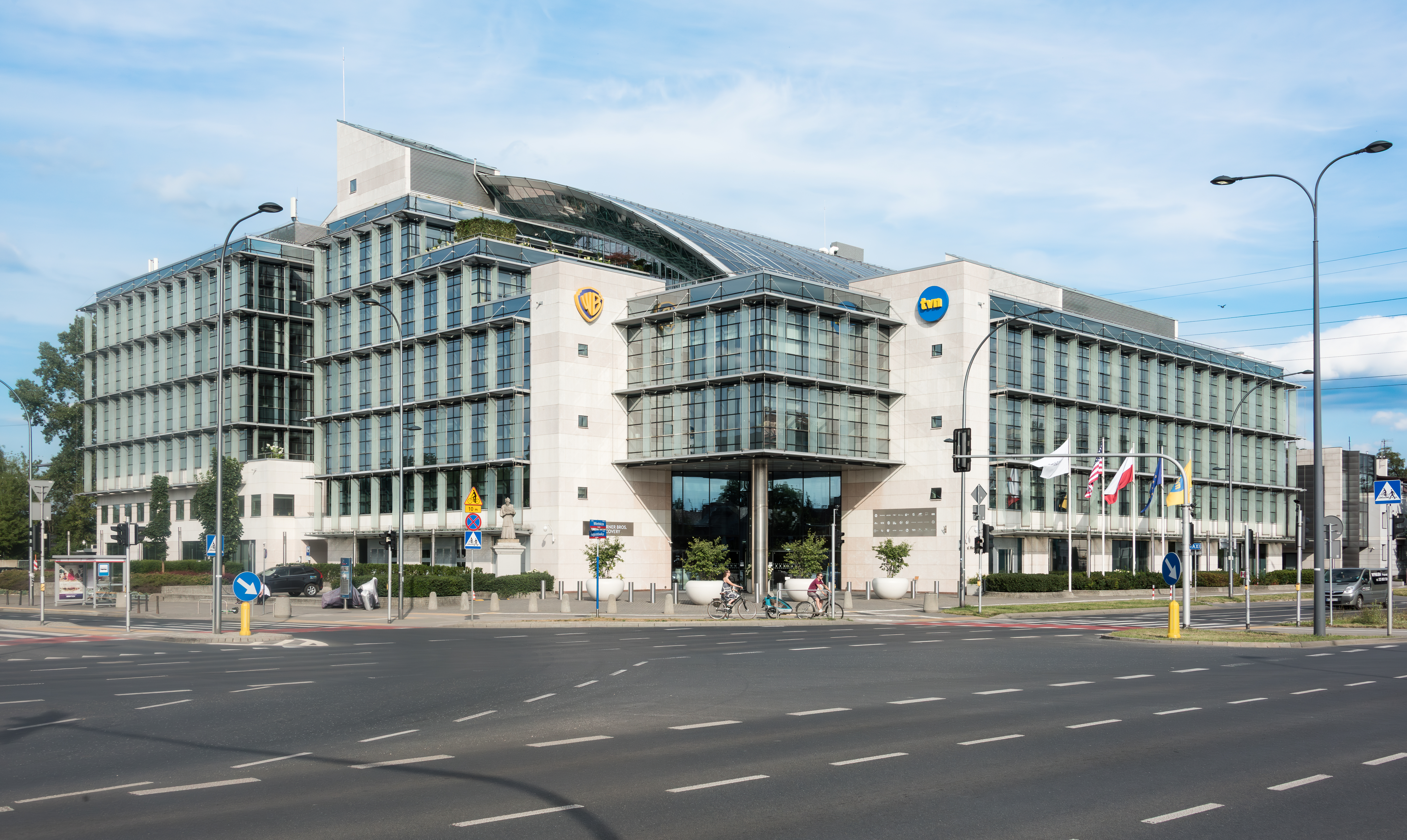
The Media Business Centre, the headquarters of the TVN Group television network.

The western half of the neighbourhood forms a low-rise single-family housing area, while its eastern half is predominantly covered by fields and allotment gardens. The neighbourhood includes the Wilanów Mosque, located at 103 Wiertnicza Street, which belongs to the Sunni Islam denomination. It is the one of two mosques in the city. It also has the Media Business Centre, an office building at 166 Wiertnicza Street, which forms the headquarters, recording studio, and broadcasting station of the TVN Group television network.

The neighbourhood also features the Sielanka lake, with an area of 0.89 ha, and the W Canal, outflowing from it to the Czerniaków Lake in the Mokotów district.

Wiertnicza Street, which crosses through the neighbourhood, forms part of the Vistula Way, a major arterial road of the city on its north–south axis.

== Location and boundaries ==
Wilanów Niski is a City Information System area in Warsaw, located in the central north portion of the Wilanów district. Its boundaries are approximately determined to the northwest by Goplańska Street, Wiertnicza Street, Augustówka Street; to the northeast by Zawodzie Street, Łucznicza Street, and around the allotment gardens; to the east by the Wilanówka river, Trójpolowa Street, Łucznicza Street, and Biedronki Street; to the southeast by Obornicka Street, Królowej Marysieńki Street; and to the southwest by Królowej Marysieńki Street. The neighbourhood borders Augustówka, and Sadyba to the north, Zawady to the east, Powsinek to the south, and Wilanów Wysoki to the east.
