= Ksawery Branicki =

Ksawery Branicki or Xavier Branicki may refer to:

- Xavier Branicki (1816–1879) or Franciszek Ksawery Branicki, Polish nobleman
- Ksawery Branicki (1864–1926), Polish nobleman and naturalist
- Franciszek Ksawery Branicki (1730–1819), Polish nobleman
