= Wilanów Mosque =

Mosque in Warsaw, Poland

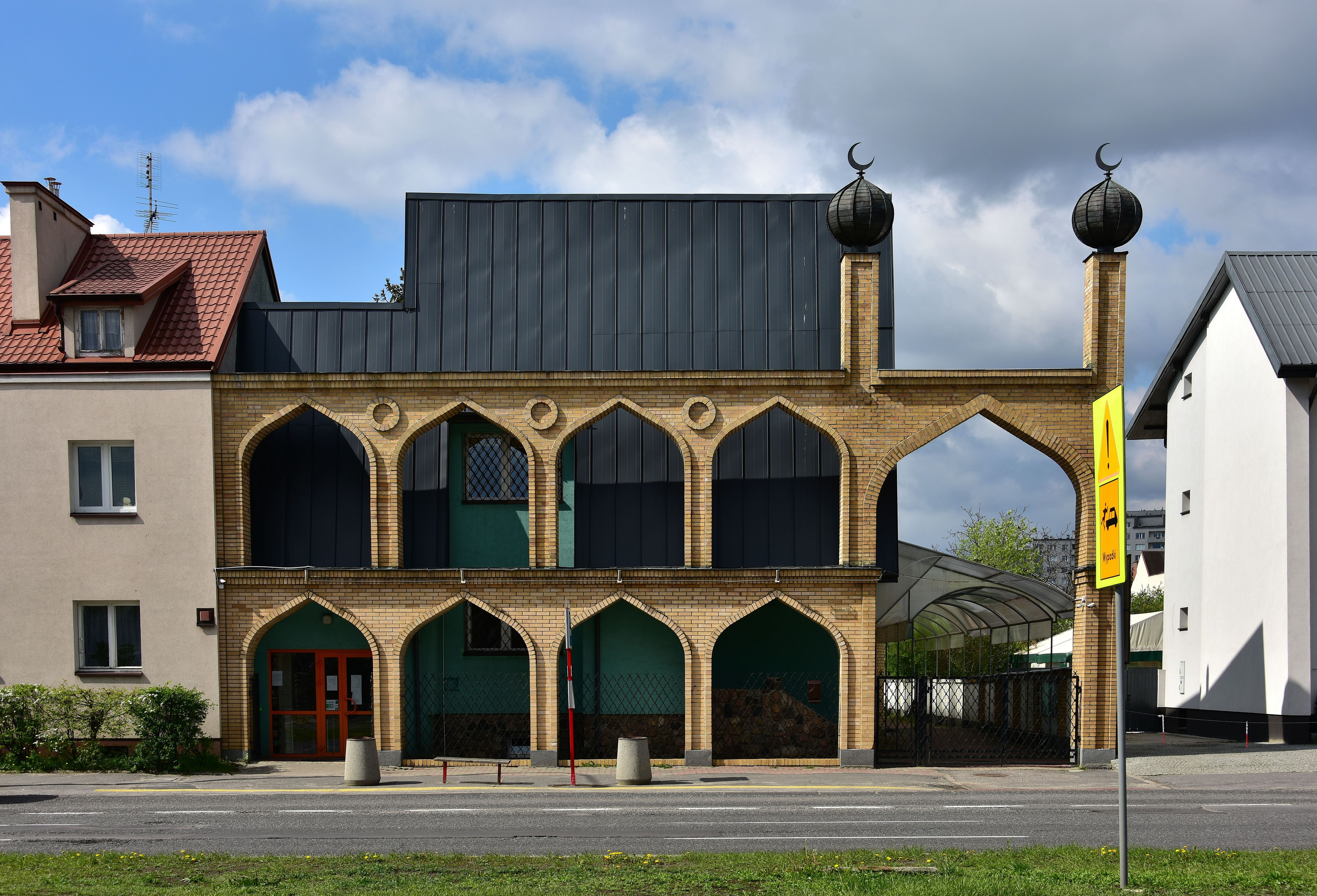
- The mosque in 2017.

Religion
- Affiliation: Sunni Islam
- Ecclesiastical or organizational status: Mosque
- Status: Active

Location
- Location: 103 Wiertnicza Street, Wilanów, Warsaw, Poland
- Interactive map of Wilanów Mosque
- Coordinates: 52°10′27.81″N 21°04′41.19″E

Architecture
- Type: Mosque
- Completed: 1993

The Wilanów Mosque (Polish: Meczet w Wilanowie) is a Sunni Islamic mosque in Warsaw, Poland, located within the Wilanów district. It is placed at 103 Wiertnicza Street, in the neighbourhood of Wilanów Niski. It is operated by the Islamic Cultural Centre, and is part of the Muslim Religious Association. The building was opened in 1993.

== History ==
In 1935, the interwar period, the community of Lipka Tatars proposed the construction of a mosque at the Siberian Exiles Roundabout in Warsaw. According to their requirements, it should have had a minaretdome, a water fountain at the entrance, and a main prayer hall for 350 men, and a secondary hall for 100 women. In 1936, the project by architect Stanisław Kolendo and Tadeusz Miazek was chosen, which envisioned a building with an onion dome and 20 minarets surrounding it. It was however, never built.

Between 1992 and 1993, a villa house at 103 Wiertnicza Street was adopted into a Sunni Islamic mosque, becoming the first Muslim temple in the city. The project had financial backing from Saudi Arabia. Among its attendees are members of the communities of Lipka Tatars, Chechens, and other Muslim immigrant groups in the city. It is operated by the Islamic Cultural Centre, and is part of the Muslim Religious Association.

== Gallery ==
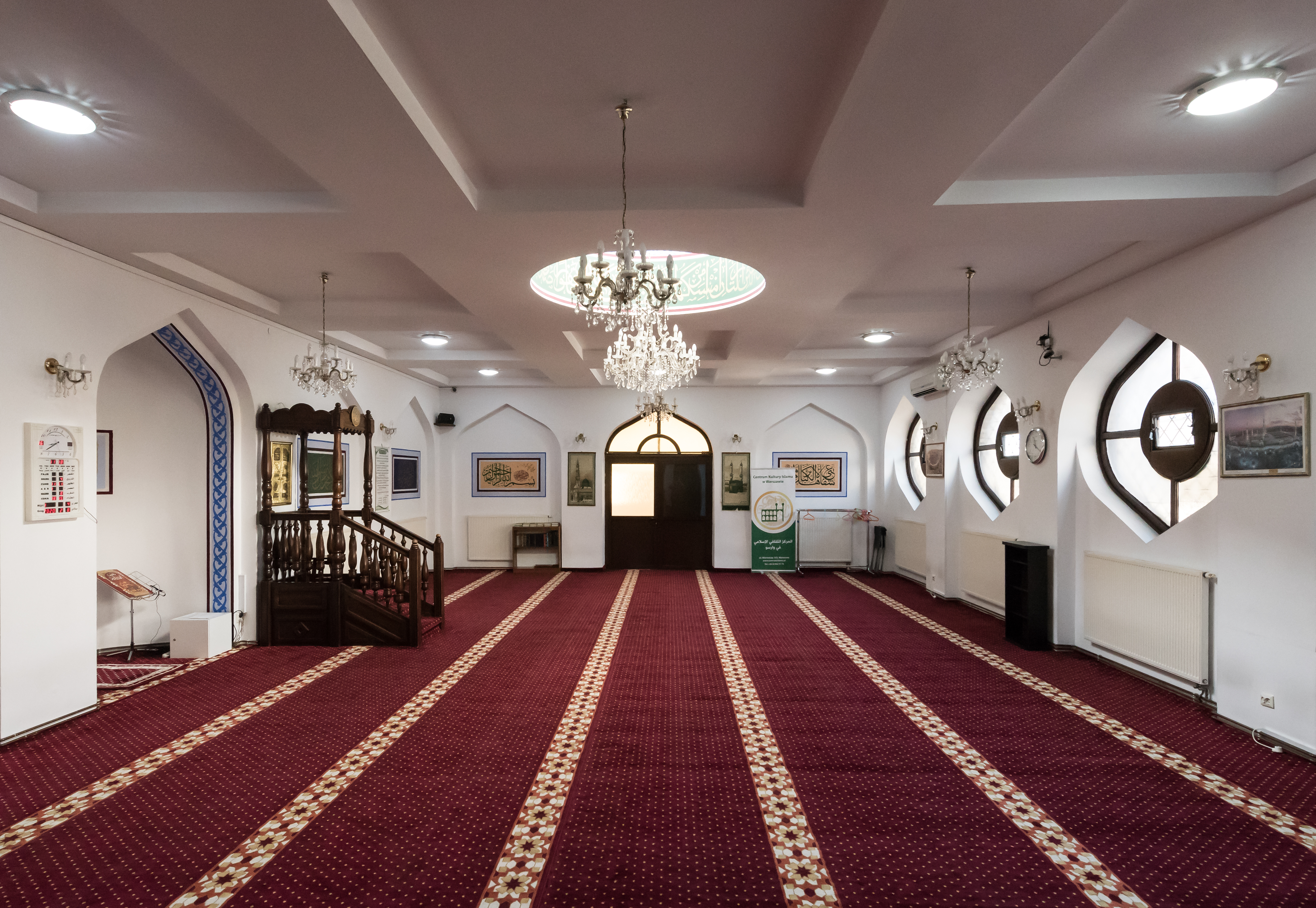
The praying hall inside the Warsaw Mosque.
