= Powsinek =

Neighbourhood of Warsaw, Poland

- City Information System area (neighbourhood)
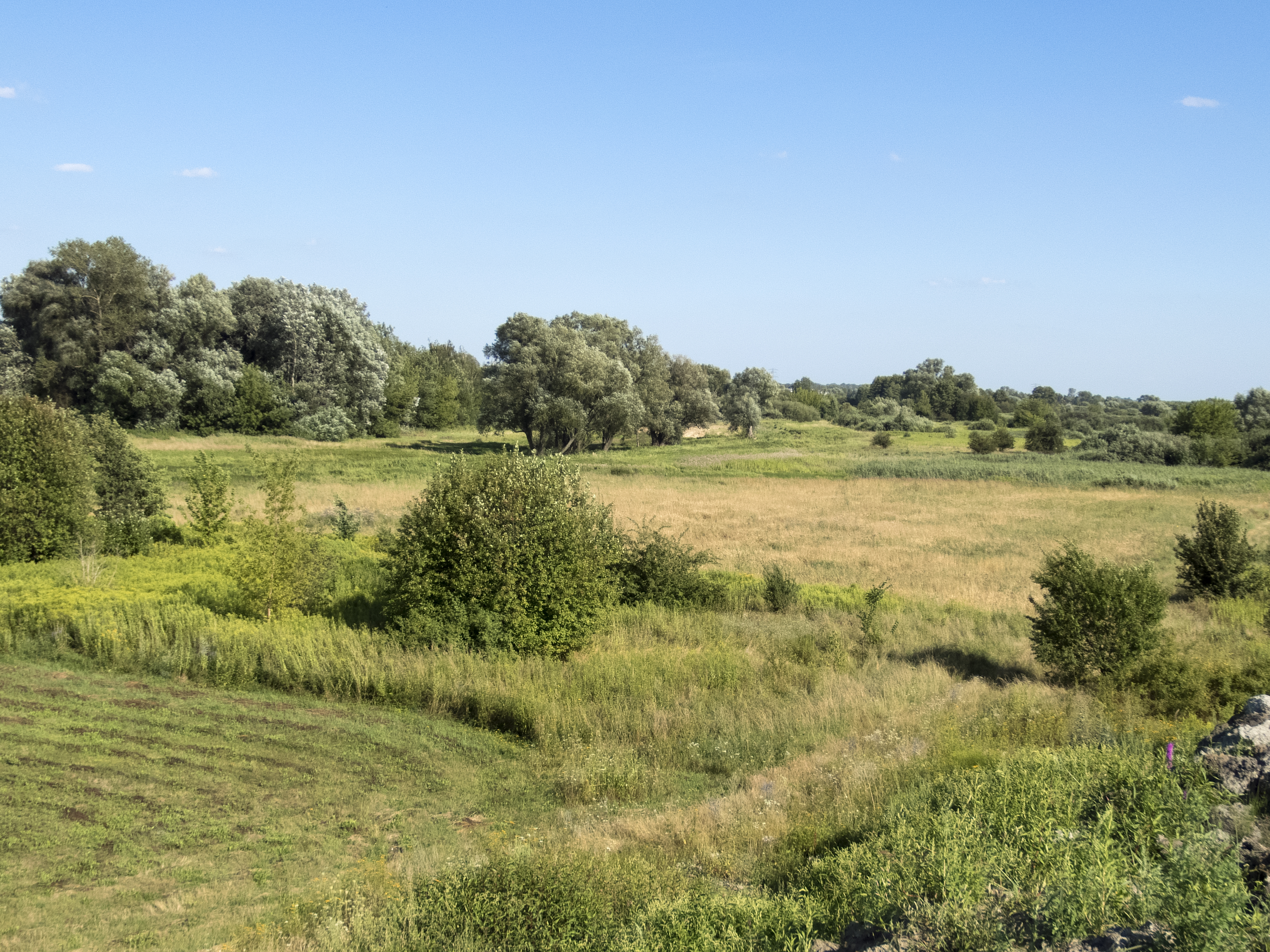
- Łąki Kośne, a grass field in Powsinek.

- Map of the subdivisions of Wilanów, including Powsinek.
- Coordinates: 52°09′27″N 21°05′26″E
- Country: Poland
- Voivodeship: Masovian
- City and county: Warsaw
- District: Wilanów
- Time zone: UTC+1 (CET)
  - Summer (DST): UTC+2 (CEST)
- Area code: +48 22

Powsinek (Polish: [pɔfˈɕi.nɛk]) is a neighbourhood, and a City Information System area, in Warsaw, Poland, within the Wilanów district. The neighbourhood features a residential area with low-rise single-family housing, as well as green areas, including a large grass field and farmlands. It also has the Powsinek Lake, and is crossed through the Wilanówka river, and two water ditches, Natolin and Powsinek.

The oldest known records of Powsinek date to 1422. In the 15th century, it was owned by the clan of Prus. In 1677, the village was acquired together with nearby Milanów (now Wilanów) by John III Sobieski, the king of Poland and Grand Duke of Lithuania. The estate was later owned by Czartoryski, Lubomirski, Potocki, and Branicki families. In 1951, Powsinek was incorporated into the city of Warsaw.

== Toponomy ==
The name Powsinek is a diminutive form of the name of Powsin, a nearby neighbourhood, and formerly a village. It was first recorded in 1422, as Powsino Minor. It was later also recorded as Powsino Prutenorum (1426), Powszino Minor (1433), Powszino Pruske (1457), Powsino Taborowe (1493), Maly Powsyn (1494), Powsinek (1510), Powszynko (1514), and Powszynek (1526).

== History ==
The oldest known records of Powsinek date to 1422. Powsinek was founded as an extension of the nearby villages of Powsin and Milanów. In the 15th century, Powsinek was owned by the clan of Prus. In 1528, together with the farmland, the settlement had an area of 10 lans, being an equivalent to around 170 ha. In 1661, it had 22 households. On 23 April 1677, Powsinek and Milanów were sold by chamberlain Stanisław Krzycki to politician Marek Matczyński, for John III Sobieski, the king of Poland and Grand Duke of Lithuania, for the price of 35,000 florins. Following Sobieski's death, the estate were inherited by his sons, Aleksander Benedykt Sobieski and Konstanty Władysław Sobieski, and sold in 1720 to noblewoman and landowner Elżbieta Helena Sieniawska. In 1729, it was inherited by Maria Zofia Czartoryska, and in 1782, by Elżbieta Izabela Lubomirska. After her death, the ownership passed down to Stanisław Kostka Potocki. In 1892, the estate was inherited by Ksawery Branicki, and remained in the possession of his family until 1945, the estate were nationalised by the Polish government. Its last owner was Adam Branicki.

In 1775, Powsinek had 38 households, and, together with its farmlands, it had an area of 328 ha. In 1867, following the administrative reform, it became part of the municipality of Wilanów. In 1886, Powsinek had 349 inhabitants, and its farmland was divided into 575 new Polish morgen owned by the peasants, and 45 new Polish morgen owned by the nobility. They were equal to around 321.93 ha and 25.19 ha, respectively. In 1905, the village had 606 residents in 57 households, and in 1921, it had 900 residents in 110 households.

On 15 May 1951, Powsinek, together with the rest of the municipality of Wilanów, was incorporated into the city of Warsaw.

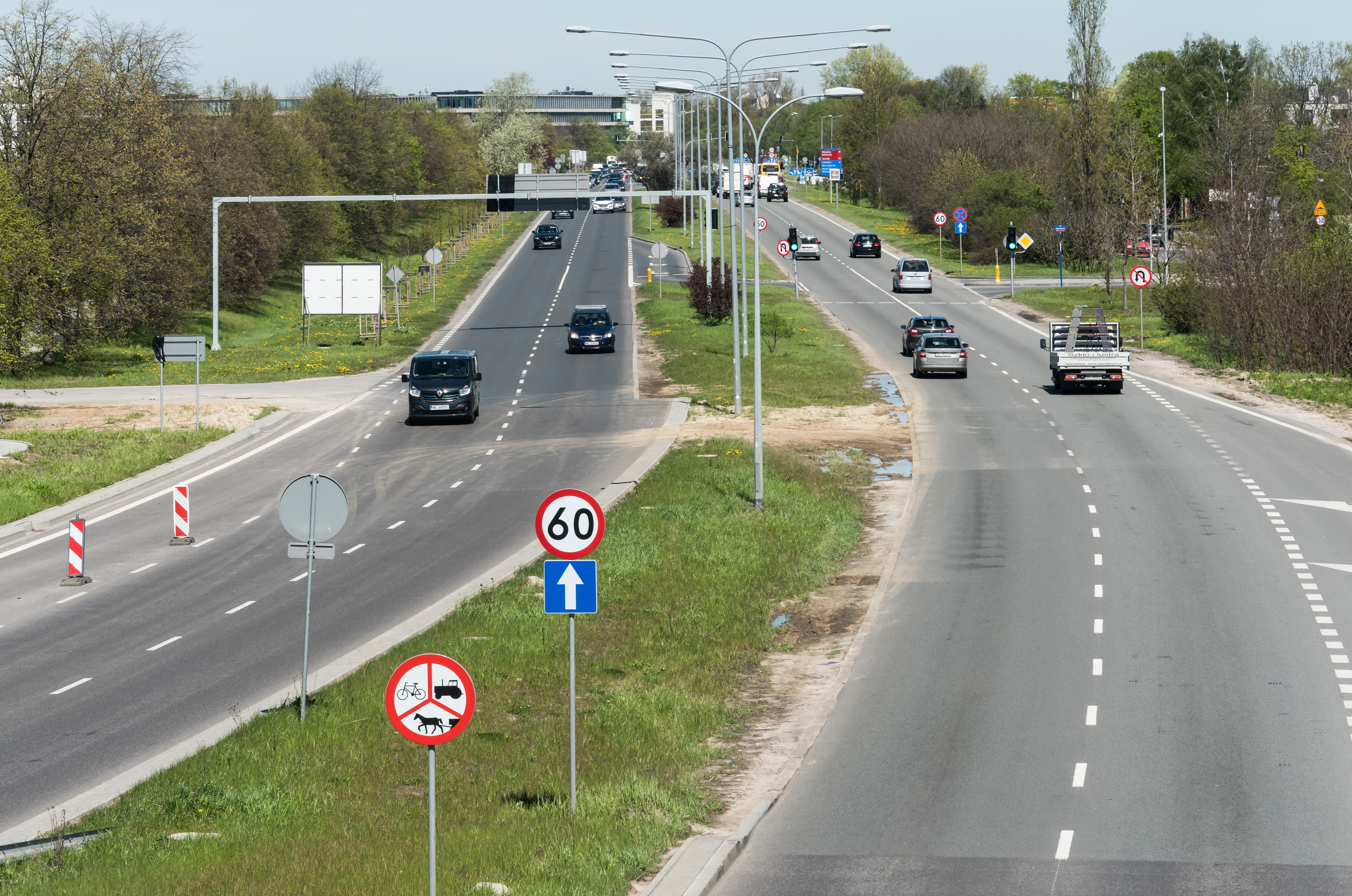
Przyczółkowa Street, which, since 1974, forms a part of the Vistula Way, a major arterial road of Warsaw.

In 1974, Przyczółkowa Street, which marks the western boundary of the neighbourhood, became a part of the Vistula Way, a major arterial road of the city, on its north–south axis.

On 26 September 2006, the Wilanów district was subdivided into eight City Information System areas, with Powsinek becoming one of them.

Between 2017 and 2021, the Expressway S2, which forms a part of the municipal ring roads, was built, crossing Powsinek on the west–east axis. It included the construction of a interchange with the Vistula Way on Przyczółkowa Street.

== Housing and infrastructure ==
The northwestern portion of the neighbourhood features a low-rise single-family housing area, based around the intersection of Przyczółkowa and Vogla Streets. It also includes houses alongside Ruczaj Street. Przyczółkowa Street forms a part of the Vistula Way, a major arterial road of the city, on its north–south axis. The negihourhood is also crossed on the west–east axis by the Expressway S2, which forms a part of the municipal ring roads. It includes an interchange the Vistula Way on Przyczółkowa Street.

== Nature ==
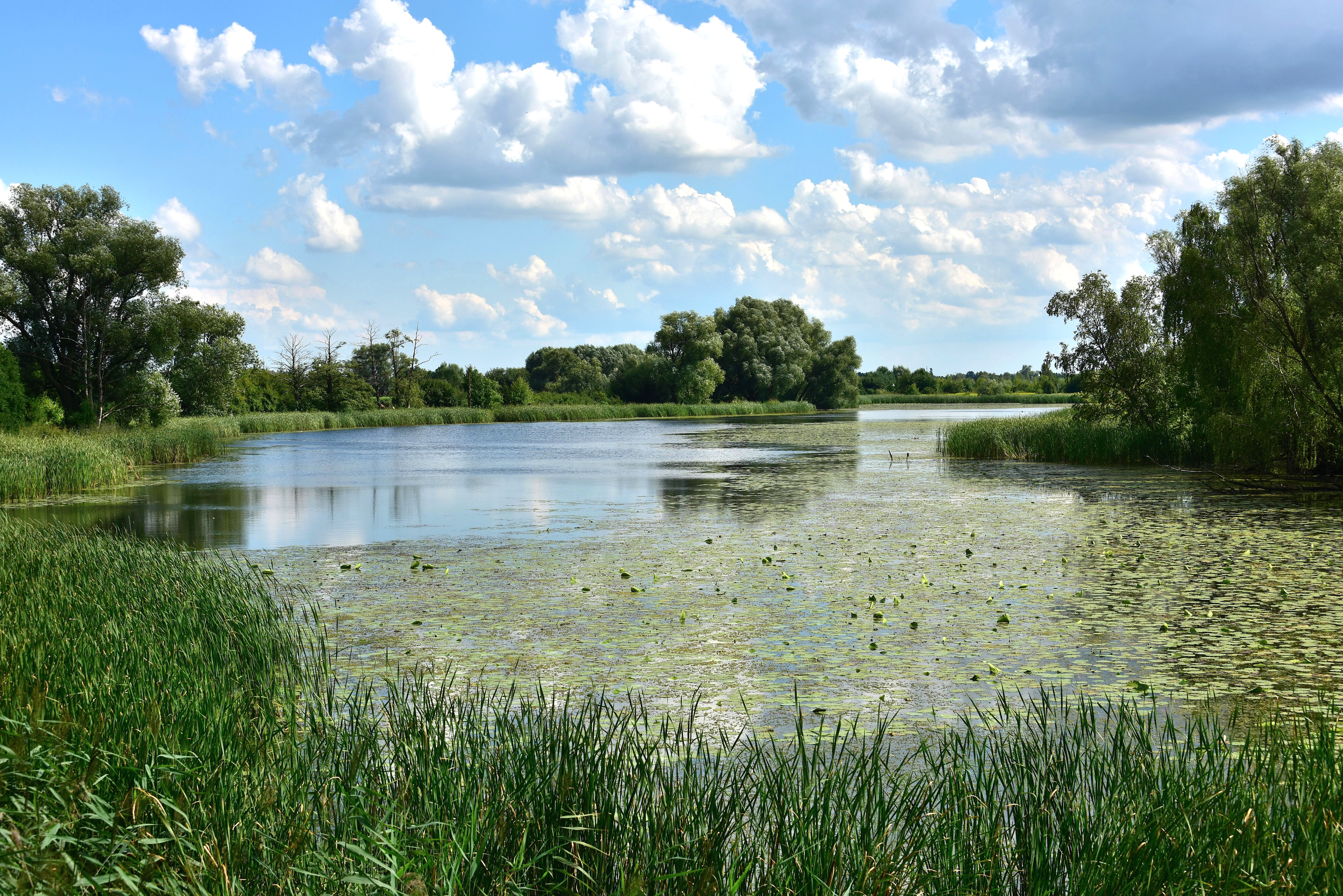
The Powsinek Lake.

Majority of the area of Powsinek is covered by farmlands, as well as a large grass field, known as Łąki Kośne. The northern part of the neighbourhood includes the Powsinek Lake, an oxbow lake of the Vistula river, with an area of 10.92 ha. The Powsinek Lake, an oxbow lake of the Vistula river, is also located in the northern part of the neighbourhood. Powsinek is also crossed by two water ditches, Natolin and Powsinek, which outflow into the Powsinek Lake. A majority of the neighbourhood eastern boundary is also marked by the Wilanówka river.

The neighbourhood also includes the Powsinek ecological site, with an area of 2.8518, which was established in 2002, to protect habitats of the scarce large blue butterfly and the Myrmica genus of ants. A portion of the neighbourhood is also a part of the Warsaw Protected Landscape Area, which was created in 1997.

== Location and boundaries ==
Powsinek is a City Information System area in Warsaw, located in the central east portion of the Wilanów district. Its boundaries are approximately determined to the northwest by Vogla Street, to the east by Ruczaj Street and the Wilanówksa river, to the south by Strumień Street, and continued to the intersection of Drewny and Przyczółkowa Streets, and to the west by Przyczółkowa Street. The neighbourhood borders Wilanów Królewski to the north, Kępa Zawadowska and Zawady to the east, Powsin to the south, and Wilanów Fileds to the west.
