= Nature reserves in Poland =

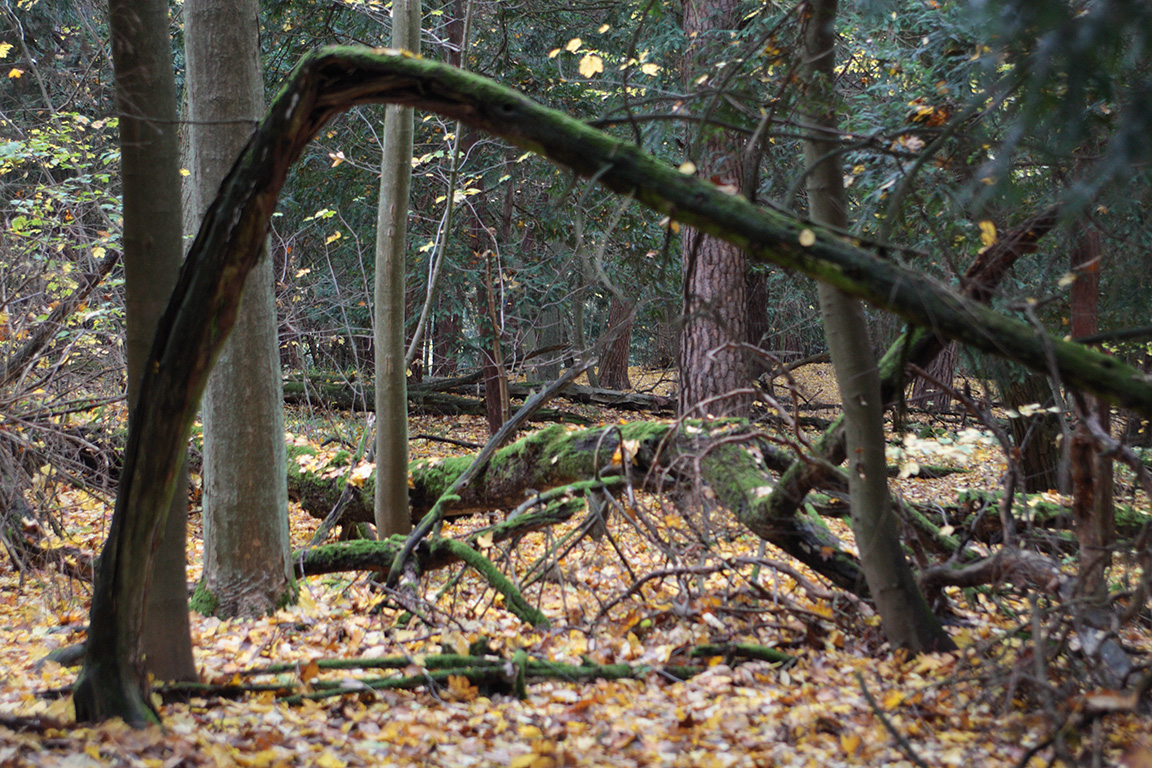
Leon Wyczółkowski's Cisy Staropolskie Nature Preserve, likely the oldest nature reserve in Poland

Nature reserves in Poland (Polish: rezerwaty przyrody w Polsce) cover a total area of 1,644,634 hectares (4,063,980 acres), representing 0.53% of the territory of Poland. As of 2011, Poland has 1469 nature reserves.

The total area of the nature reserves in Poland has expanded since 1980 when they covered only about 80,000 hectares (200,000 acres). By 1990 this increased to 117,000 hectares (290,000 acres) (0.37% of the territory of Poland) Their number has also expanded (in 2000 they numbered 1307). However, the area of the natural reserves under strict protection (pod ochroną ścisłą) has decreased from 7,200 hectares (18,000 acres) in 1990 to 3,700 hectares (9,100 acres) as of 2011. The area of nature reserves in Poland was highest around in 2008, when they approached 180,000 hectares (440,000 acres).

Nature reserves in Poland are divided into: fauna (141), landscape (108), forest (722), peat-bog (177), flora (169), water (44), inanimate nature (72), steppe (32) and halophyte (4). Another division is into the regular and strict nature reserves; the strict ones see no human activity, whereas the regular one see limited maintenance.

According to Łonkiewicz, the first nature reserve on the Polish lands was the Pamiątka Pieniacka (near Lwów), 50 hectares large, established by count Włodzimierz Dzieduszycki in 1886. As Rąkowski also notes, that nature reserve is no longer in the borders of modern Poland (it is now in Ukraine), and the oldest nature reserve on modern Polish lands may be the Baranowiec Nature Reserve (Rezerwat przyrody Barnowiec) established in 1903. Boiński as well Łachowski et al. however note that the oldest preserve may be the Leon Wyczółkowski's Cisy Staropolskie Nature Preserve (Rezerwat przyrody Cisy Staropolskie im. Leona Wyczółkowskiego), whose establishment dates to 1827.

Some of the best known nature reserves in Poland include: Białowieża Forest Nature Reserve (Rezerwat przyrody Lasy Naturalne Puszczy Białowieskiej), Leon Wyczółkowski's Cisy Staropolskie Nature Preserve (Rezerwat przyrody Cisy Staropolskie im. Leona Wyczółkowskiego), Olszyny Niezgodzkie Nature Reserve (Rezerwat przyrody Olszyny Niezgodzkie), Modrzewina Nature Reserve (Rezerwat przyrody Modrzewina) and the Stefan Starzyński's Kabacki's Forest Nature Reserve (Rezerwat przyrody Las Kabacki im. Stefana Starzyńskiego).

== Size of nature reserves by voivodeship ==
The voivodeship with the highest total number of nature reserves is the Masovian Voivodeship, and the lowest, the Opole Voivodeship. With regard to the total area, the highest is the Podlaskie Voivodeship, and the lowest is the Opole Voivodeship.

| Voivodeship | Size of nature reserves | Number of nature reserves |
|---|---|---|
| Lower Silesian (dolnośląskie) | 104,915 hectares (259,250 acres) | 66 |
| Kuyavian-Pomeranian (kujawsko-pomorskie) | 94,932 hectares (234,580 acres) | 94 |
| Lublin (lubelskie) | 115,496 hectares (285,400 acres) | 85 |
| Lubusz (lubuskie) | 37,763 hectares (93,310 acres) | 61 |
| Łódź (łódzkie) | 74,401 hectares (183,850 acres) | 89 |
| Lesser Poland (małopolskie) | 33,495 hectares (82,770 acres) | 85 |
| Masovian (mazowieckie) | 179,904 hectares (444,550 acres) | 185 |
| Opolskie (opolskie) | 8,951 hectares (22,120 acres) | 35 |
| Podkarpackie (podkarpackie) | 109,895 hectares (271,560 acres) | 94 |
| Podlaskie (podlaskie) | 235,319 hectares (581,490 acres) | 93 |
| Pomeranian (pomorskie) | 87,773 hectares (216,890 acres) | 130 |
| Silesian (śląskie) | 87,773 hectares (216,890 acres) | 64 |
| Świętokrzyskie | 38,208 hectares (94,410 acres) | 72 |
| Warmian-Masurian (warmińsko-mazurskie) | 312,479 hectares (772,150 acres) | 108 |
| Greater Poland (wielkopolskie) | 41,138 hectares (101,650 acres) | 98 |
| West Pomeranian (zachodniopomorskie) | 128,389 hectares (317,260 acres) | 114 |

== See also ==
- Protected areas of Poland
