= Wilanów =

- District of Warsaw
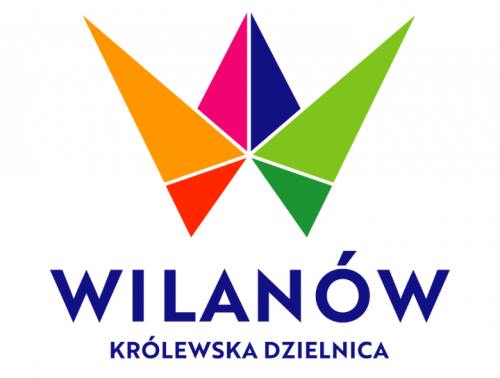
- Coat of arms Brandmark

- Location of Wilanów within Warsaw
- Coordinates: 52°10′N 21°05′E
- Country: Poland
- Voivodeship: Masovian
- County/City: Warsaw
- Notable landmarks: Wilanów Palace, Poster Museum, palace park

Government
  - Mayor: Ludwik Rakowski

Area
  - Total: 36.73 km^{2} (14.18 sq mi)

Population (2019)
  - Total: 40,060
  - Density: 1,091/km^{2} (2,825/sq mi)
- Time zone: UTC+1 (CET)
  - Summer (DST): UTC+2 (CEST)
- Area code: +48 22
- Website: wilanow.um.warszawa.pl

Wilanów (Polish pronunciation: [vʲiˈlanuf]) is a district of the city of Warsaw, Poland. It is home to historic Wilanów Palace, the "Polish Versailles," and second home to various Polish kings. Wilanów is home to many villas and, despite being relatively far away from the city center, the district ranks among the most expensive in Warsaw.

== History ==
The first mentions of a settlement in the area can be traced to the 13th century, when a village named Milanów was founded by the Benedictine monastery of Płock. In 1338 it became a private property of the Dukes of Mazovia and in 1378 Prince Janusz I of Warsaw gave it to one of his servants. It was he who established the first mansion and a chapel in the village. His descendants adopted the name Milanowski, after the name of the village.

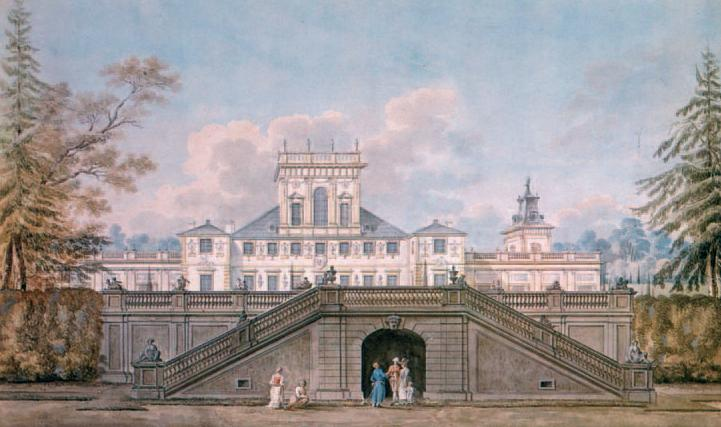
Wilanów Palace as seen from the park by Zygmunt Vogel, 1791-92.

In the 17th century the village was bought by the family of Stanisław Leszczyński, who started the construction of a new palace; however, the works were stopped by The Deluge when the forces of Sweden captured the area and plundered it completely. In 1676 the depopulated village was bought by King Jan III Sobieski. By his order, Tylman van Gameren and Augustyn Wincenty Locci erected the new baroque-style palace and St. Anne's Church. Initially the palace was named Villa Nova (New Village), to distinguish it from the nearby village of Stara Wieś (Old Village). However, soon the name was polonised to Wilanów, similar to the former name Milanów.

Thanks to the proximity of both the kings' summer residence and the city of Warsaw, Wilanów has for ages been a suburb of Warsaw and a popular holiday spot for Polish magnates. It was also the final point on the historical Royal Road. In the 18th century, the palace became the property of Hetman Adam Mikołaj Sieniawski. His widow, Elżbieta Sieniawska, joined the village with the nearby villages of Kabaty, Powsin and Wolica. After that both the so-called key of villages (group of villages run together by a common owner) and the palace changed hands several times, with each new owner changing something in the look of the palace.

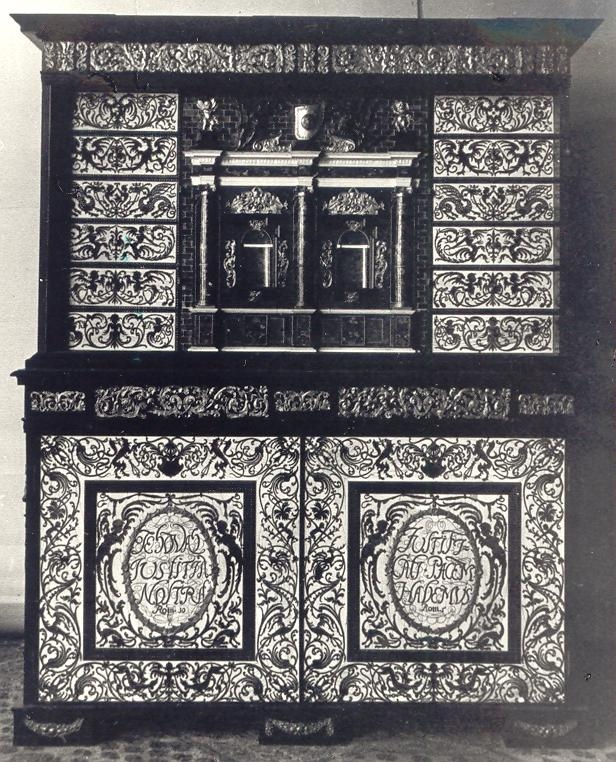
Tortoise-shell cabinet of John III Sobieski, looted by the Germans from the Wilanów Palace during World War II

In 1863, after the fall of the January Uprising, the Russian authorities introduced a new administrative division, stripping the key of the rest of villages and making Wilanów a capital of all the communes located south of it. The area became one of the most important providers of food for ever-growing Warsaw and in 1890 a horse-drawn railway was opened for transport of grain and passengers. The line linking Wilanów with Warsaw's Lublin Union Square proved to be a major success and in 1892 the line was extended and started to run steam-drawn trains. Also, new railway stations were built on both ends of the line.

After World War II the palaces in Wilanów, Natolin and Morysin were nationalised by the new communist authorities of Poland. The former was converted into a museum and in one of the palace's barracks a Museum of Posters was opened on 4 June 1968. It is probably the only such museum in Europe. In 1951 Wilanów was incorporated into Warsaw. Initially a separate unit of administrative division, in 1976 it was joined with the borough of Mokotów. In 1994 it became a separate unit of administrative division and the following year it became one of the boroughs of Warsaw.

Currently, the surrounding area is home to many expatriates living in Warsaw, as this area is home to many international schools. However, in 2000, the American School of Warsaw moved about 6 km out, to the suburb of Konstancin-Jeziorna.

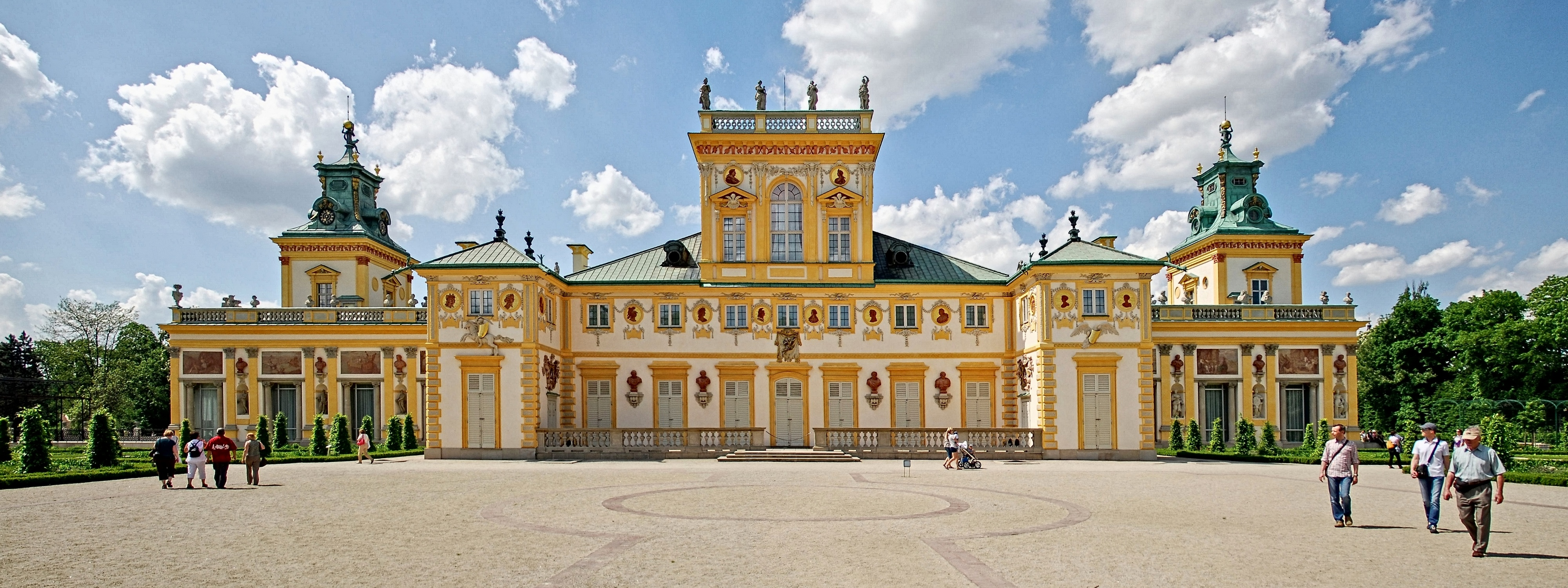
Wilanów Palace, view from the Royal Gardens

== Neighbourhoods within the district ==
- Wilanów Wysoki
- Wilanów Niski
- Wilanów Królewski
- Błonia Wilanowskie
- Powsinek
- Zawady
- Kępa Zawadowska
- Powsin

== See also ==
- Temple of Divine Providence
- Museum of John Paul II and Primate Wyszyński
