= Ksawery Branicki (1864–1926) =

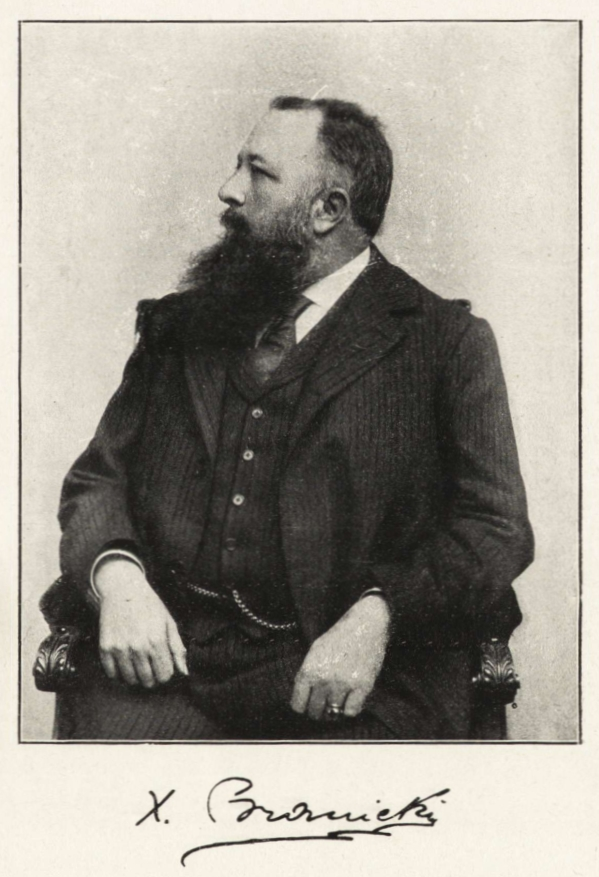

Count Ksawery Władysław Branicki or Xavier Branicki (19 April 1864 – 18 June 1926) was a Polish landowner, nobleman, and naturalist.

Branicki was the son of Count Konstantin Branicki (1824–1884) and Countess Jadwiga Potocka (1827–1916) who owned estate in the Kiev region and the Montresor Castle in France. Branicki was involved in the maintenance of the museum begun by his father and continued to fund the collection of specimens from South America and Africa. He left Kiev in 1915 and his estates in Ukraine were taken over Polish-Soviet War of 1919–1921. The museum was transferred to the Polish government in 1919.

He married a cousin, Countess Anna Maria Pia Rose Potocka (1863–1953), daughter of Adam Józef Mateusz Potocki (1822–1872) and Countess Katharina Branicka (1825–1907) in 1886 and they had five children.
