= La Grange d'Arquien =

La Grange d'Arquien was a French noble family. People with that name included:

- Henri Albert de La Grange d'Arquien, Marquis of Arquien (1613– 1707)
- Louise Marie de La Grange d'Arquien (1638–1728), French noblewoman
- Marie Casimire Louise de La Grange d'Arquien (1641–1716), queen consort to King John III Sobieski of Poland from 1674 to 1696
- Paul-François de La Grange d'Arquien (c. 1670–1745), French naval officer and colonial administrator
