= Konstanty Władysław Sobieski =

Polish nobleman and scholar

- Prince of Poland
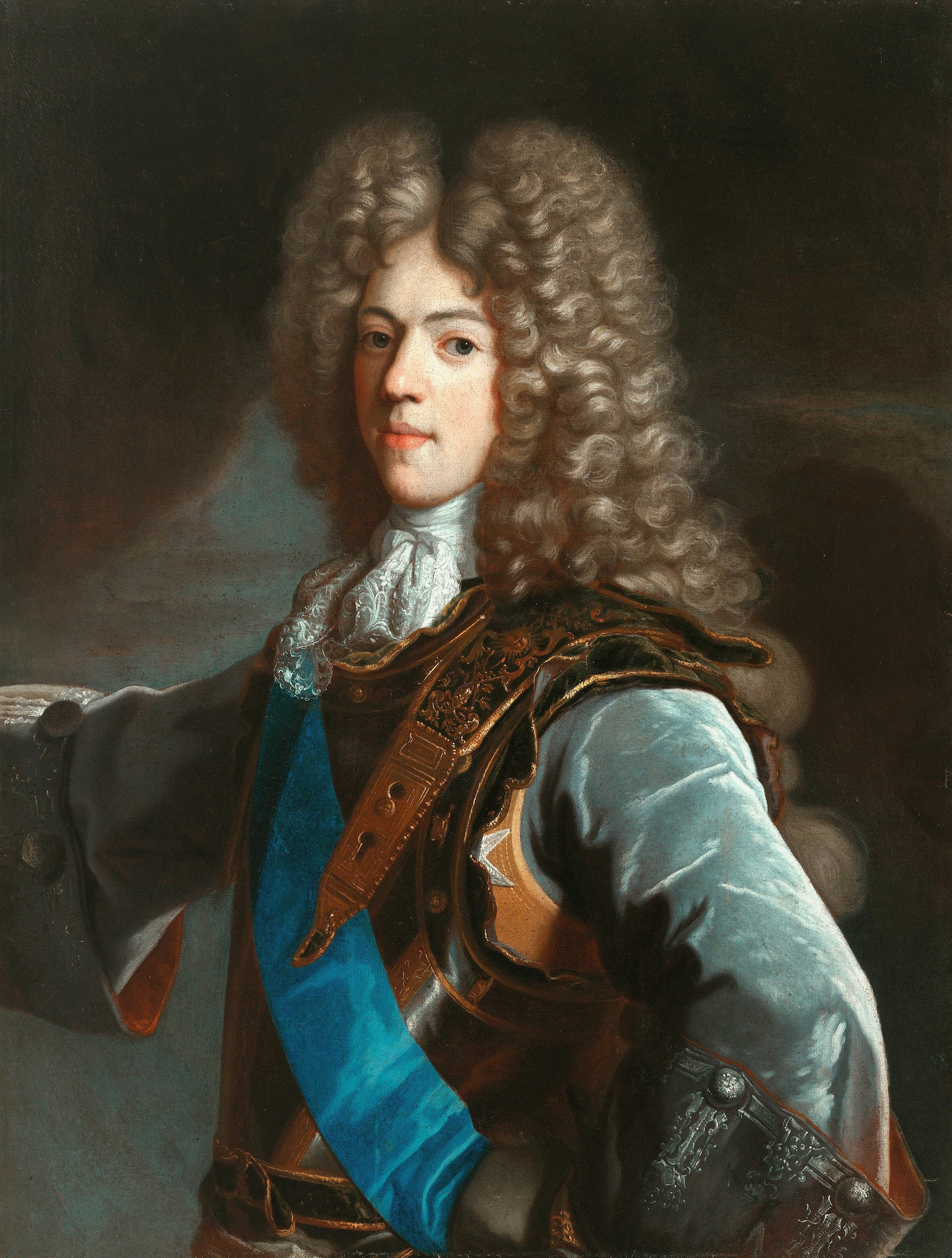
- Portrait by Hyacinthe Rigaud
- Born: 1 May 1680; Warsaw, Poland
- Died: 28 February 1726 (aged 45); Żółkiew, Poland
- Family: Sobieski
- Spouse: Maria Józefa Wessel (m. 1708)
- Father: John III Sobieski
- Mother: Marie Casimire Louise de la Grange d'Arquien

Konstanty Władysław Sobieski (1 May 1680 – 28 February 1726) was a Polish prince, nobleman, politician, diplomat, and scholar. The son of John III Sobieski, King of Poland, and his wife, Marie Casimire Louise de la Grange d'Arquien, Sobieski married Maria Józefa Wessel in 1708.

== Early life and career ==
Konstanty Władysław Sobieski was the youngest son of John III Sobieski. His first tutor was Karlo Mauricio Vota, a Jesuit. Later his teacher became Remigian Suszycki from the University of Cracow and "chevelier de Neufmaison", who taught him about military. Konstanty also learned Italian and French.

== Ancestors ==
Marek Sobieski
Jakub Sobieski
Jadwiga Snopkowska
Jan III Sobieski
Jan Daniłowicz
Zofia Teofila Daniłowicz
Zofia Żółkiewska
Konstanty Władysław Sobieski
Antoine de La Grange d'Arquien
Henri Albert de La Grange d'Arquien
Anne d'Ancienville
Marie Casimire Louise
Baptiste de La Châtre of Bruillebault
Françoise de La Châtre
Gabrielle Lamy
