= John III Sobieski =

Ruler of Poland–Lithuania from 1674 to 1696

- Defender of the Faith
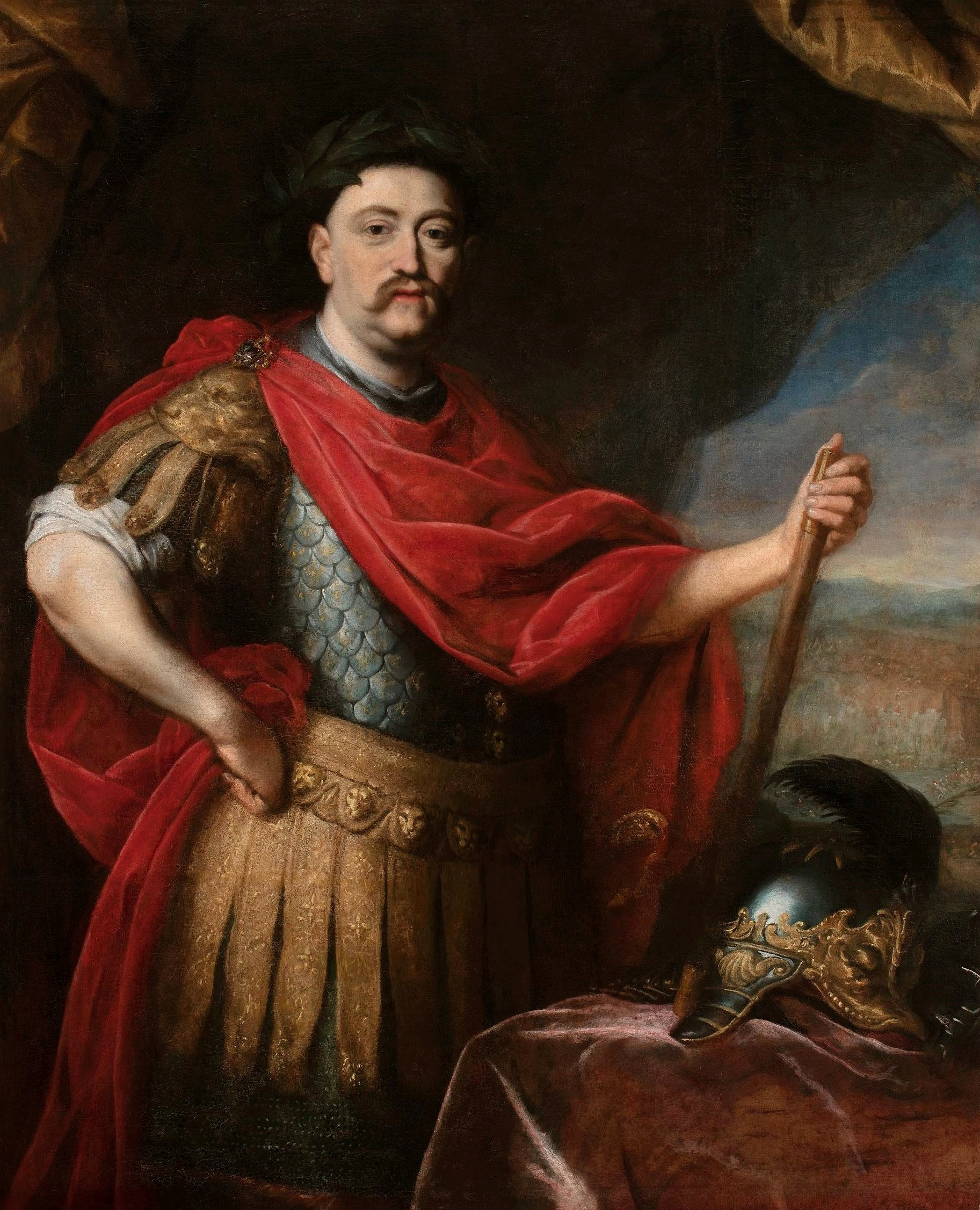
- Portrait by Daniel Schultz, c. 1680

King of Poland Grand Duke of Lithuania
- Reign: 19 May 1674 – 17 June 1696
- Coronation: 2 February 1676
- Predecessor: Michał Korybut Wiśniowiecki
- Successor: Augustus II the Strong
- Born: 17 August 1629; Olesko Castle, Olesko, Polish–Lithuanian Commonwealth
- Died: 17 June 1696 (aged 66); Wilanów Palace, Warsaw, Polish–Lithuanian Commonwealth
- Burial: Wawel Cathedral, Kraków
- Spouse: Marie Casimire d'Arquien (m. 1665)
- Issue among others...: James, Duke of Oława; Teresa, Electress of Bavaria; Prince Aleksander; Prince Konstanty
- House: Sobieski
- Father: Jakub Sobieski
- Mother: Zofia Teofillia Daniłowicz
- Religion: Roman Catholicism

John III Sobieski (Polish: Jan III Sobieski (Polish pronunciation: [ˈjan ˈtʂɛt͡ɕi sɔˈbʲɛskʲi]); Lithuanian: Jonas III Sobieskis (Lithuanian pronunciation: ['joːnäs so'bʲɛskis]); Latin: Ioannes III Sobiscius (Latin pronunciation: [joˈannɛs soˈbiʃiʊs]) 17 August 1629 – 17 June 1696) was King of Poland and Grand Duke of Lithuania from 1674 until his death in 1696.

Born into Polish nobility, Sobieski was educated at the Jagiellonian University and toured Europe in his youth. As a soldier and later commander, he fought in the Khmelnytsky Uprising, the Russo-Polish War and during the Swedish invasion known as the Deluge. Sobieski demonstrated his military prowess during the war against the Ottoman Empire and established himself as a leading figure in Poland and Lithuania. In 1674, he was elected monarch of the Polish–Lithuanian Commonwealth following the sudden and unexpected death of King Michael Korybut Wiśniowiecki.

Sobieski's 22-year reign marked a period of the Commonwealth's stabilization, much needed after the turmoil of previous conflicts. Popular among his subjects, he was an able military leader, most famously for his victory over the Ottoman Empire at the Battle of Vienna in 1683. The defeated Ottomans named Sobieski the "Lion of Lechistan", and the Pope hailed him as the saviour of Western Christendom. Suffering from poor health and obesity in later life, Sobieski died in 1696 and was buried at Wawel Cathedral in Kraków. He was succeeded by Augustus II the Strong.

== Biography ==
=== Youth ===
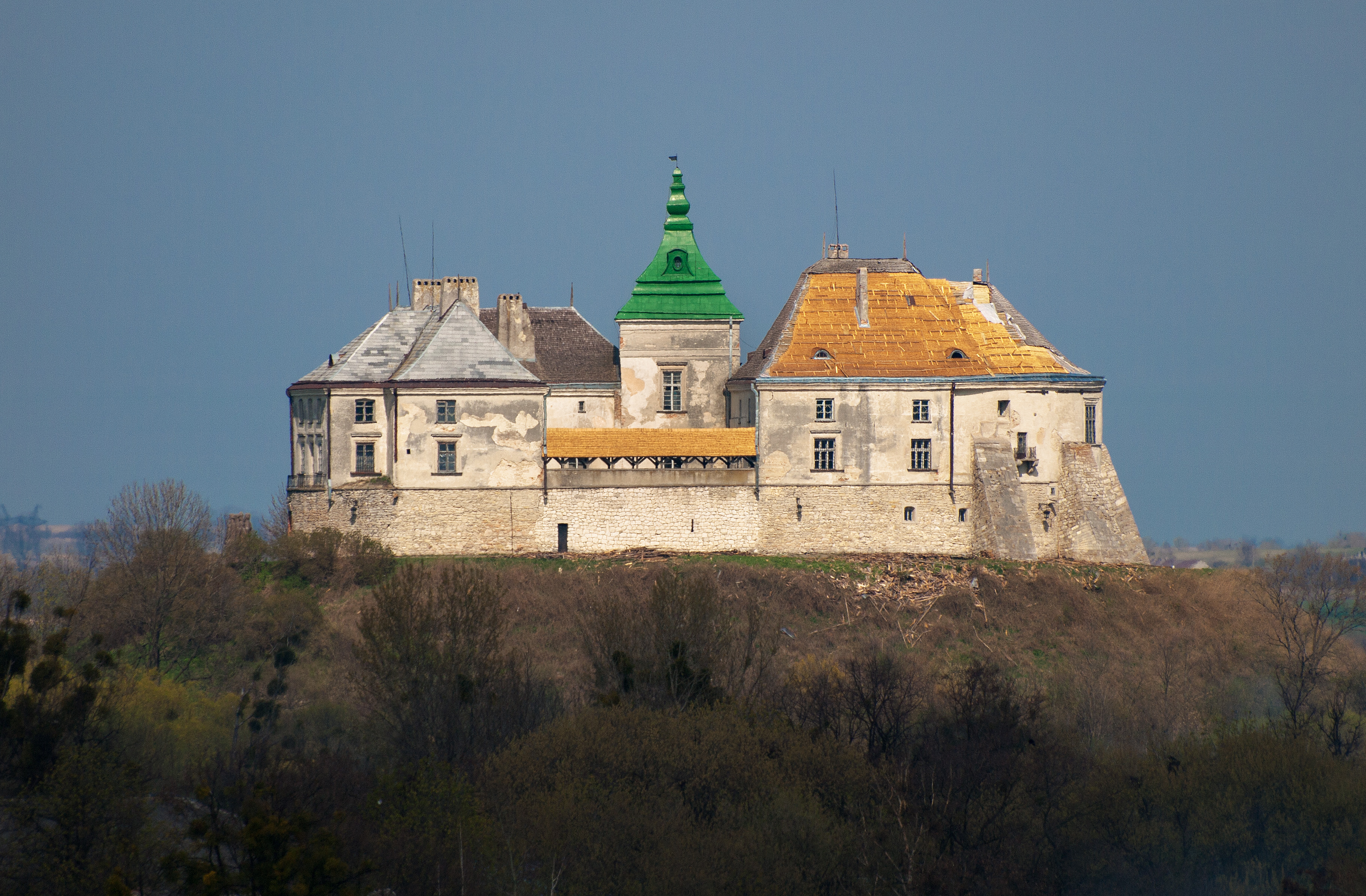
Olesko Castle, the birthplace of John Sobieski

John Sobieski was born on 17 August 1629, in Olesko, now in Ukraine, then part of the Ruthenian Voivodeship in the Crown of the Kingdom of Poland, Polish–Lithuanian Commonwealth to a renowned noble family de Sobieszyn Sobieski of Janina coat of arms. His father, Jakub Sobieski, was the Voivode of Ruthenia and Castellan of Kraków; his mother, Zofia Teofillia Daniłowicz was a granddaughter of Hetman Stanisław Żółkiewski. John Sobieski spent his childhood in Żółkiew. After graduating from Bartłomiej Nowodworski College in Kraków in 1643, young John Sobieski then graduated from the philosophical faculty of the University of Kraków in 1646. After finishing his studies, John and his brother Marek Sobieski left for western Europe, where he spent more than two years travelling. They visited Leipzig, Antwerp, Paris, London, Leiden, and The Hague. During that time, he met influential contemporary figures such as Louis II de Bourbon, Charles II of England and William II, Prince of Orange, and learned French, German, and Italian, in addition to Latin.

Both brothers returned to the Commonwealth in 1648. Upon receiving the news of the death of King Władysław IV Vasa and the hostilities of the Khmelnytsky Uprising, they volunteered for the army. They both fought in the siege of Zamość. They founded and commanded their own banners (chorągiew) of cavalry (one light, "cossack", and one heavy, of Polish hussars). Soon, the fortunes of war separated the brothers. In 1649, Jakub fought in the Battle of Zboriv. In 1652, Marek died in Cossack captivity after his capture at the Battle of Batih. John was promoted to the rank of pułkownik and fought with distinction in the Battle of Berestechko. In 1653, he voluntarily spent time as a hostage in the Crimean Tatar capital of Bakhchysarai. A promising commander, John was sent by King John II Casimir Vasa as one of the envoys in the diplomatic mission of Mikołaj Bieganowski to the Ottoman Empire. There, Sobieski learned the Tatar language and the Turkish language and studied Ottoman military traditions and tactics. It is likely he participated as part of the briefly allied Polish-Tatar forces in the 1655 Battle of Okhmativ.

After the start of the Swedish invasion of Poland, also known as "The Deluge", John Sobieski was among the Greater Polish regiments led by Krzysztof Opaliński, Palatine of Poznań which capitulated at Ujście, and swore allegiance to King Charles X Gustav of Sweden. However, around late March 1656, he abandoned their side, returning to the side of Polish king John II Casimir Vasa, enlisting under the command of hetmans Stefan Czarniecki and Jerzy Sebastian Lubomirski.

=== Commander ===
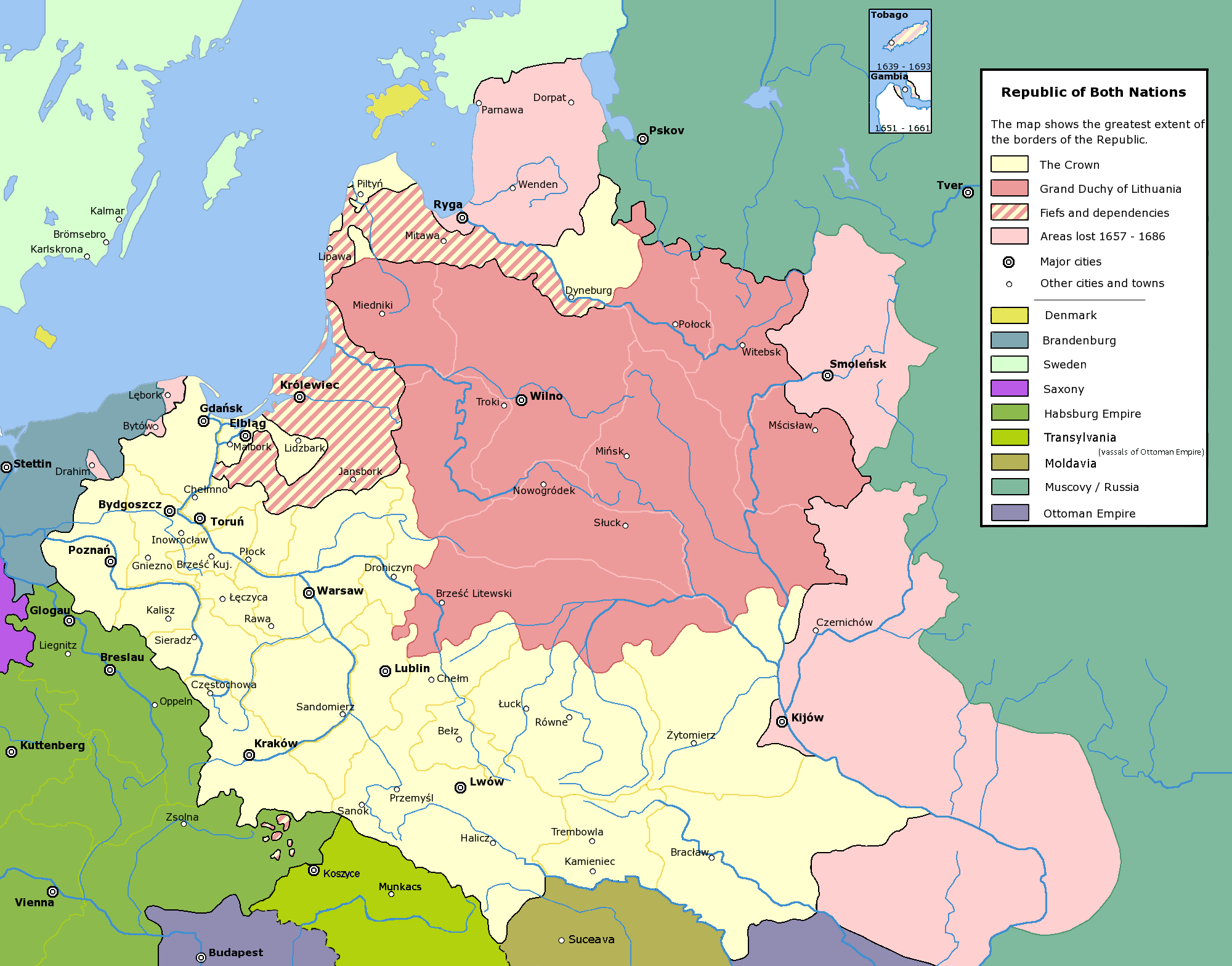
The Polish–Lithuanian Commonwealth in 1657

By 26 May 1656, he received the position of the chorąży koronny (Standard-bearer of the Crown). During the three-day-long battle of Warsaw of 1656, Sobieski commanded a regiment of 2,000 men of Tatar cavalry. He took part in a number of engagements over the next two years, including the Siege of Toruń in 1658. In 1659, he was elected a deputy to the Sejm (Polish parliament), and was one of the Polish negotiators of the Treaty of Hadiach with the Cossacks. In 1660, he took part in the last offensive against the Swedes in Prussia, and was rewarded with the office of starost of Stryi. Soon afterward he took part in the war against the Russians, participating in the Battle of Slobodyshche and Battle of Lyubar, and later that year he again was one of the negotiators of a new treaty with the Cossacks (the Treaty of Chudnov).

Through personal connections, he became a strong supporter of the French faction in the Polish royal court, represented by Queen Marie Louise Gonzaga. His pro-French allegiance was reinforced in 1665, when he married Marie Casimire d'Arquien and was promoted to the rank of the Crown Grand Marshal.

In 1662, he was again elected a deputy to the Sejm and took part in the work on reforming the military. He was also a member of the Sejm in 1664 and 1665. In between, he participated in the Russian campaign of 1663. Sobieski remained loyal to the King during the Lubomirski Rebellion of 1665–1666, though it was a difficult decision for him. He participated in the Sejm of 1665, and after some delays, accepted the prestigious office of the Marshal of the Crown on 18 May that year. Around late April or early May 1666 he received another high office of the Commonwealth, that of the Field Crown Hetman. Soon afterward, he was defeated at the Battle of Mątwy, and signed the Agreement of Łęgonice on 21 July, which ended the Lubomirski Rebellion.

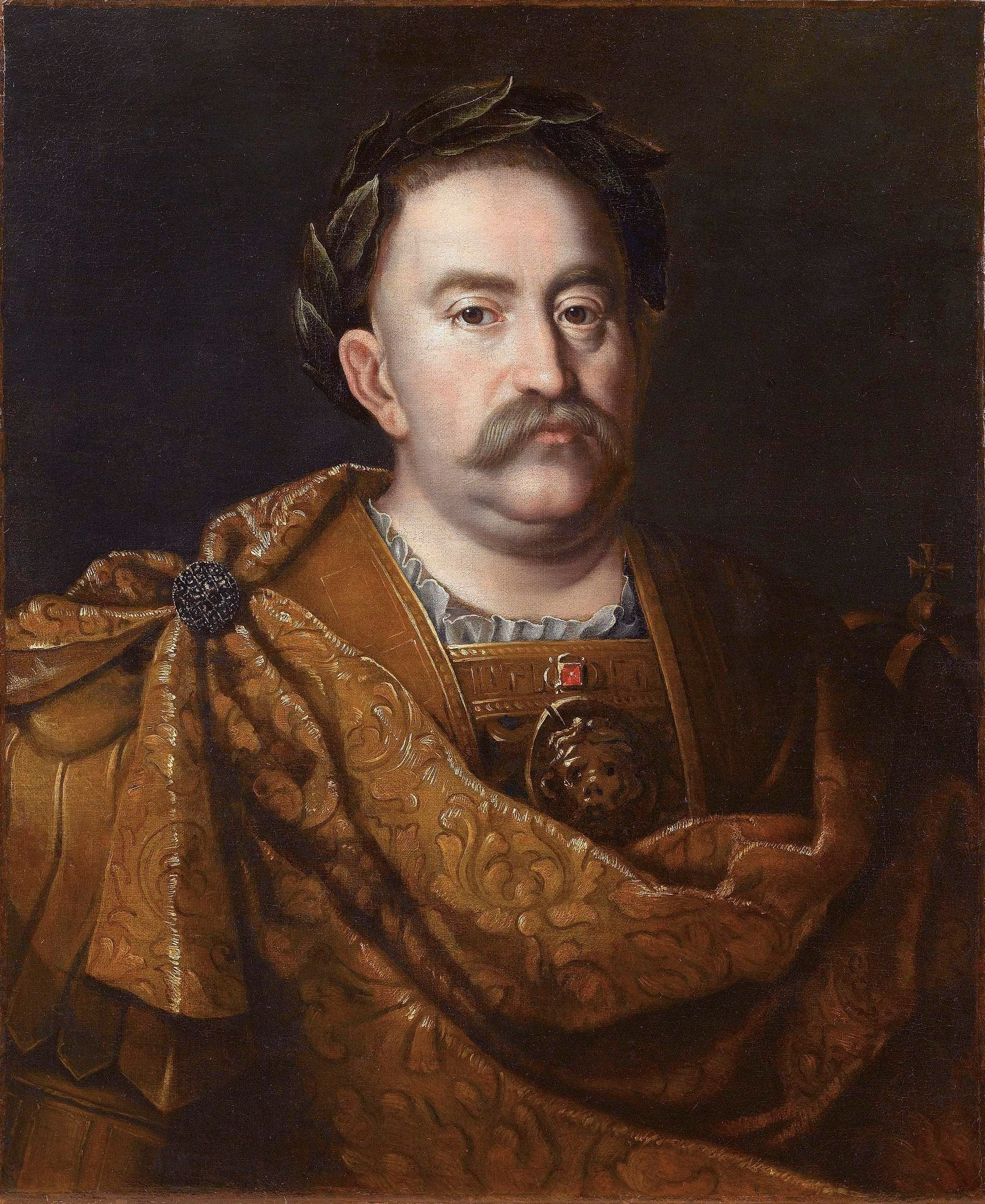
Portrait of John III Sobieski in Roman armour and a laurel wreath.

In October 1667, he achieved another victory over the Cossacks of Petro Doroshenko and their Crimean Tatar allies in the Battle of Podhajce during the Polish–Cossack–Tatar War (1666–1671). This allowed him to regain his image as a skilled military leader. Later that year, in November, his first child, James Louis Sobieski, was born in Paris. On 5 February 1668, he achieved the rank of Grand Hetman of the Crown, the highest military rank in the Polish–Lithuanian Commonwealth, and thereby the de facto commander-in-chief of the entire Polish Army. Later that year he supported the French candidacy of Louis, Grand Condé for the Polish throne, and after this candidacy fell apart, Philip William, Elector Palatine. Following the election of Michał Korybut Wiśniowiecki he joined the opposition faction; he and his allies helped veto several sejms (including the coronation ones), and his attitude once again resulted in him losing popularity among the regular szlachta. While his pro-French stance in politics alienated some, his military victories against invading Tatars in 1671 helped him gain other allies.

The year 1672 saw internal politics destabilising the Commonwealth, as the pro-French faction of Sobieski and the pro-court faction of King Michał formed two Confederations (konfederacja), which, despite major Ottoman incursions in the south, seemed more concerned with one another than with uniting to defend the country. The court faction called openly for confiscation of his estates and dismissal from office, and declared him an "enemy of the state". This division culminated in the humiliating Treaty of Buchach, where the Commonwealth was forced to cede territories to the Ottomans, but promise an annual tribute. Sobieski eventually succeeded in balancing politics and national defense, and a combination of his military victories over the invaders, and successful negotiations at the Sejm in April 1673, led to a compromise in which the court faction dropped its demands and challenges against him.

In the year 1672, the Polish-Lithuanian Tatars rose up in open rebellion against the Commonwealth. This was the widely remembered Lipka rebellion. Thanks to the efforts of Sobieski, who was held in great esteem by the Tatar soldiers, many of the Lipkas seeking asylum and service in the Ottoman Army returned to his command.

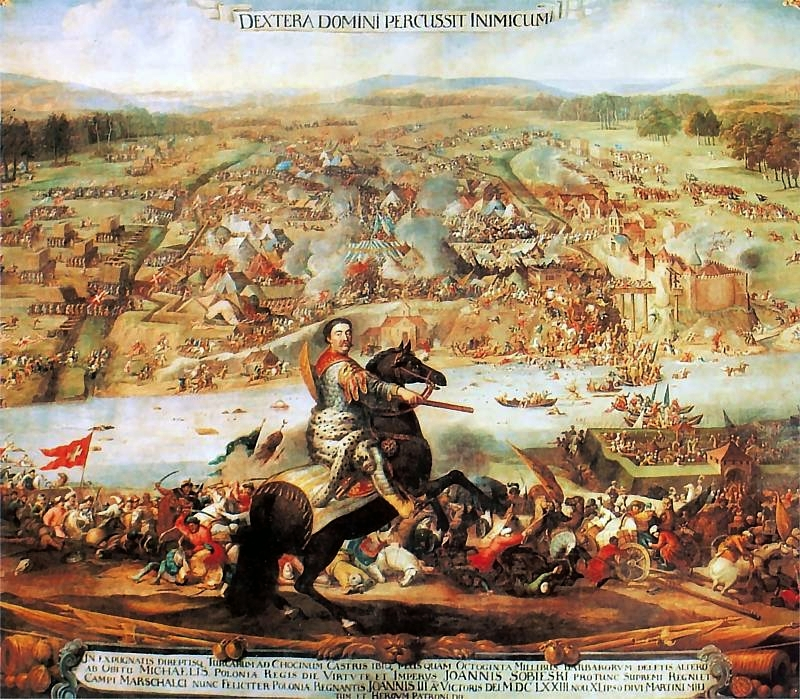
John III Sobieski, the victor of the Battle of Khotyn (Chocim) in 1673

On 11 November 1673, Sobieski added a major victory to his list, this time defeating the Ottomans in the Battle of Khotyn (Chocim) and capturing the fortress located there. The news of the battle coincided with the death of King Michal the day before the battle. This made Sobieski one of the leading figures of the state, so on 19 May the following year, he was elected monarch of the Commonwealth. His candidacy was almost universally supported, with only a dozen or so members of the diet opposing him (mainly centered around magnates of the Lithuanian Pac family). In light of the war, requiring Sobieski to be on the front lines, the coronation ceremony was significantly delayed – he was crowned John III almost two years later, on 2 February 1676.

=== King of Poland ===
Though Poland-Lithuania was at that time the largest and one of the most populous states of Europe, Sobieski became a king of a country devastated by almost half a century of constant war. The treasury was almost empty and the court had little to offer the powerful magnates, who often allied themselves with foreign courts rather than the state.

Sobieski had a number of long-term plans, including establishing his own dynasty in the Commonwealth, regaining lost territories, and strengthening the country through various reforms. One of his ambitions was to unify Christian Europe in a crusade to drive the Turks out of Europe. At the beginning of his reign, however, the Polish state was in dire fiscal straits and faced military threats to the north. King Louis XIV of France promised to mediate a truce between the Ottomans and Poland so that Sobieski could focus his attentions on Prussia. The negotiations ended in failure and Sobieski's Baltic goals had to be tempered by the immediate reality of the Ottoman threat to the south.

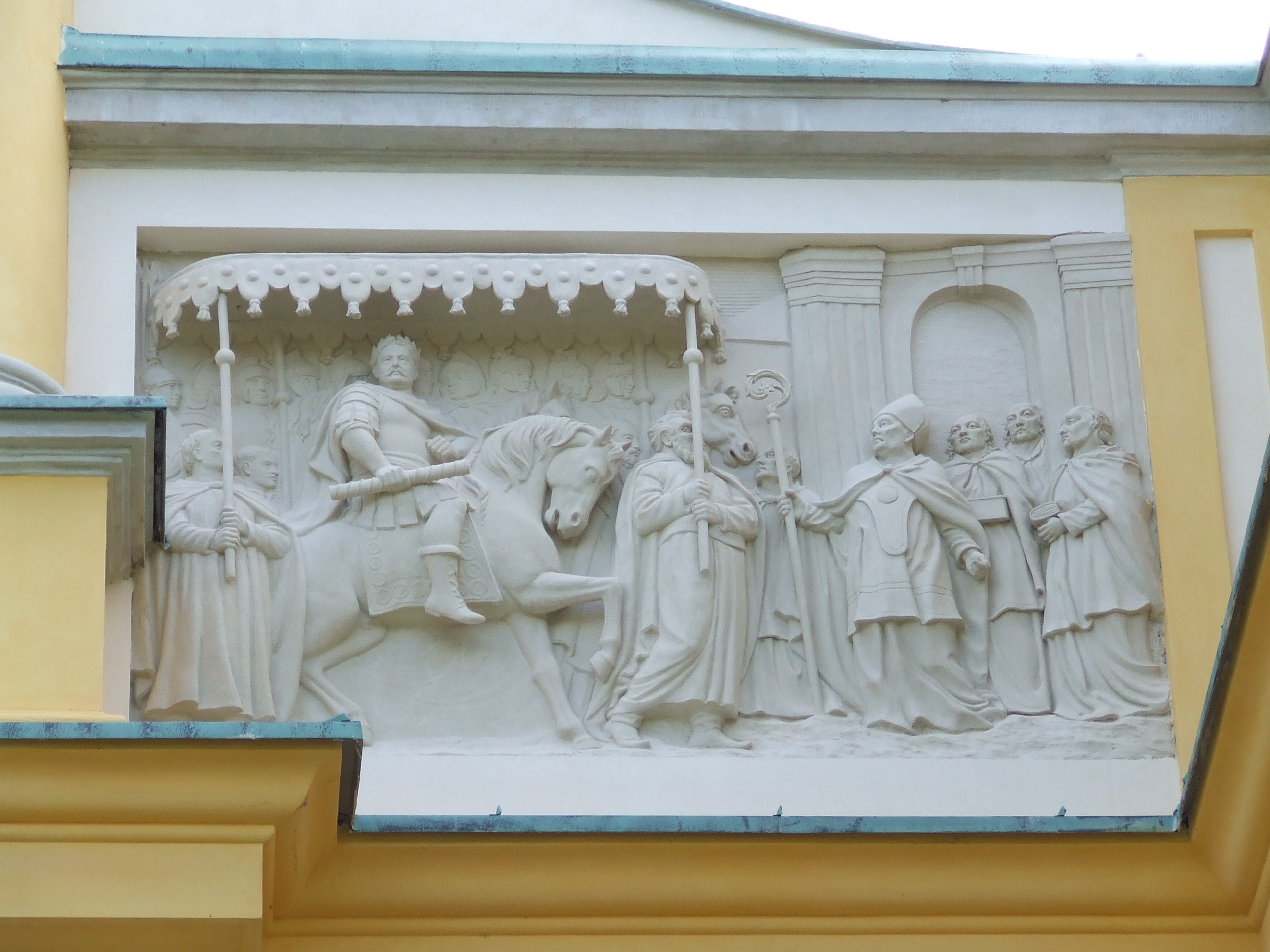
Sobieski's coronation (1676), relief, Wilanów Palace, Warsaw

In the autumn of 1674, he recommenced the war against the Ottomans and managed to recapture a number of cities and fortresses, including Bratslav, Mogilev, and Bar, which re-established a strongly fortified line defending Poland's southern border in Ukraine. In 1675, Sobieski defeated a Turkish and Tatar offensive aiming at Lwów. In 1676, the Tatars began a counter-offensive and crossed the Dneper, but could not retake the strategic town of Żórawno, and a peace treaty (the Treaty of Żurawno) was signed soon afterwards. Although Kamieniec Podolski and much of Podolia remained a part of the Ottoman Empire, Poland gained the return of the towns of Bila Tserkva and Pavoloch.

The treaty with the Ottomans began a period of peace that was much needed for the repair of the country and the strengthening of the royal authority. Sobieski managed to reform the Polish army completely. The army was reorganised into regiments, the infantry finally dropped pikes, replacing them with battle-axes, and the Polish cavalry adopted hussar and dragoon formations. Sobieski also greatly increased the number of cannon and introduced new artillery tactics.

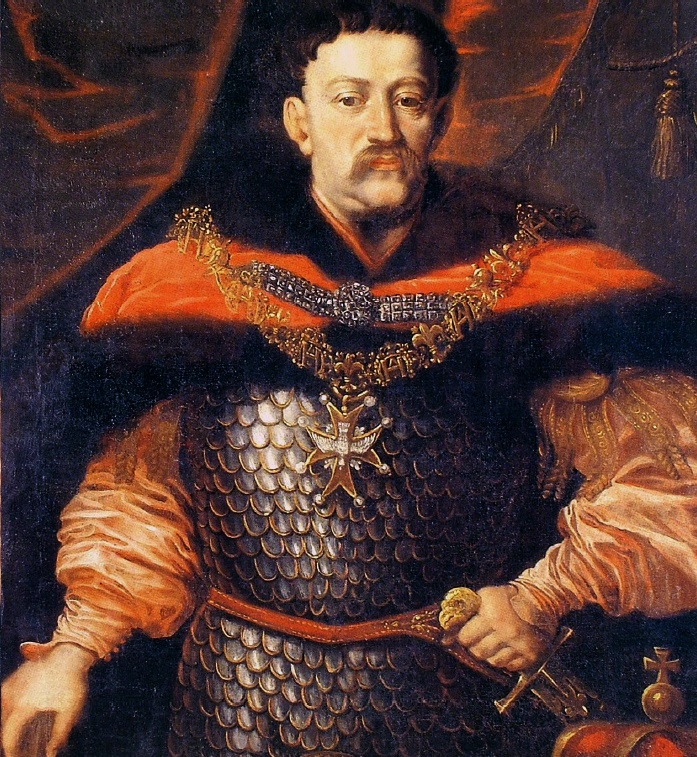
Sobieski in scale armour with the Order of the Holy Spirit, circa 1676

Sobieski wanted to conquer Prussia with Swedish troops and French support. Regaining control of this autonomous province was in the Commonwealth's best interest, and Sobieski also hoped for it to become part of his family domain. To this end he made the secret Treaty of Jaworów (1675), but he achieved nothing. The wars with the Ottoman Empire were not decisively won by the Commonwealth, the ruler of Brandenburg-Prussia made treaties with France, Prussia defeated the Swedish invasion, and Sobieski's plans for the Commonwealth's own military campaign against Prussia was opposed by Commonwealth magnates, many of them taking the Prussian side. Backed by Brandenburg and Austria, internal enemies of Sobieski even planned to dethrone him and elect Charles of Lorraine.

The French-Prussian treaty of 1679 meant that Sobieski lost the major foreign ally for his planned campaign against Prussia; consequently, he started to distance himself from the pro-French faction, which, in turn, resulted in the cooling down of the Polish-French relations. During the Sejm of 1683, the French ambassador was expelled for involvement with a plan to dethrone Sobieski, which definitely marked the end of the Polish-French alliance. At the same time, Sobieski made peace with the pro-Habsburg faction and started to gravitate towards an alliance with Austria. This did not end the existence of strong internal opposition to Sobieski; however, it changed a number of allegiances, and further opposition was temporarily weakened through the king's successful political maneuvering, including granting the Grand Hetman office to one of the opposition's chief leaders, Stanisław Jan Jabłonowski.

Conscious that Poland lacked allies and risked war against most of its neighbours (a situation similar to the Deluge), Sobieski allied himself by 1683 with Leopold I, of the Holy Roman Empire. Both sides promised to come to one's another aid if their capitals were threatened. The alliance was signed by royal representatives on 31 March 1683 and ratified by the Emperor and the Polish parliament within weeks. Although aimed directly against the Ottomans and indirectly against France, it had the advantage of gaining internal support for the defense of Poland's southern borders. This was a beginning of what would become the Holy League, championed by Pope Innocent XI to preserve Christendom.

Meantime, in the spring of 1683, royal spies uncovered Ottoman preparations for a military campaign. Sobieski had employed Greeks, who were considered natural allies, as intelligence agents, who provided him with information on the movements of Ottoman troops. He feared that the target might be the Polish cities of Lwów and Kraków. To counteract the threat, Sobieski began the fortification of the cities and ordered universal military conscription. In July, the Austrian envoy asked for Polish assistance. Soon afterwards, the Polish army started massing for an expedition against the Ottomans, and in August was joined by Bavarians and Saxon allies under Charles of Lorraine.

=== Battle of Vienna ===
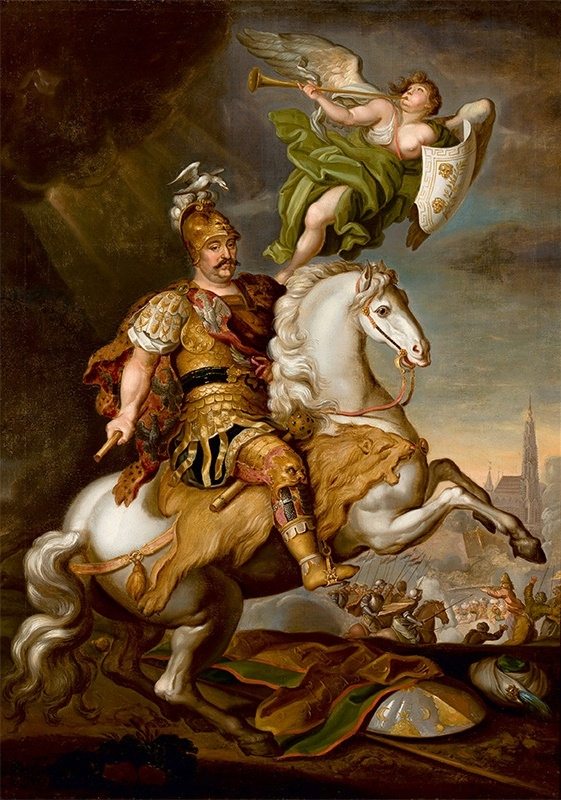
Equestrian portrait of Sobieski, by Jerzy Siemiginowski-Eleuter

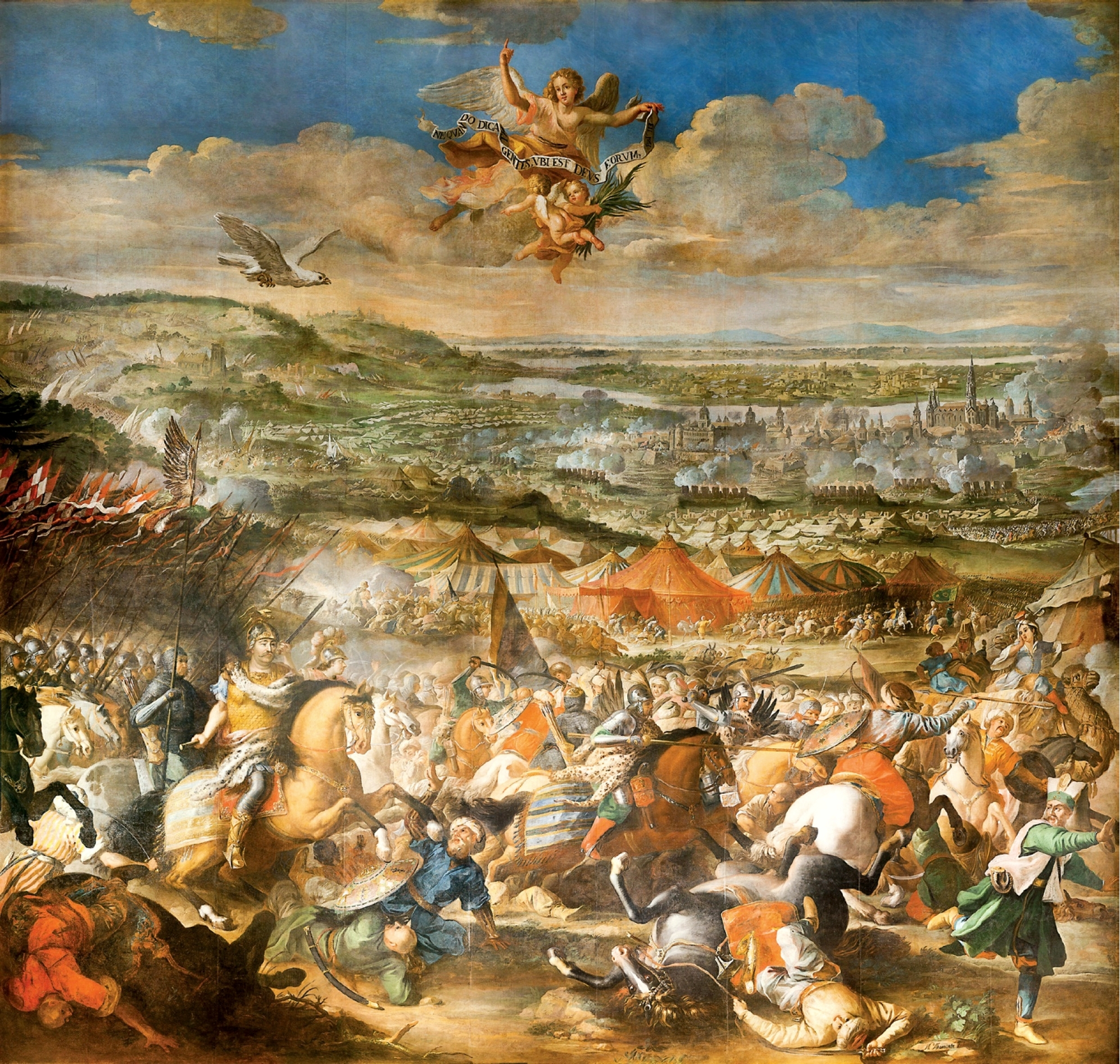
Sobieski defeats the Ottomans at the Battle of Vienna in 1683, by Martino Altomonte

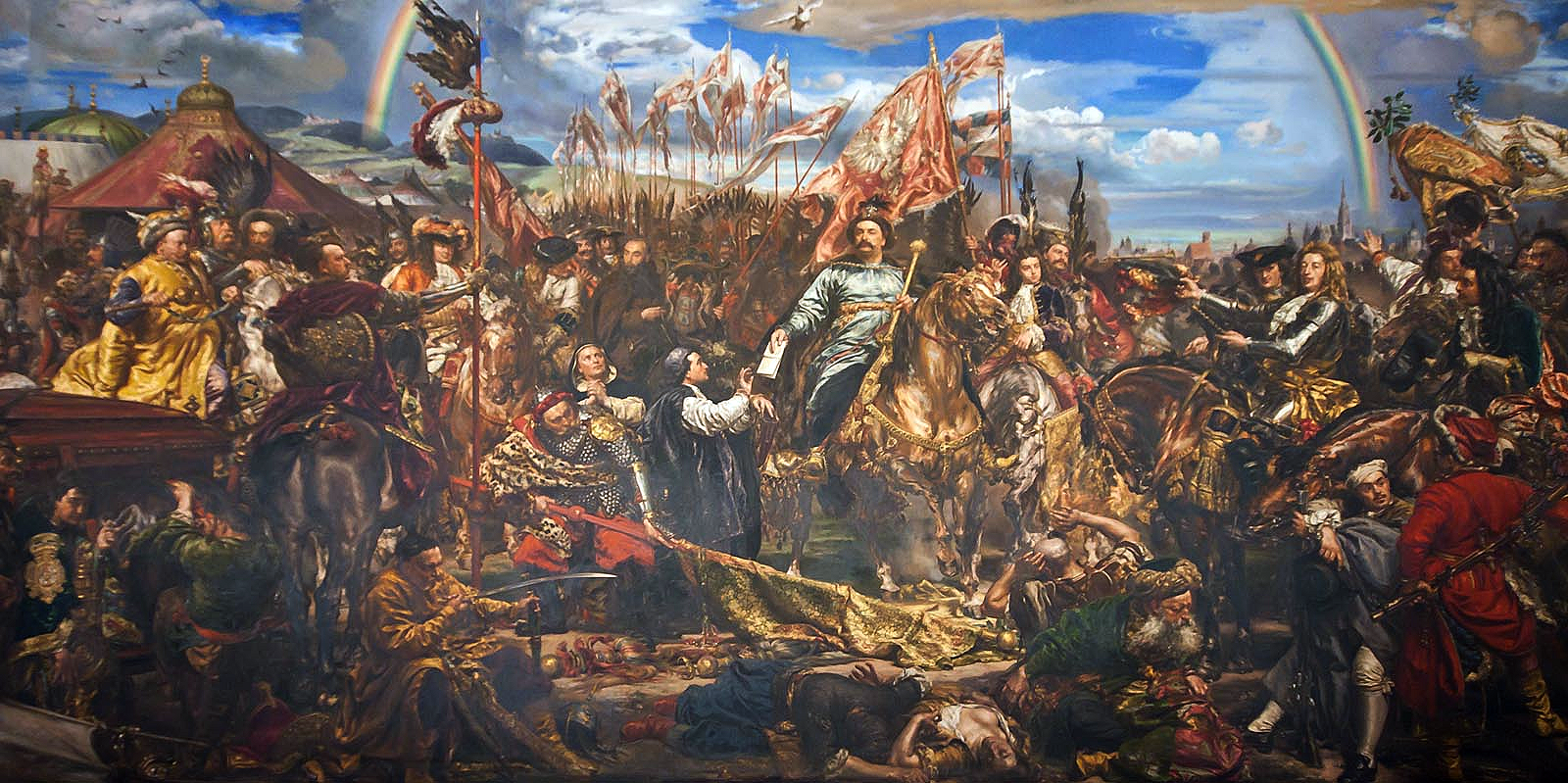
Sobieski sending message of victory to the Pope after the Battle of Vienna, by Jan Matejko, 1880, Vatican Museums

Sobieski's greatest success came in 1683, with his victory at the Battle of Vienna, in joint command of Polish, Austrian and German troops, against the invading Ottomans under Kara Mustafa. Upon reaching Vienna on 12 September, with the Ottoman Army close to breaching the walls, Sobieski ordered a full attack. In the early morning, the united army of about 65,000–76,000 men (including 22,000,–27,000 Poles) attacked a Turkish force of about 143,000 men. At about 5:00 pm, after observing the infantry battle from the Kahlenberg hilltop, Sobieski led the Polish husaria cavalry along with Austrians and Germans in a massive charge down the hillside. Soon, the Ottoman battle line was broken and the Ottoman forces scattered in disarray. At 5:30 pm, Sobieski entered the deserted tent of Kara Mustafa Pasha and the Battle of Vienna ended.

The Pope and other foreign dignitaries hailed Sobieski as the "Savior of Vienna and Western European civilisation." In a letter to his wife, he wrote, "All the common people kissed my hands, my feet, my clothes; others only touched me, saying: "Ah, let us kiss so valiant a hand!"

The war against the Ottomans was not yet over, and Sobieski continued the campaign with the Battle of Párkány on 7–9 October. After early victories, the Poles found themselves a junior partner in the Holy League, gaining no lasting territorial or political rewards. The prolonged and indecisive war also weakened Sobieski's position at home. For the next four years, Poland would blockade the key fortress at Kamenets, and Ottoman Tatars would raid the borderlands. In 1691, Sobieski undertook another expedition to Moldavia, with slightly better results, but still with no decisive victories.

=== Later years and death ===
Although the King spent much time on the battlefields, which could suggest a good state of health, towards the end of his life he became seriously and increasingly ill.

King John III Sobieski died in Wilanów, Poland on 17 June 1696 from a sudden heart attack. His wife, Marie Casimire d'Arquien, died in 1716 in Blois, France, and her body was returned to Poland. They are interred together in Wawel Cathedral, Kraków, although his heart is interred separately in the Church of the Transfiguration in Warsaw, Poland. He was succeeded by Augustus II the Strong.

== Legacy and significance ==
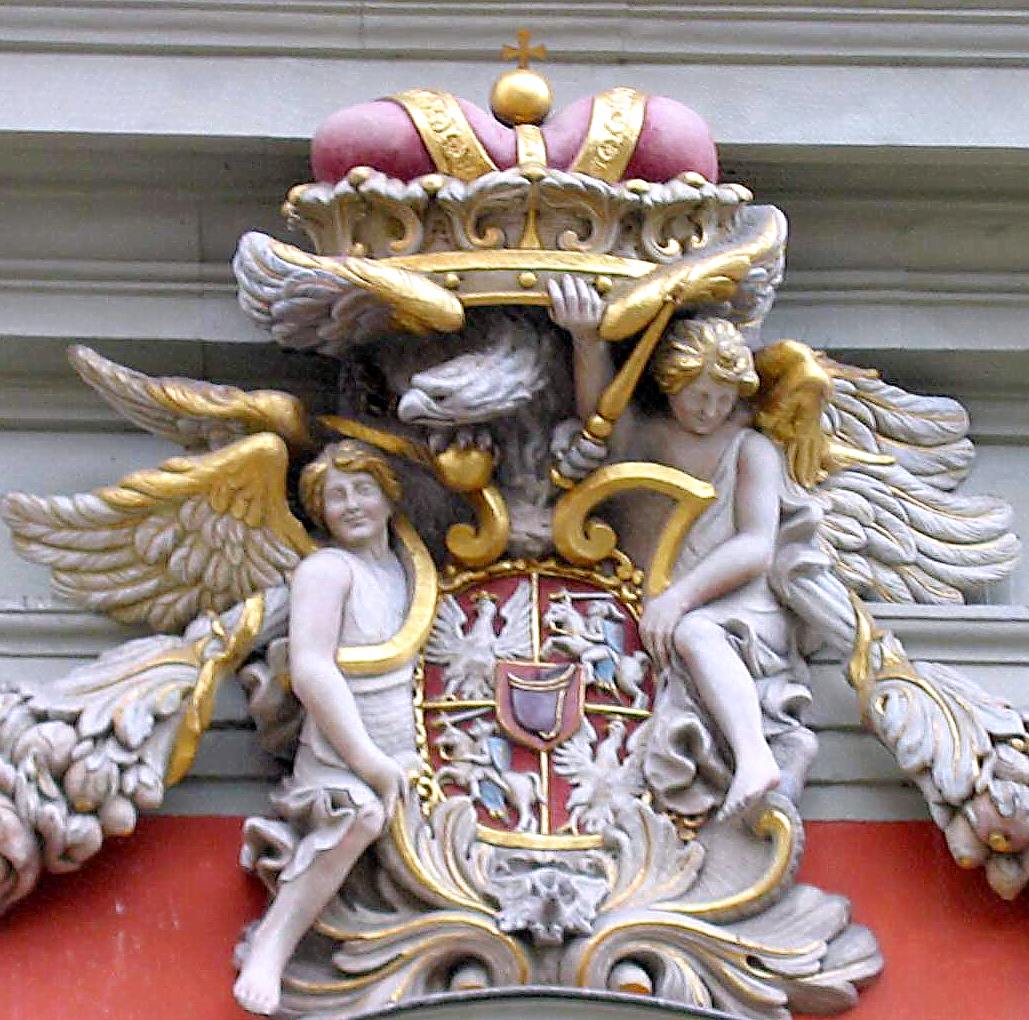
Portrayal of Sobieski's royal crown, Gdańsk

Sobieski is remembered in Poland as a "hero king", victor at Vienna who defeated the Ottoman threat, an image that became particularly well recognised after his story was told in many works of 19th century literature. In the Polish Biographical Dictionary he is described as "an individual above his contemporaries, but still one of them"; an oligarch and a magnate, interested in personal wealth and power. His ambitions for the most part were instilled in him by his beloved wife, whom he undoubtedly loved more than any throne (when forced to divorce her and marry the former Queen as a condition to gain the throne, he immediately refused the throne) and tended to obey, at times blindly.

He failed to reform the ailing Commonwealth and to secure the throne for his heir. At the same time, he displayed high military prowess, he was well educated and literate, and a patron of science and arts. He supported the astronomer Johannes Hevelius, mathematician Adam Adamandy Kochański and the historian and poet Wespazjan Kochowski. His Wilanów Palace became the first of many palaces that would dot the lands of the Commonwealth over the next two centuries.

In 2024, the city of Vienna rejected a monument to King Jan Sobieski due to concerns about Islamophobia and anti-Turkish sentiment.

=== Gallery ===
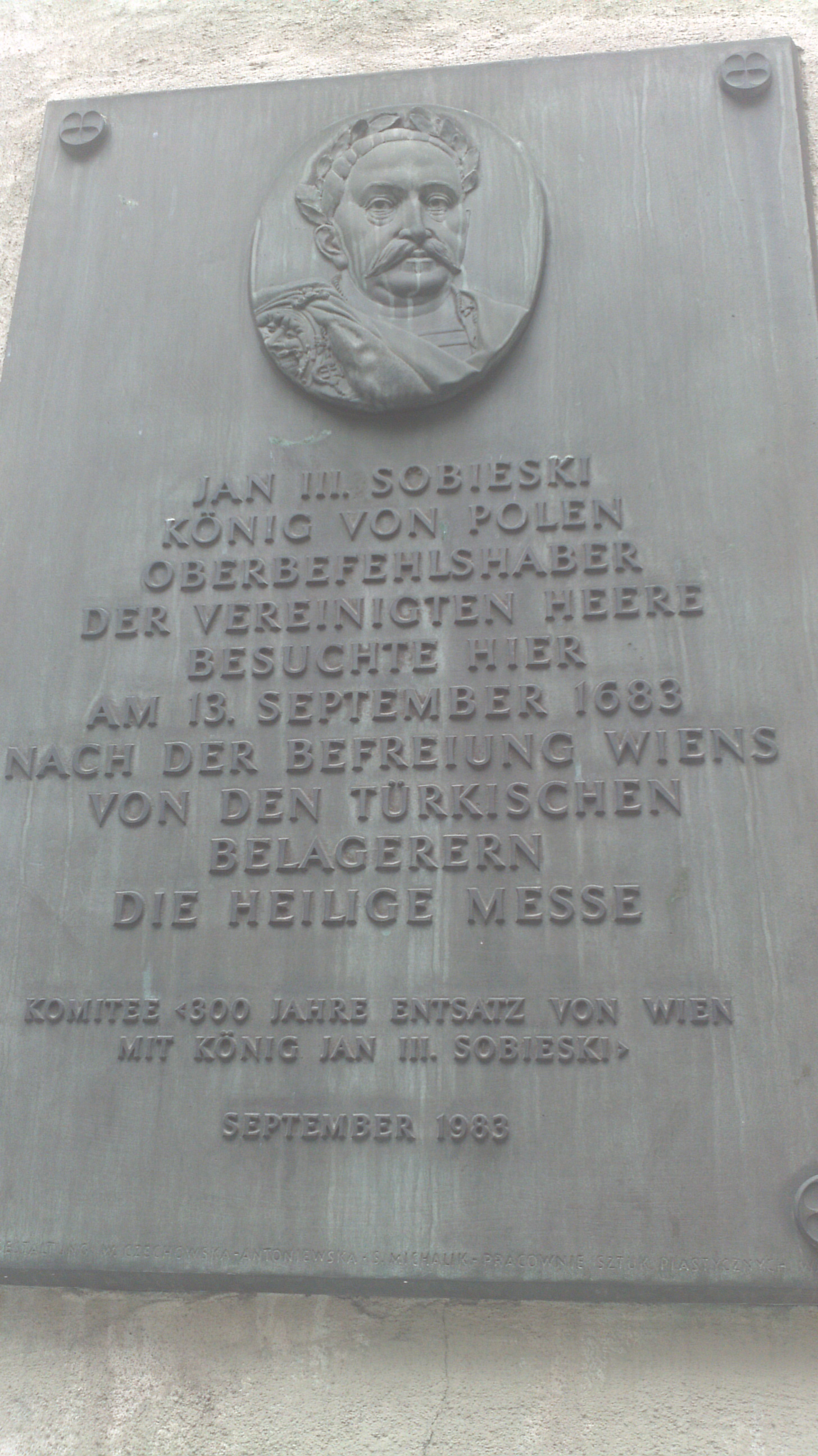
Commemorative plaque featuring Sobieski, Vienna

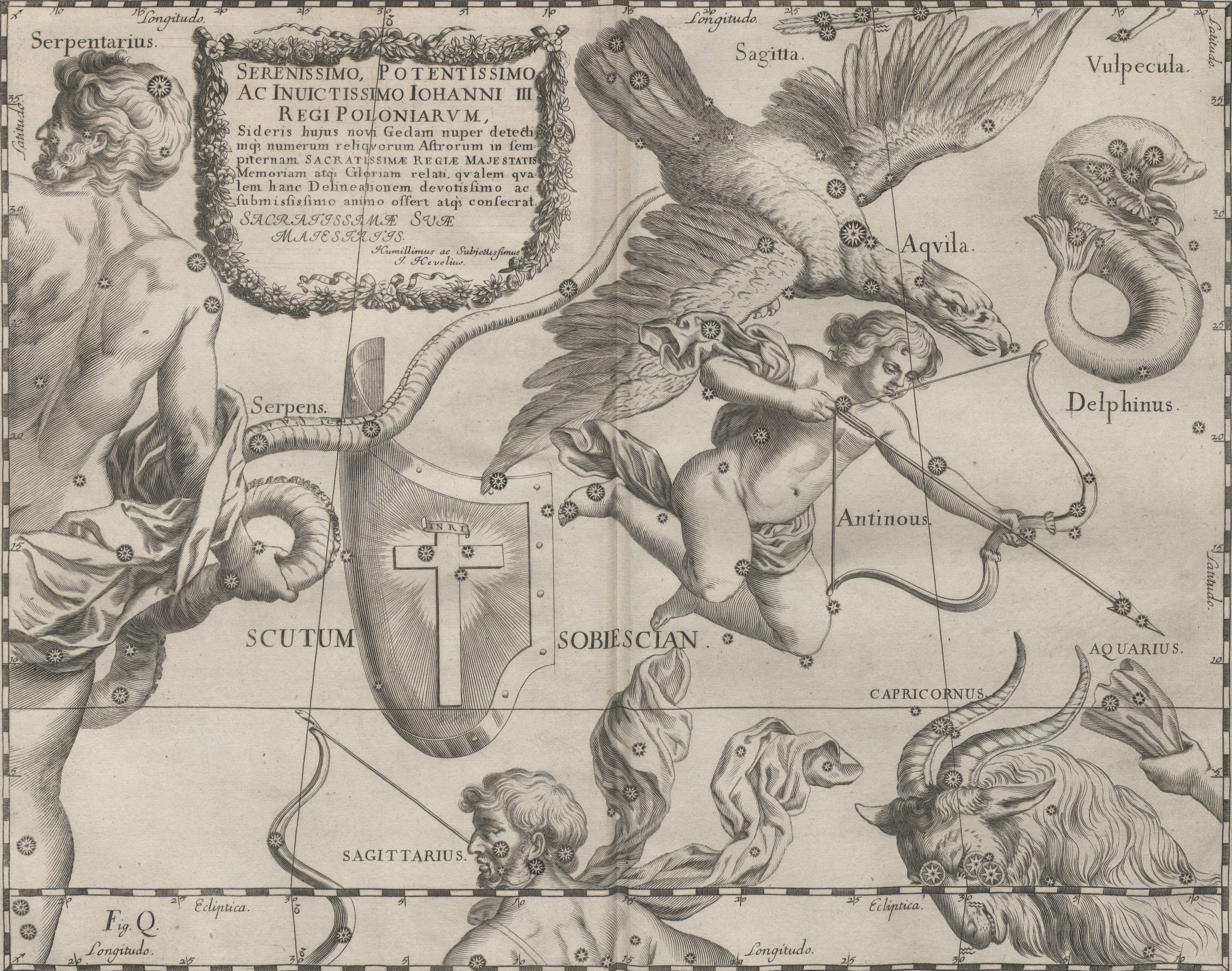
Scutum Sobiescianum – Shield of Sobieski on the sky, by Johannes Hevelius, 1690

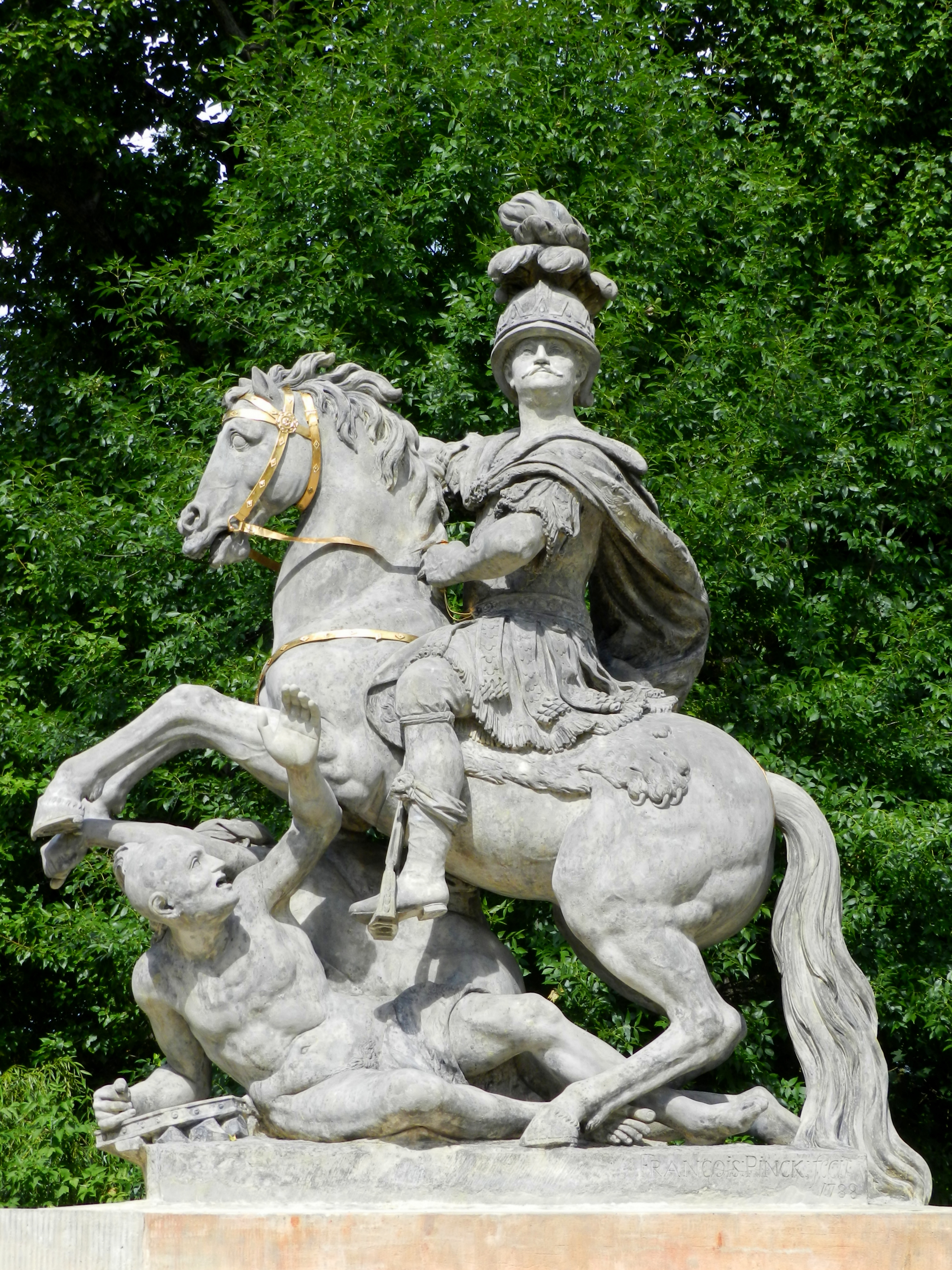
Monument of Sobieski in Łazienki Park, Warsaw

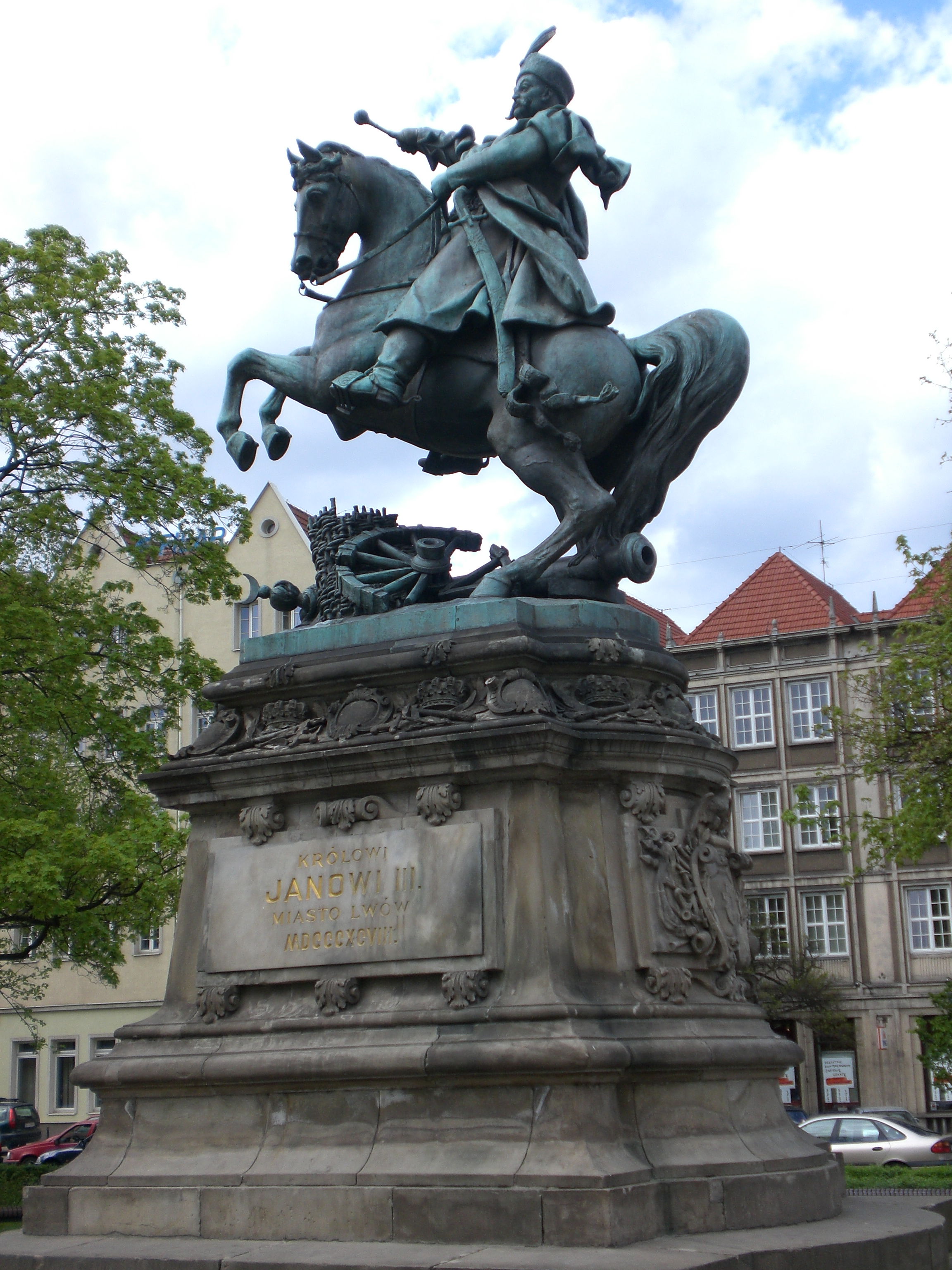
King John III Sobieski Monument (Gdańsk), moved from Lviv after World War II

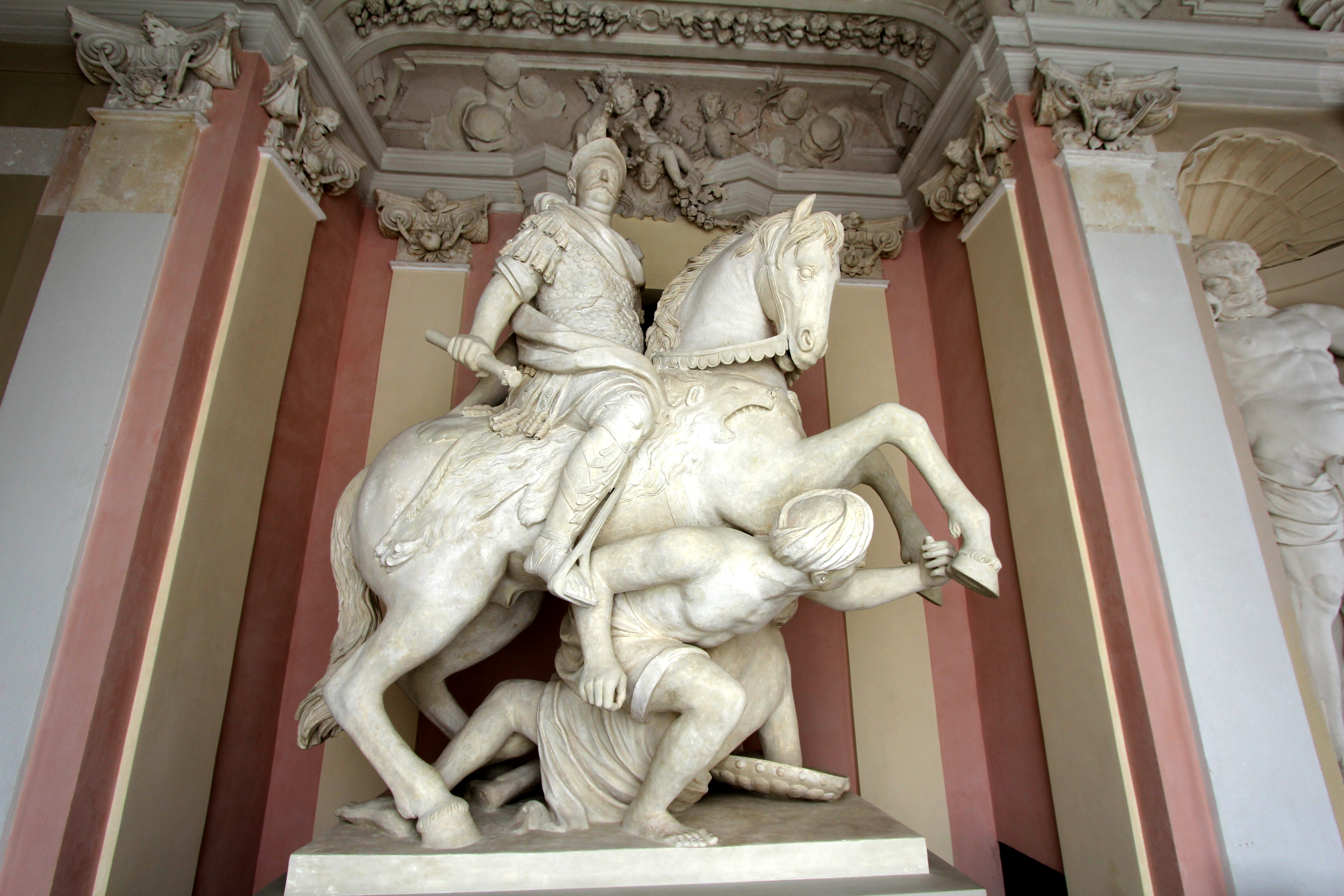
Equestrian monument of King John III inside Wilanów Palace

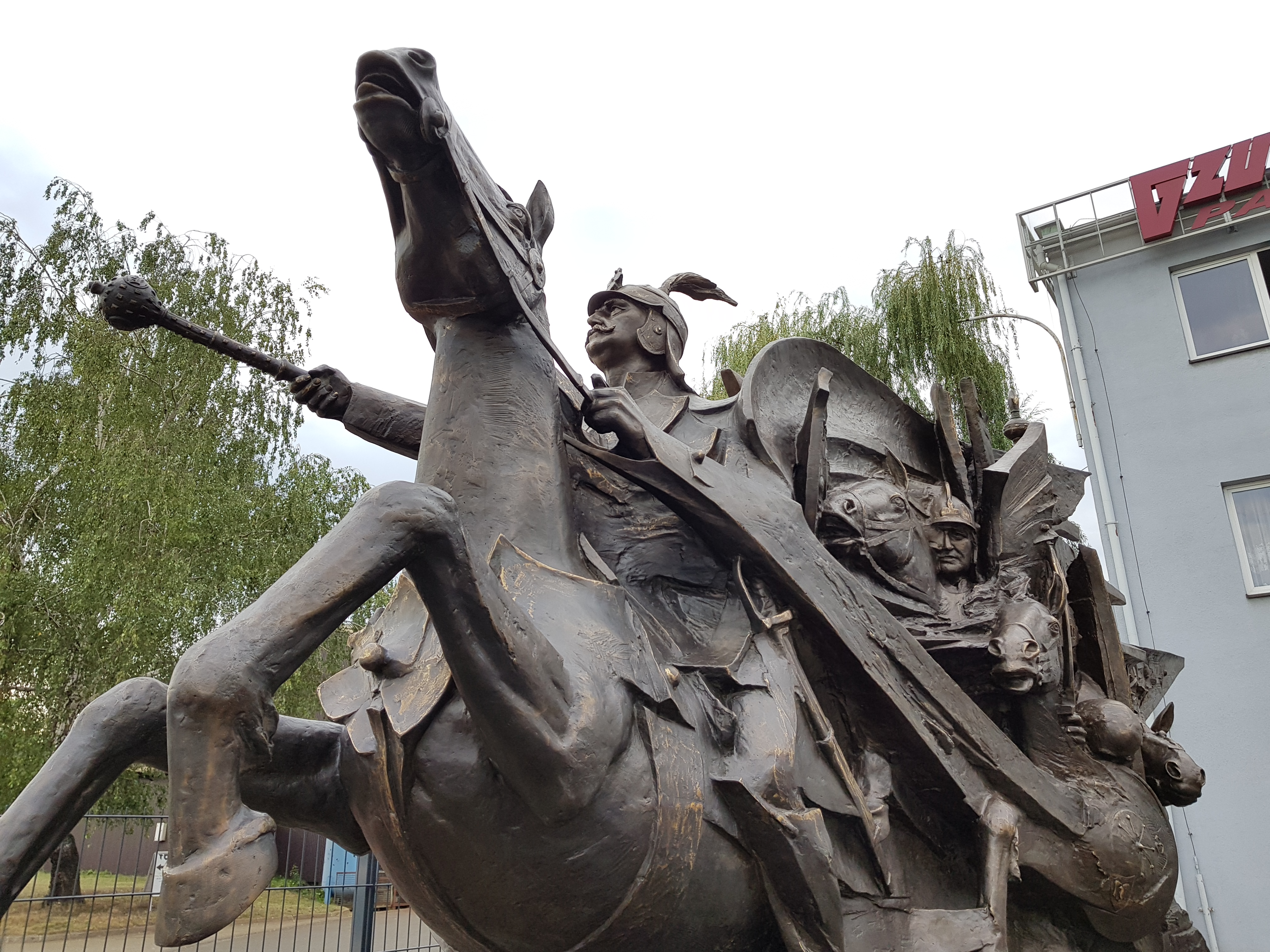
Monument of Sobieski in Poland, by Czesław Dźwigaj

== Family ==
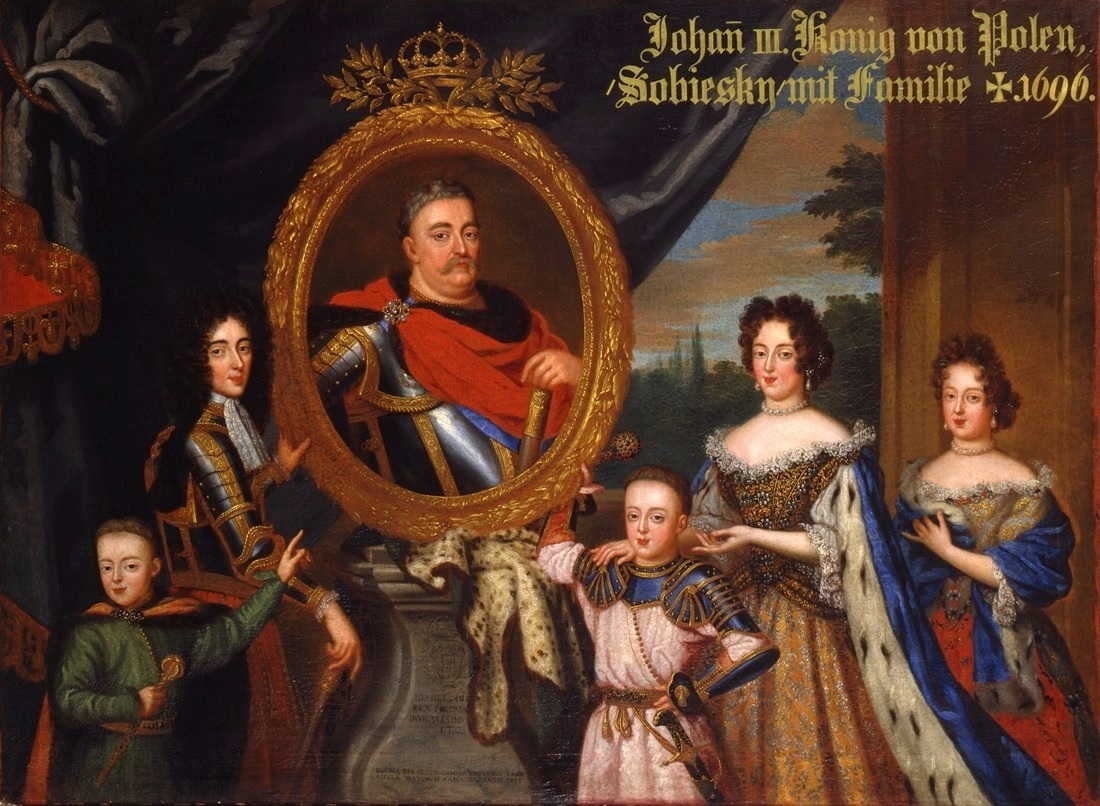
Sobieski and his family by Henri Gascar

On 5 July 1665, he married the widow of Jan Zamoyski, Marie Casimire d'Arquien (1641–1716), of Nevers, Burgundy, France. Their children were:

- Jakub Ludwik Sobieski (2 November 1667 – 19 December 1737), married Countess Palatine Hedwig Elisabeth of Neuburg and had issue, including Maria Clementina Sobieska, mother of Charles Edward Stuart;
- Twin daughters (9 May 1669), stillborn or died shortly after birth;
- Teresa Teofila (October 1670);
- Adelajda Ludwika (15 October 1672 – 10 February 1677), called "Barbelune";
- Maria Teresa (18 October 1673 – 7 December 1675), called "La Mannone";
- Daughter (October 1674), stillborn or died shortly after birth;
- Teresa Kunegunda (4 March 1676 – 10 March 1730), married Maximilian II Emanuel, Elector of Bavaria, and had issue, including Charles VII, Holy Roman Emperor;
- Aleksander Benedykt (6 September 1677 – 19 November 1714), died unmarried;
- Daughter (13 November 1678), stillborn or died shortly after birth;
- Konstanty Władysław (1 May 1680 – 28 February 1726), married Maria Józefa Wessel but had no issue;
- Jan (4 June 1683 – 1 January/12 April 1685);
- Daughter (20 December 1684), stillborn or died shortly after birth.

== Royal titles ==
- Official title (in Latin): Ioannes III, Dei Gratia rex Poloniae, magnus dux Lithuaniae, Russiae, Prussiae, Masoviae, Samogitiae, Livoniae, Smolensciae, Kijoviae, Volhyniae, Podlachiae, Severiae, Czernichoviaeque, etc.
- Official title (in Polish): Jan III, z łaski Bożej, król Polski, wielki książę litewski, ruski, pruski, mazowiecki, żmudzki, kijowski, wołyński, podlaski i czernichowski, etc.
- English translation: John III, by the grace of God King of Poland, Grand Duke of Lithuania, Ruthenia, Prussia, Masovia, Samogitia, Livonia, Smolensk, Kyiv, Volhynia, Podlasie, Severia, and Chernihiv, etc.

== Literary references ==
- Vincenzo da Filicaja (1642–1707) wrote a collection of odes or canzoni about the raising of the siege of Vienna by King John III Sobieski titled "Canzoni in occasione dell'assedio, e liberazione di Vienna," published by Piero Matini in Florence in 1684.
- the first known book review journal Nouvelles de la république des lettres (News from the Republic of Letters), edited and largely written by the Protestant philosopher Pierre Bayle, included a number of works about King Sobieski's victory in its 1st volume: an address to the King (pp. 179–180), Motet Dramatique ou Oratoire (pp. 181–182), Parallèle de Jules Cesar et du Roi de Pologne ("Venit, vidit, vicit..." (pp. 183–185)
- William Wordsworth wrote on 4 February 1816, and published the same year among the "Sonnets dedicated to Liberty" (or "Poems dedicated to Independence and Liberty") his "Siege of Vienna Raised by John Sobieski", which was his take on da Falicaia's ode to Sobieski's victory, about which Wordsworth wrote, "This, and his other poems on the same occasion [of Sobieski's raising the siege of Vienna], are superior perhaps to any lyrical pieces that contemporary events have ever given birth to, those of the Hebrew Scriptures only excepted. - W. W. (1816 and 1820)"
- Jan Gawiński wrote the poem Clipaeus christianitatis (The shield of Christianity), in praise of Sobieski's defeating the Ottoman Empire.

== See also ==
- History of Poland (1569–1795)
- Wilanów Palace
- List of Poles
- List of Polish monarchs
- Scutum Sobieski

== Bibliography ==
- Tindal Palmer, Alicia (1815), Authentic memoirs of John Sobieski, King of Poland, Printed for the author and sold by Longman
- Red. (Eds.) (1962–1964). "Jan III Sobieski". Polski Słownik Biograficzny (in Polish). Vol. X.

John III Sobieski Sobieski Born: 17 August 1629 Died: 17 June 1696
Regnal titles
Vacant Title last held by Michael I	King of Poland; Grand Duke of Lithuania; 1674 – 1696	Vacant Title next held by Augustus II the Strong
Political offices
Vacant Title last held by Stefan Czarniecki	Field Crown Hetman of Poland; 1666 – 1667	Succeeded by Dymitr Jerzy Wiśniowiecki
Vacant Title last held by Stanisław Rewera Potocki	Great Crown Hetman of Poland; 1667 – 1674	Succeeded by Dymitr Jerzy Wiśniowiecki
Preceded by Jerzy Sebastian Lubomirski	Great Marshal of the Crown of Poland; 1667 – 1674	Succeeded by Stanisław Herakliusz Lubomirski
