= Małgorzata Kotowska =

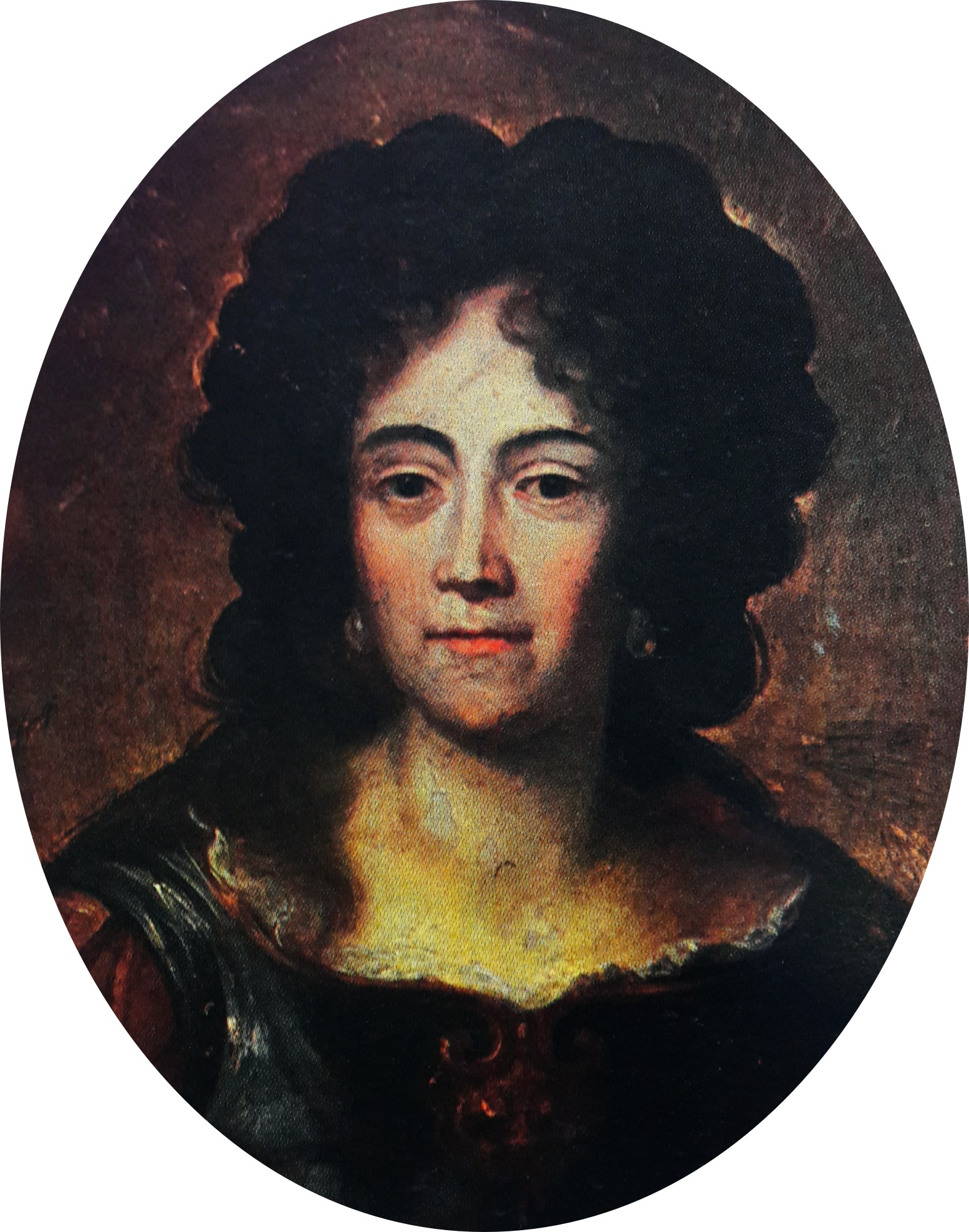
Warsaw Małgorzata Kotowska

Małgorzata Kotowska also known as Małgorzata Durantówna (died 1690) was a Polish lady-in-waiting, and an unofficial diplomatic emissary.

Małgorzata Kotowska was born to a French tailor in France as Marguerite Durant. The family emigrated to Warsaw in Poland during her childhood. In 1659, she married Adam Kotowski, a court official who was ennobled in 1673. At the royal Polish court, she made the acquaintance of the new French Queen of Poland, Marie Casimire Louise de La Grange d'Arquien, who had several French favorites, and who appointed her lady-in-waiting. She became the trusted confidante of the queen, who was heavily active in state affairs through her influence on her husband the king.

In 1679, Queen Marie Casimire sent her as her informal political ambassador to the emperor to find out the view of the emperor concerning an alliance between the emperor and Poland against Turkey. After her visit to the emperor, Małgorzata Kotowska continued to the court of Cosimo III de' Medici in Florence, and finally to the Republic of Venice on the same diplomatic mission.

In Warsaw, Małgorzata Kotowska held receptions for the foreign diplomats in her residence, and acted as the go-between and an informer of the queen. Her important and influential position was widely acknowledged. She was described as pious and discreet.
