= Maria Józefa Sobieska =

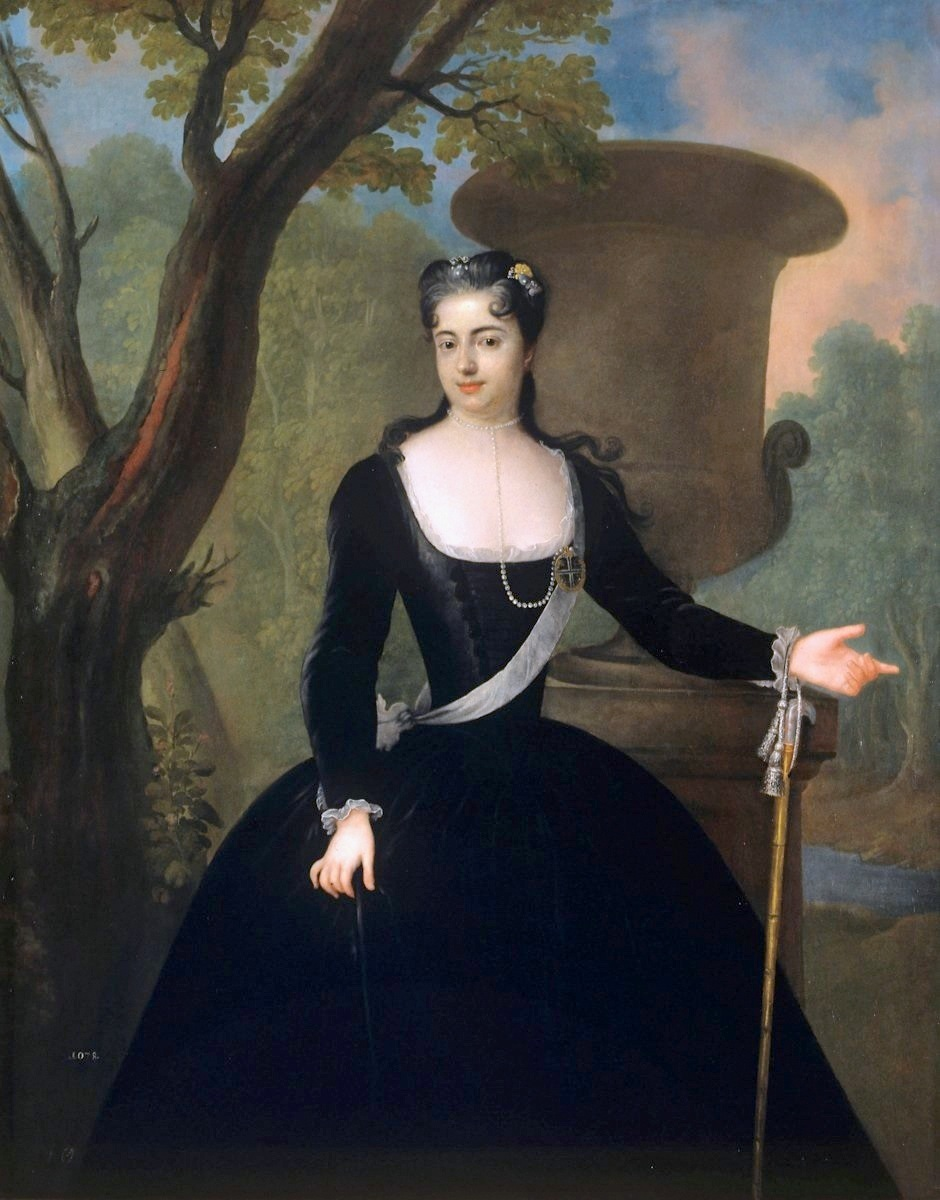
Maria Józefa Sobieska

Maria Józefa Sobieska née Wessel (1685–1761) was a Polish princess, daughter-in-law of king John III Sobieski.

== Biography ==
She was the daughter of nobleman Stanisław Wessel, Rogala coat of arms and Countess Maria Barbara von Starhemberg (1673–1745). Maria Barbara had been the royal governess of Princess Theresa Kunegunda Sobieska (1676–1730), one of the daughters of John III Sobieski. After becoming a widow early, her mother married in 1692 Austrian Feldmarschall Count Johann Heinrich von Dünewald-Pixendorf who died just a year later in 1693 and she later married again Count Maximilian Siegmund Friedrich von Trauttmansdorff-Weinsberg (1674–1731).

Most likely, from 1702 Maria Józefa was in Oława at the court of her future husband's brother, James Louis Sobieski. On 18 November 1708, in Gdańsk, she married Konstanty Władysław Sobieski, one of the sons of John III. This marriage was not well received, especially by Konstanty's mother, the dowager Queen Marie Kazimiera. Soon after the marriage, Konstanty Władysław left Poland, leaving his wife behind, and in 1711 he took the first steps towards obtaining a divorce. At first, Maria Józefa did not refuse to go along with this, but she wanted to agree on favorable terms. Until May 1719, Maria Józefa lived at the Convent of the Holy Sacraments in Warsaw, intending to remain there for the duration of the divorce proceedings. In 1720, Konstanty bought her a town house in Warsaw from the courtier Franciszek Manteuffel-Kiełpiński. In 1724 the ongoing divorce proceedings finally confirmed that the marriage had been lawful, and in November 1725 the terms of a settlement were agreed. It has been claimed that at the end of that year, Maria Józefa gave birth to a stillborn son, but this is considered unlikely. On 22 July 1726 Konstanty Władysław died, and Maria Józefa became his widow.

In the spring of 1727, Maria Józefa entered into a contract with her brother-in-law James Louis Sobieski under which, for the next year and a half, she was to manage the Prince Konstanty's estates in Żółkiew, now Zhovkva in Ukraine, Pomorzany, and Tarnopol. In January 1729, Maria Józefa left Zhovkva to live in Lwów, also now in Ukraine, and from there she moved on to Pilica, Upper Silesia, where she bought a castle and thirteen neighboring villages. Between 1731 and 1740, she rebuilt the castle to serve as her main residence. She also founded a Franciscan monastery in Pilica, the Minor Friars of Strict Observance.

In 1753, Maria Józefa sold her estates to a nephew, Teodor Wessel, and returned to living in the Convent of the Holy Sacraments at Warsaw. On 4 January 1761, she died there of breast cancer, leaving her remaining property to nephews and nieces. Her funeral was on 7 January 1761 at the church of Saint Casimir in the New Town, where her tomb could still be visited until the destruction caused during the Warsaw Uprising of 1944.
