= Marie Casimire d'Arquien =

Queen of Poland from 1674 to 1696

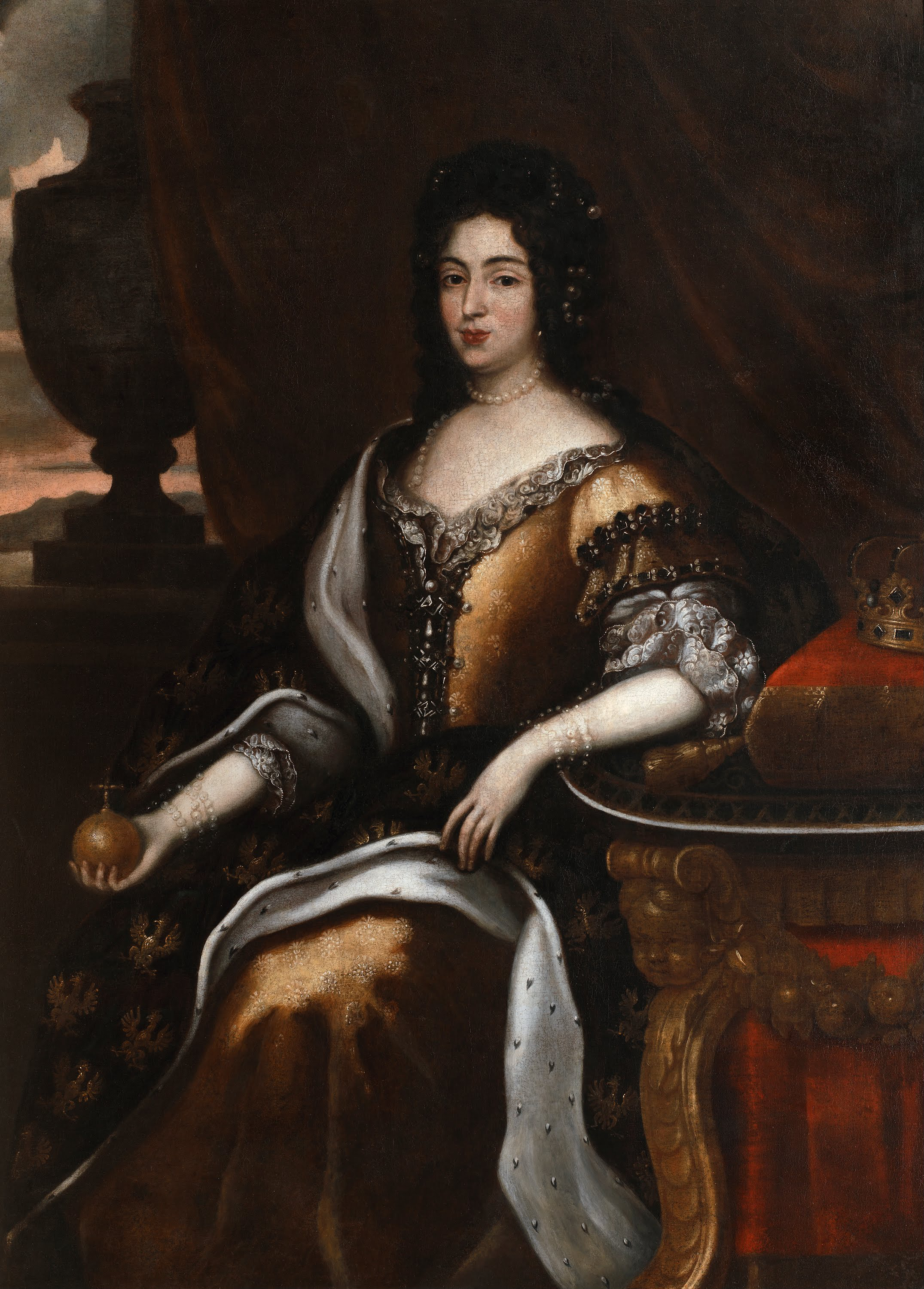
- Ceremonial portrait of Queen Marie Casimire painted after her coronation in 1676 (Note: Due to the similarity of Marie Casimire's facial features to her image in the "Dawn" plafond (Mirror Study in the Wilanów palace), attributed to Jan Reisner, some scholars assume that it might have been painted in the early 1680s, before the Battle of Vienna.)

Queen consort of Poland Grand Duchess consort of Lithuania
- Tenure: 1674–1696
- Coronation: 2 February 1676
- Born: 28 June 1641; Nevers, France
- Died: 30 January 1716 (aged 74); Blois, France
- Spouses: John Zamoyski (m. 1658; died 1665) John III Sobieski (m. 1665; died 1696)
- Issue among others...: James, Duke of Olawa; Princess Theresa; Prince Aleksander; Prince Konstanty
- Father: Henri de la Grange d'Arquien
- Mother: Françoise de la Châtre (Note: her real mother was rumored to be Marie Louise Gonzaga)
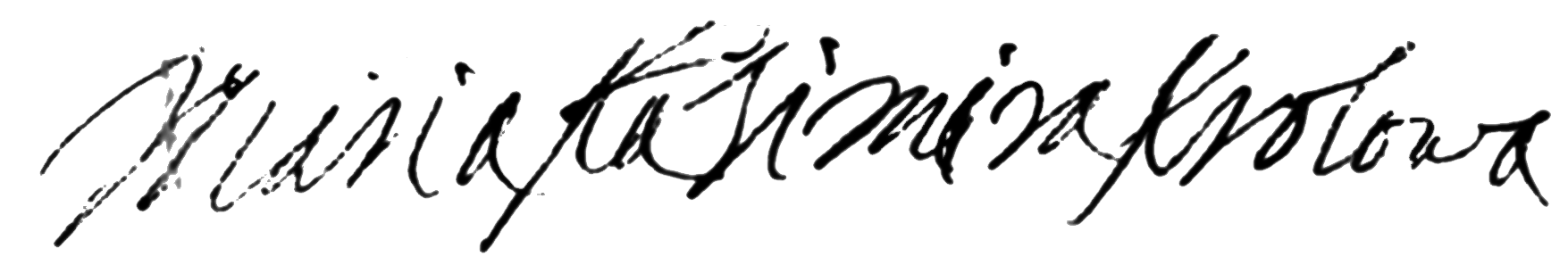
- Signature

Marie Casimire Louise de La Grange d'Arquien (Polish: Maria Kazimiera Ludwika d’Arquien, Lithuanian: Marija Kazimiera; 28 June 1641 – 30 January 1716), known also by the diminutive form "Marysieńka", was a French noblewoman who became the queen consort of Poland and Grand Duchess consort of Lithuania from 1674 to 1696 by her marriage to King and Grand Duke John III Sobieski of the Polish–Lithuanian Commonwealth. She had great influence upon the affairs of state with the approval of her spouse, and acted in effect as regent during his absence.

== Early life ==
Marie Casimire and her sister Louise Marie were the only surviving children of Henri de la Grange, Marquis d'Arquien and his first wife, Françoise de la Chastre (1613–1648). She came to Poland at the age of five years as a lady in waiting to Marie Louise Gonzaga, the French-born Queen of Poland and Grand Duchess of Lithuania from 1645 to 1672, wife and consort to two Polish kings and Lithuanian grand dukes — Władysław IV Vasa and later his brother (who succeeded him) John II Casimir Vasa. Marie Louise was rumored to be Marie Casimire's real mother, although unproven, they certainly had a close relationship. The harsh climate of Poland did not prove healthy for Marie Casimire, and she developed a persistent cough and recurring fever.

At the court, she met and fell in love with Jan Sobieski, who arrived in 1656, but she was first married off to Jan "Sobiepan" Zamoyski in 1658, with whom she had four children, all of whom died in early childhood. Jan Zamoyski died on 2 April 1665 and the widowed Marie Casimire married Jan Sobieski just over three months later, on 14 July of the same year. The couple had thirteen children together, but only four of them reached adulthood — Jakub, Aleksander, Konstanty and Teresa (who later became Kurfürstin of Bavaria and mother to Emperor Karl VII).

== Queen of Poland and Grand Duchess of Lithuania ==
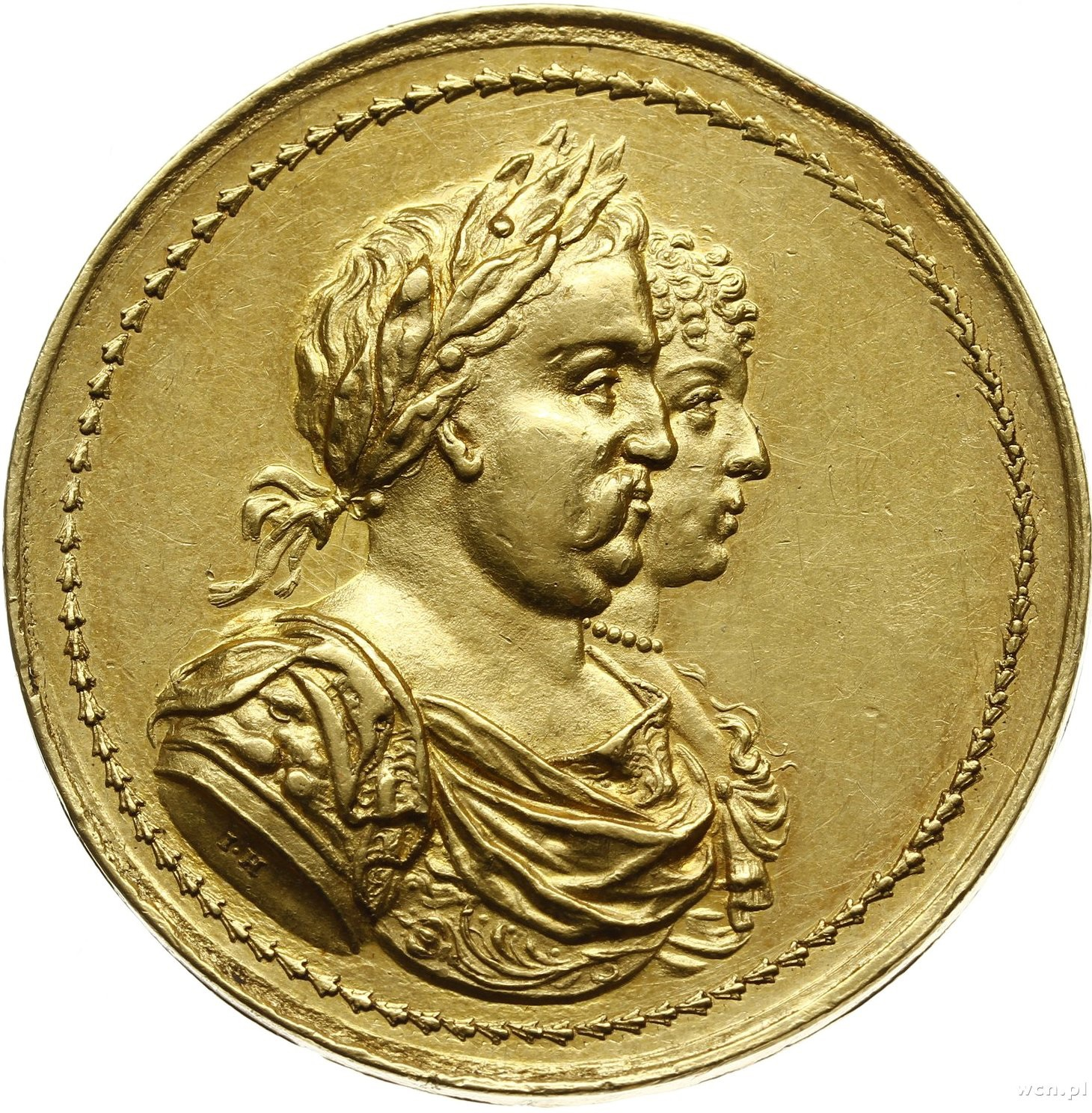
Coronation medal featuring the profiles of John III and Marie Casimire, 1676

John Sobieski was elected King of Poland and Grand Duke of Lithuania in 1674, not without the influence of his wife. As the Queen of Poland and Grand Duchess of Lithuania, Marie Casimire quickly became unpopular, as she supported the proposed Polish–French alliance, while simultaneously striving to gain privileges for her family from the French King Louis XIV, whom she greatly admired. Like Marie Louise Gonzaga, Marie Casimire was a strong supporter of an absolute monarchy, for which she was reviled by certain spheres of the Szlachta. The nobility were scandalised at the queen's political meddling, believing that foreign women shouldn't interfere with politics. Marie Casimire also opposed the Commonwealth's policy of religious toleration and supported the Edict of Fontainebleau of 1685.

Her influence is exemplified in an incident in 1678, when the Chancellor of Nowogrod, Mikołaj Władysław Przeździecki, came to the king as the leader of an unofficial delegation to present him with evidence that the Pac family were his enemies. According to Mikolaj Wladyslaw Prze Dziecki, "The Queen knocked on the doors until the King asked for them to be opened and then took the monarch by the hand, leading him to the side, with great force, speaking in French", which the Chancellor viewed with disgust.

In the 1670s, the king of France wished to close a treaty between France, Sweden, the Polish-Lithuanian Commonwealth and the Ottoman Empire. The French ambassador recommended working with Marie Casimire since "only the Queen Consort of Poland can convince the King, her husband, to close a treaty".

Queen Marie Casimire gave her support to this issue, and a secret treaty was signed in Jaworowo on 11 June 1675, and completed by a treaty between Poland and Sweden in 1677.

Her Pro-French policies were, however, discontinued in 1678, when France had not fulfilled the terms promised her for her services, such as making her father a Peer of France, combined with the fact that Marie Casimire became more concerned with the threat of the Turks.

Queen Marie Casimire sent her lady-in-waiting and confidante Malgorzata Korowska as her political agent to the Emperor Leopold I in 1679 to find out his view concerning an alliance between the emperor and Poland against Turkey. On 1 April 1683, Poland signed the military alliance with the emperor, which she had supported.

She also played an important role during the war against Turkey, when she was credited with having convinced her spouse to support the emperor when Vienna was attacked in 1683. The French ambassador Michelle de Mongrillon described her influence when he commented: "She could move her husband first of all, then she moved the huge, lethargic corps of the Commonwealth that is so difficult to set in motion".

Poland and Lithuania joined the Holy League in 1684, an act which had been promoted by Marie Casimire.

When King John Sobieski was absent in Wallachia and Moldova in 1686 and 1691 and at the Battle of Kamenets, Marie Casimire is acknowledged to have ruled in effect as regent in his absence.

As such, she had the authority to negotiate the military and trade treaty with France in September 1692, which restored the relations between Paris, Copenhagen, Stockholm and Warsaw, known as the "Crown of the North Alliance". She worked with the French ambassador Robert Le Roux d'Esenval and his successor Melchior de Polignac to settle unsettled affairs within the Crown of the North Alliance as well as the peace treaty with Turkey.

In 1695, she successfully solved the conflict between the King's supporter, the Bishop of Vilnius, Konstanty Brzostowski, and Kazimierz Jan Sapieha, as she wished to win the Sapieha party to support her son's candidacy as king and grand duke.

Queen Marie Casimire herself commented concerning the great political influence she had during the reign of her spouse in a letter in retrospect:

"I bear the burden of all the matters at hand, as my late husband loved me more than I deserved. Therefore, he did anything that pleased me and that I allowed for, as he considered me smarter than I am".

== Later life ==
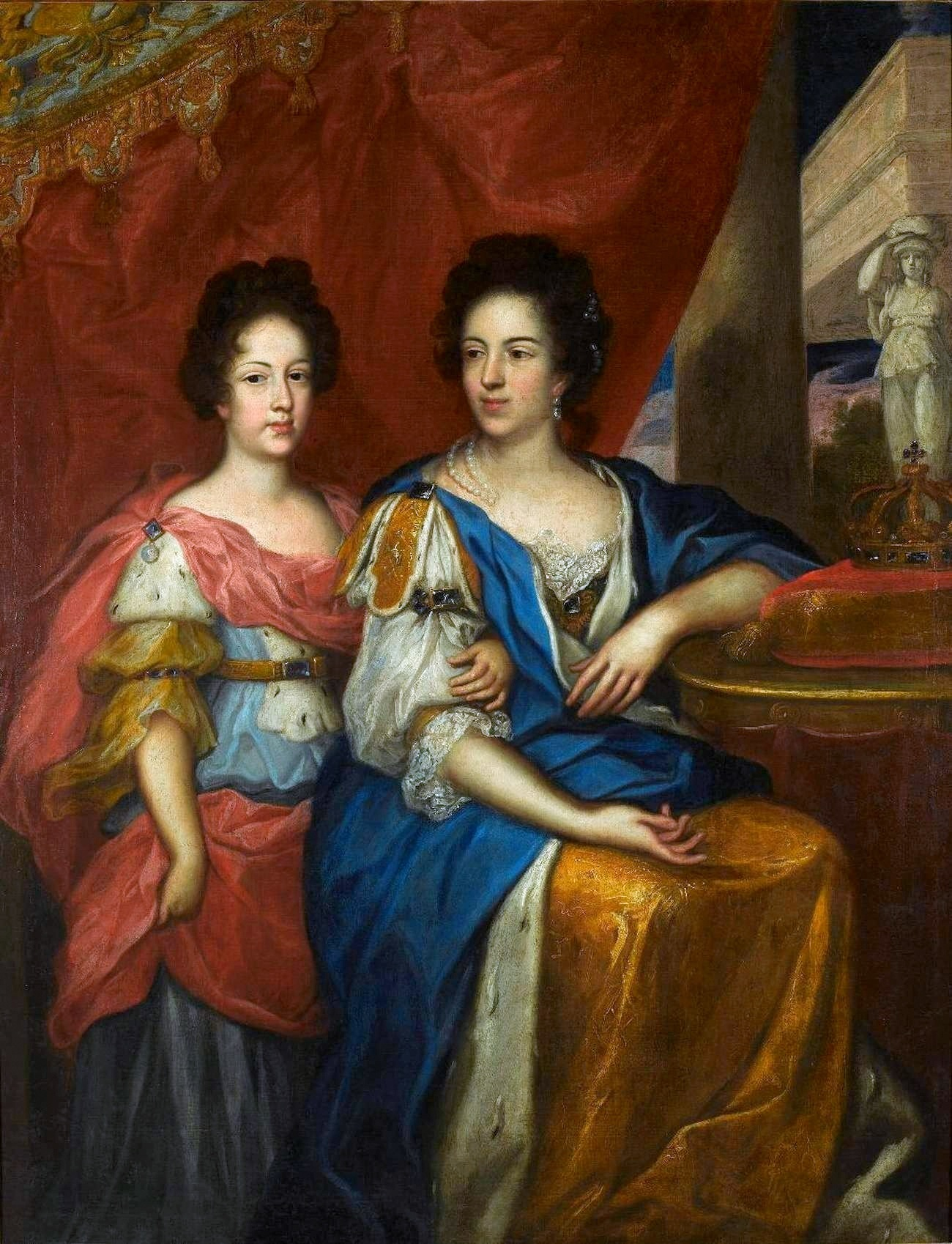
Marie Casimire with her daughter Theresa Kunegunda Sobieska, by Jerzy Siemiginowski-Eleuter, c. 1690

Marie Casimire was described as hard, arrogant, and self-centered. She was widowed in 1696. She remained in Poland for three years. In 1699, she departed for a distinguished exile in Rome.

She expected to be received with the same respect and prestige as Christina, Queen of Sweden, a well-known art patron and founder of the Academy of Arcadia, but Marie Casimire was not considered to possess Queen Christina's virtues, her nobility, nor her intellect. Nevertheless, Marie Casimire was well received and became a music patron who was mainly patronised by Domenico Scarlatti. In his role as maestro di Capella, he composed and produced seven operas with her, as a continuation of the operas written by his father, Alessandro.

Marysieńka spent the last one and a half years of her life in her native France, where in January 1716 she died after a rinsing of the stomach administered by a doctor. The coffin was moved to the chapel of St. Eustace in the church of St. Savior in Blois. On the other hand, the heart was put in a casket in the local Jesuit church (it was later lost during the French Revolution). Then in 1717, the coffin with Marysieńka's body was buried in the Capuchin church in Warsaw, next to John III. In 1733, both bodies were transported to the Wawel Cathedral in Krakow.

== Legacy ==
The royal couple became famous for their love letters, most of which were written from 1665 to 1683, when they were parted either due to John III Sobieski's military engagements or her travels to Paris. The letters give insight not only into the authentic feelings of the loving couple, but also their reflections on contemporary issues and difficulties, as well as down-to-earth matters concerning the royal household and little day-to-day decisions made by the monarch, who often consulted his wife about them. Published long after the death of both of them, they can be credited with popularising the King's way of addressing the Queen by the very diminutive form of her first name — "Marysieńka". She is widely remembered and referred to in Poland that way.

== Issue ==
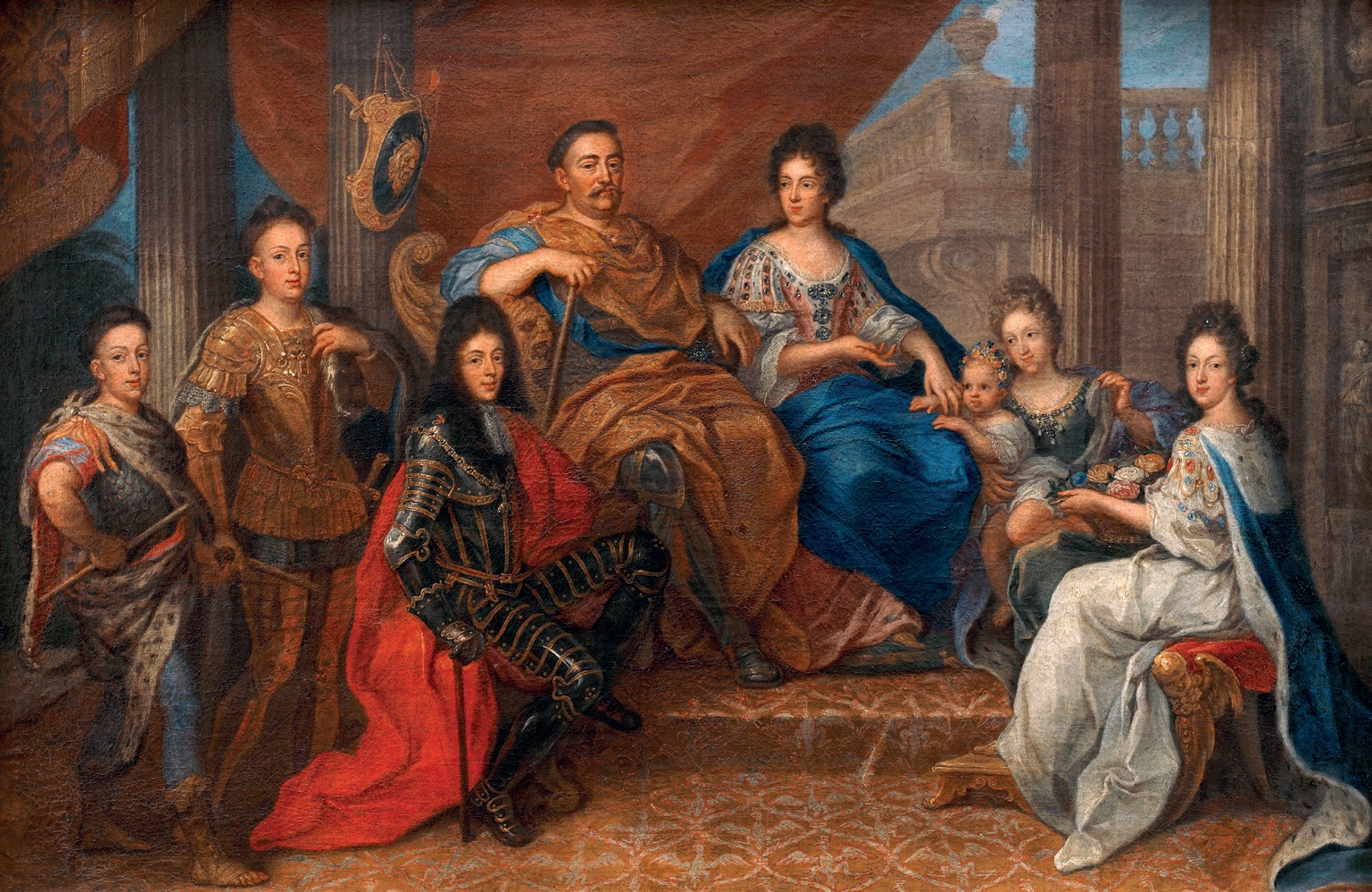
John III Sobieski with his family

Marie Casimire first married Jan "Sobiepan" Zamoyski (1627–1665) on 3 March 1658 in Warsaw. They had four children, all of whom died in early childhood:

- Ludwika Maria (April 1659 – May 1659);
- Son (born and died January 1660);
- Katarzyna Barbara (5 December 1660 – December 1662);
- Daughter (May 1664 – August 1664).

Zamoyski himself died on 2 April 1665. Marie Casimire quickly remarried in July of that year to the future John III Sobieski. This marriage was famously happy, and the couple had thirteen children, nine of whom died in childhood:

- Jakub Ludwik Henryk (2 November 1667 – 19 December 1737), married Countess Palatine Hedwig Elisabeth of Neuburg and had issue;
- Twin Daughters (9 May 1669), stillborn or died shortly after birth;
- Teresa Teofila (October 1670) was a frail child and failed to survive for more than a month. The child was born and died while her mother was in France;
- Adelajda Ludwika (15 October 1672 – 10 February 1677), called "Barbelune", died at the age of four after a long and painful illness;
- Maria Teresa (18 October 1673 – 7 December 1675), called "La Mannone", died at the age of two, less than two months before her parents' coronation. The death of their beloved daughter plunged the royal couple into deep despair, which is expressed in the letters written by the spouses during this period. Marie Casimire wrote in a letter to her husband: "I'm so devastated by worry that I don't think I'll ever recover. May God allow me to forget this." During this time, Marie Casimire was herself ill, suffering from serious coughing, fainting, and fever;
- Daughter (October 1674), stillborn or died shortly after birth;
- Teresa Kunegunda (4 March 1676 – 10 March 1730), married Maximilian II Emanuel, Elector of Bavaria and had issue;
- Aleksander Benedykt (6 September 1677 – 19 November 1714), died unmarried;
- Daughter (13 November 1678), stillborn or died shortly after birth;
- Konstanty Władysław (1 May 1680 – 28 February 1726), married Maria Józefa Wessel but had no issue;
- Jan (4 June 1683 – 1 January/12 April 1685), died at the age of one;
- Daughter (20 December 1684), stillborn or died shortly after birth.

Marie Casimire also had at least one miscarriage at the turn of 1681 and 1682.

== Gallery ==
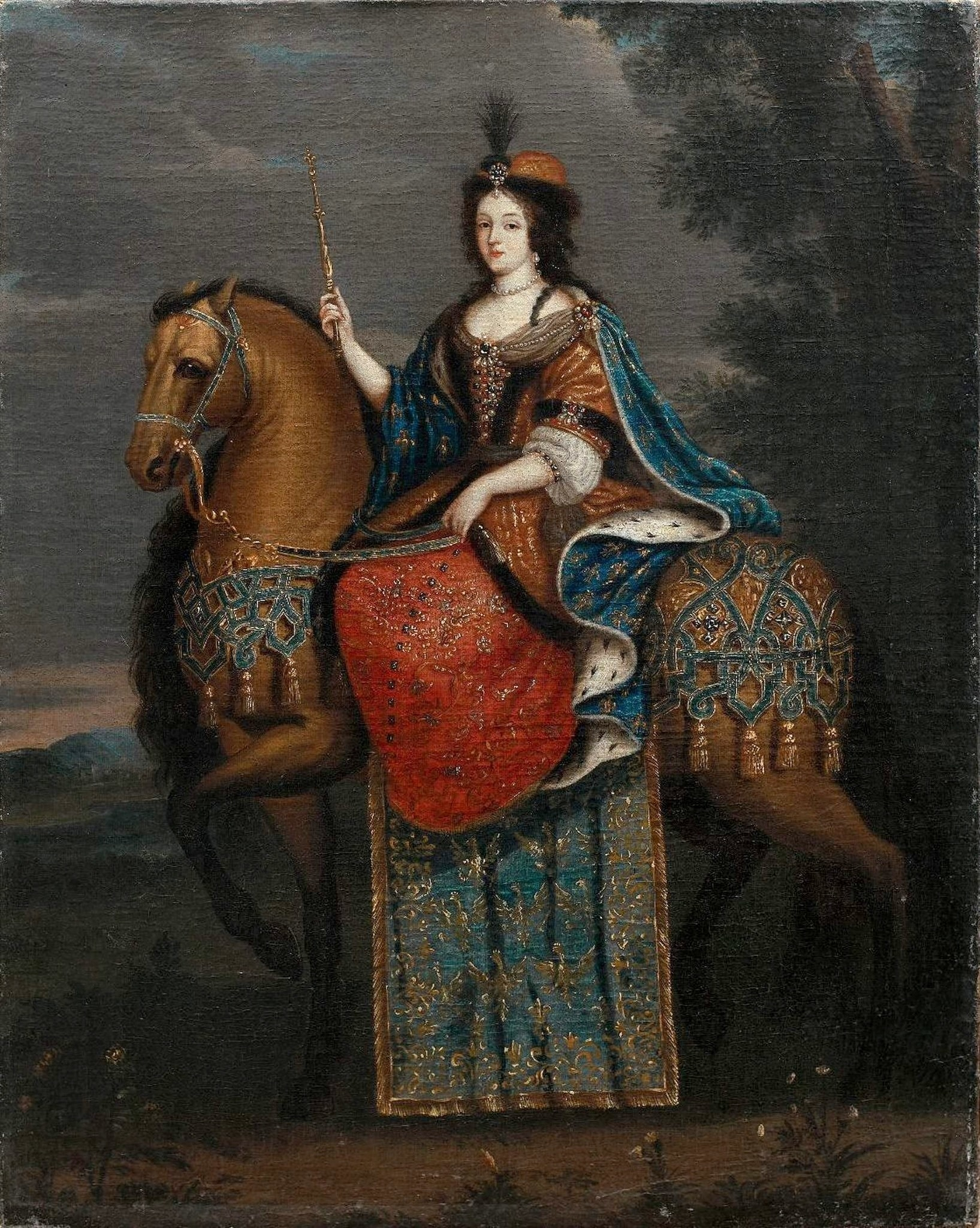
Queen Marie Casimire on horseback

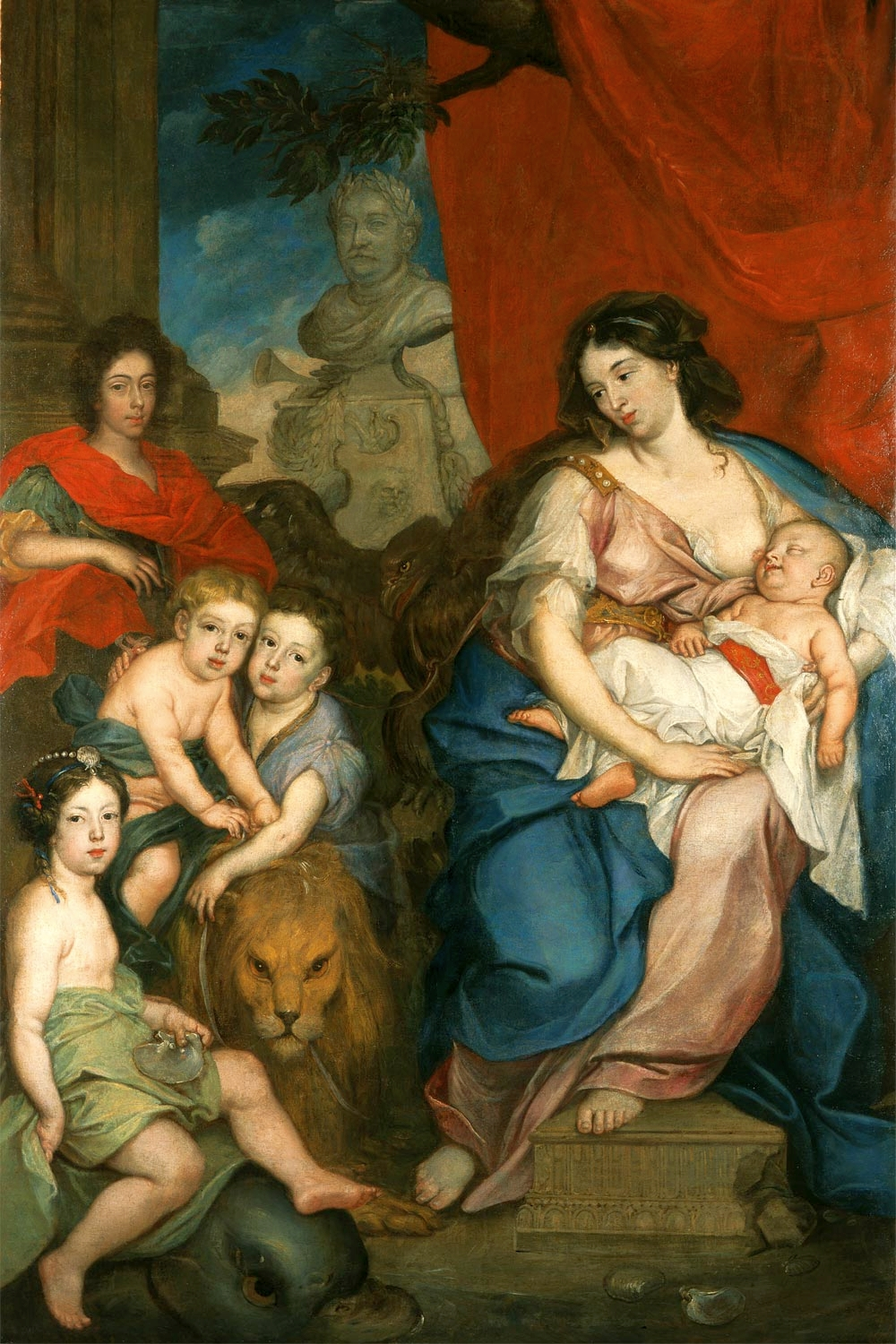
Queen Marie Casimire with Children

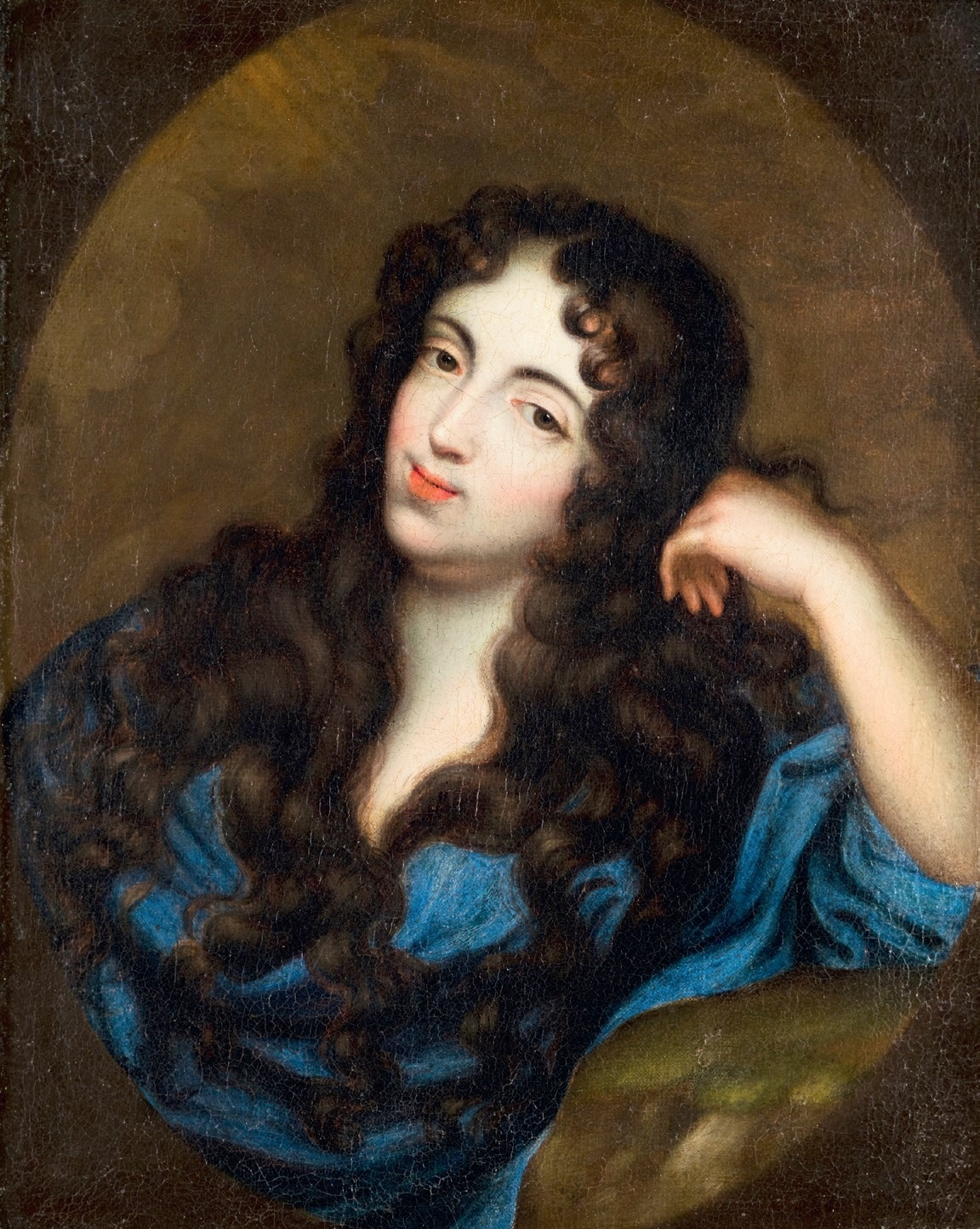
Marysieńka as the penitent Magdalene

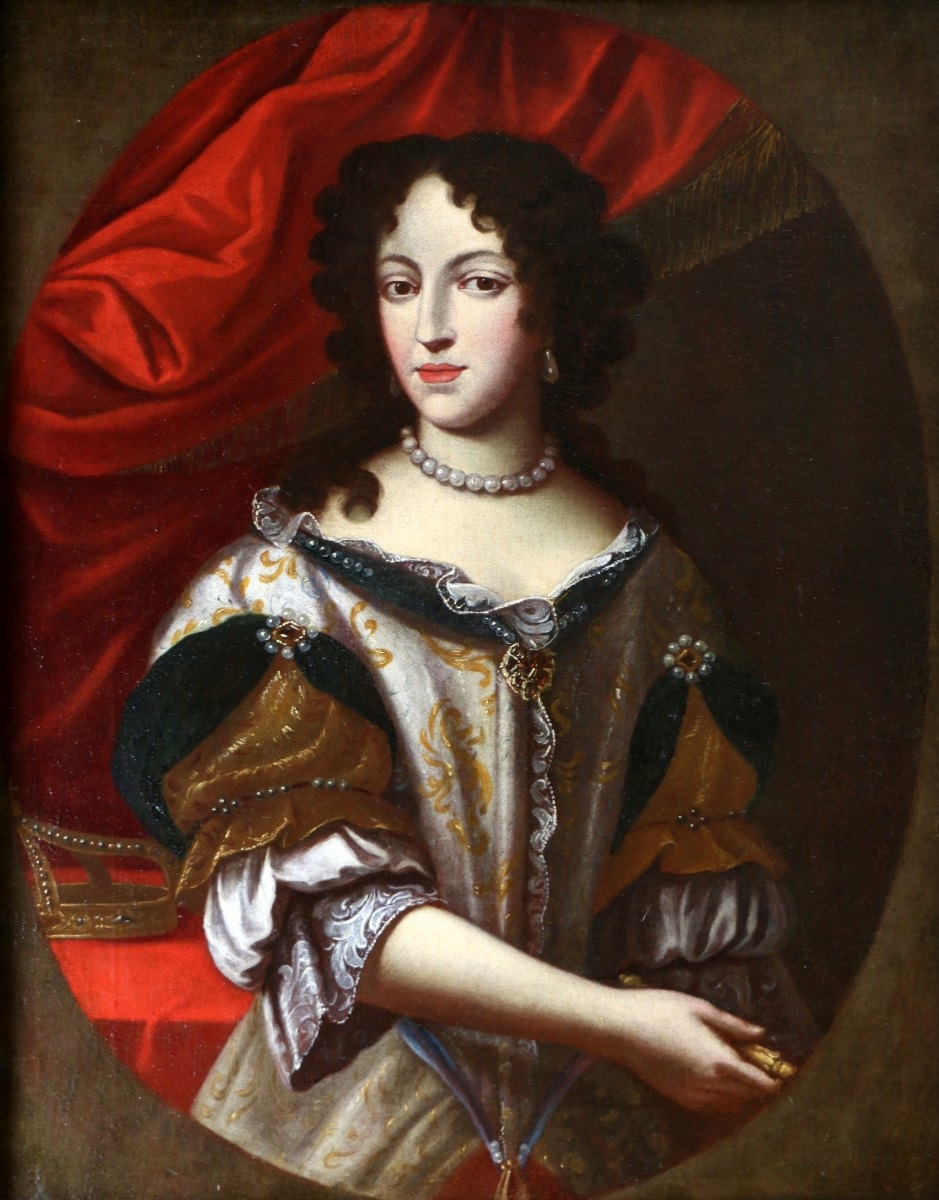
Portrait of Marie Casimire

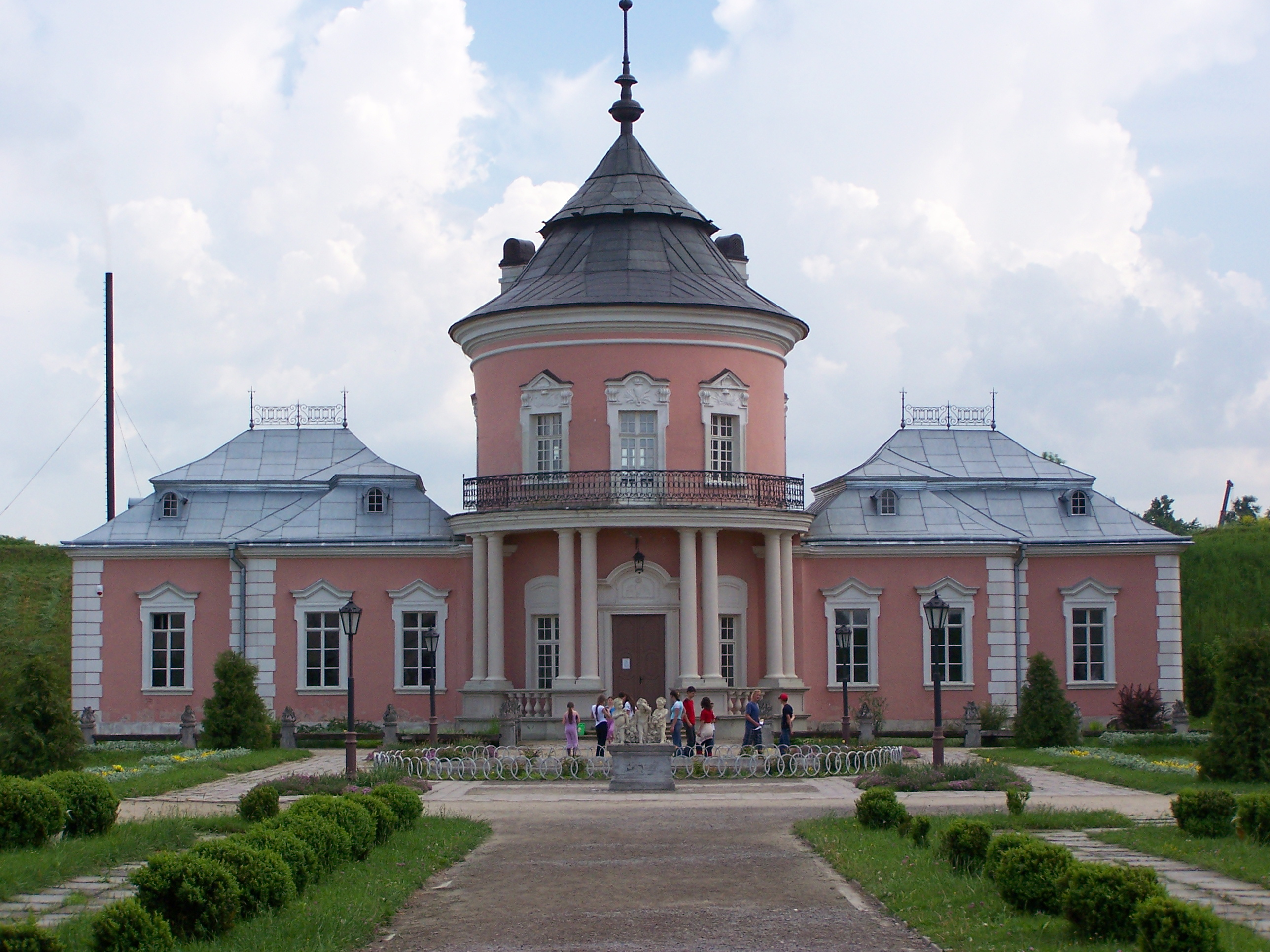
The Queen's Chinese Palace

== See also ==
- Marywil and Marymont, two places named after Marysieńka.
- Wilanów Palace

== Notes ==
Marie Casimire d'Arquien Born: 28 June 1641 Died: 1 January 1716
Royal titles
Preceded by Eleonora Maria of Austria	Queen consort of Poland; Grand Duchess consort of Lithuania; 1676 – 1696	Succeeded by Christiane Eberhardine of Brandenburg-Bayreuth
