= Louise Marie de La Grange d'Arquien =

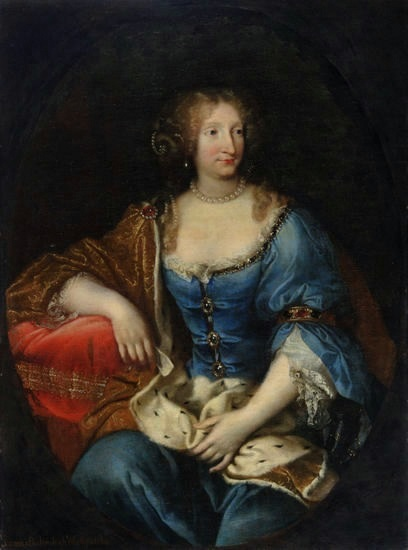
Louise Marie de La Grange d'Arquien

Louise Marie de La Grange d'Arquien (28 June 1638 – 11 November 1728) was a French noblewoman, the elder sister of Marie Casimire Louise de La Grange d'Arquien, Queen of Poland.

She was born in France to Henri Albert de La Grange d'Arquien and Françoise de La Châtre. She served as fille d'honneur to Queen Marie Therese of France prior to her marriage. In 1668, Louise Marie married François Gaston de Béthune, marquis de Chabris, and they had four children, including Louis Marie Victor, comte de Béthune, and Jeanne de Béthune, wife of Count Jan Stanisław Jabłonowski. She also suffered 10 miscarriages between 1668 and 1683. She followed her sister to Poland and had an influential position in the court of her sister until the Count de Bethune was exiled, when she was forced to follow him.

She died in Paris in 1728.
