= Henri Albert de La Grange d'Arquien =

- Marquis of Arquien
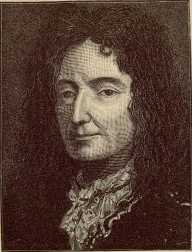
- Henri Albert de La Grange d'Arquien
- Born: 8 September 1613; Calais
- Died: 24 May 1707 (aged 93); Rome
- Buried: San Luigi dei Francesi
- Spouse: Françoise de La Châtre
- Issue: Marie Casimire, Queen of Poland
- Father: Antoine de La Grange d'Arquien
- Mother: Anne d'Ancienville

Henri Albert de La Grange d'Arquien, Marquis of Arquien (8 September 1613 – 24 May 1707) was born in Calais, France, the son of Antoine de La Grange d'Arquien, governor of Calais, and Anne d'Ancienville. His surname is also listed as Lagrange.

Henri was first married to Françoise de La Châtre (1613–1648). They had twelve children, but only two survived childhood:

1. Pierre (1634–1638)
2. Paul (1635–1638)
3. Catherine (1636–1638)
4. Louise Marie (1638–1728)
5. Marguerite (1639–1641)
6. Marie Caroline (1640–1641)
7. Marie Casimire (1641–1716), who became queen of Poland.
8. Francoise (1642–1646)
9. Anne (1643–1643)
10. Antoine (1645–1653)
11. Francois (1646–1646)
12. Jeanne (1647–1647)

Henri then married Charlotte de La Fin de Salins. They had six children, all of whom died in childhood:

- Sophie (1650–1655)
- Conradine (1651–1655)
- Stillborn child (1652)
- Christine (23 October 1653 – 7 January 1654).
- Charlotte (1 June 1656 – 15 May 1657).
- Charles (16 February 1658 – 8 July 1659).

Henri was named a knight at Żółkiew, Poland, on 13 April 1694. He became a Cardinal of the Roman Catholic Church in 1695; he was Cardinal deacon of San Nicola in Carcere. He died in Rome on 24 May 1707 and was buried in San Luigi dei Francesi.

Catholic Church titles
Preceded by Gianfrancesco Ginetti	Cardinal-Deacon of San Nicola in Carcere; 1699–1707	Succeeded by Lorenzo Altieri
Records
Preceded by Alderano Cybo	Oldest living Member of the Sacred College; 22 July 1700 – 24 May 1707	Succeeded by Gaspare Carpegna
