= Wilanów Palace =

Royal palace located in Warsaw, Poland

- Pałac w Wilanowie
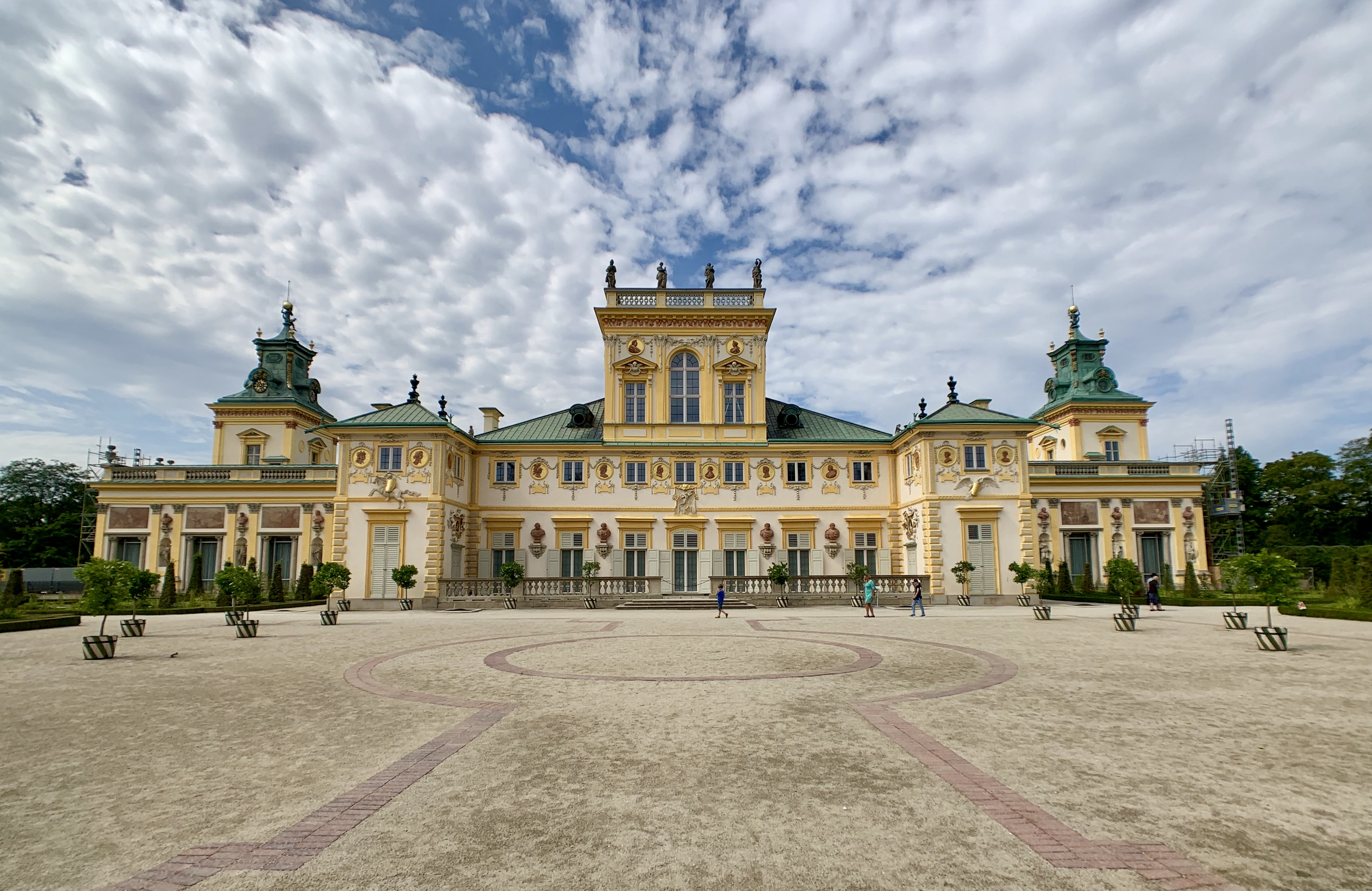
- View of the façade from the gardens
- Interactive fullscreen map

General information
- Type: Palace
- Architectural style: Baroque
- Location: Warsaw, Poland
- Coordinates: 52°09′55″N 21°05′25″E
- Current tenants: Wilanów Palace Museum
- Construction started: 23 April 1677
- Completed: 1696
- Client: John III Sobieski
- Owner: National Museum, Warsaw

Design and construction
- Architect: Augustyn Wincenty Locci

Website
- www.wilanow-palac.pl

Wilanów Palace (Polish: Pałac w Wilanowie, Polish pronunciation: [ˈpawad͡z v vilaˈnɔvjɛ]) is a former royal palace located in the Wilanów district of Warsaw, Poland. It was built between 1677 and 1696 for the King of Poland and Grand Duke of Lithuania John III Sobieski according to a design by architect Augustyn Wincenty Locci. Wilanów Palace survived World Wars, and so serves as one of the most remarkable examples of Baroque architecture in the country.

It is one of Poland's most important monuments. The palace's museum, established in 1805, is a repository of the country's royal and artistic heritage and receives around 3 million visitors annually (2019), making it one of the most visited palaces and monuments in the world. The palace and park in Wilanów host cultural events and concerts, including Summer Royal Concerts in the Rose Garden and the International Summer Early Music Academy.

The palace, together with other elements of Warsaw Old Town, is one of Poland's official national Historic Monuments, as designated on 16 September 1994. Its listing is maintained by the National Institute of Cultural Heritage. Since 2006, the palace has been a member of the international Association of the Royal Residences of Europe.

== History ==
Wilanów Palace was built for King John III Sobieski in the last quarter of the 17th century and later was enlarged by other owners. It represents the characteristic type of Baroque suburban residence built entre cour et jardin (between the entrance court and the garden). Its architecture is original, a merger of generally European art with distinctively Polish building traditions. Upon its elevations and in the palace interiors ancient symbols glorify the Sobieski family, especially the military triumphs of the king.

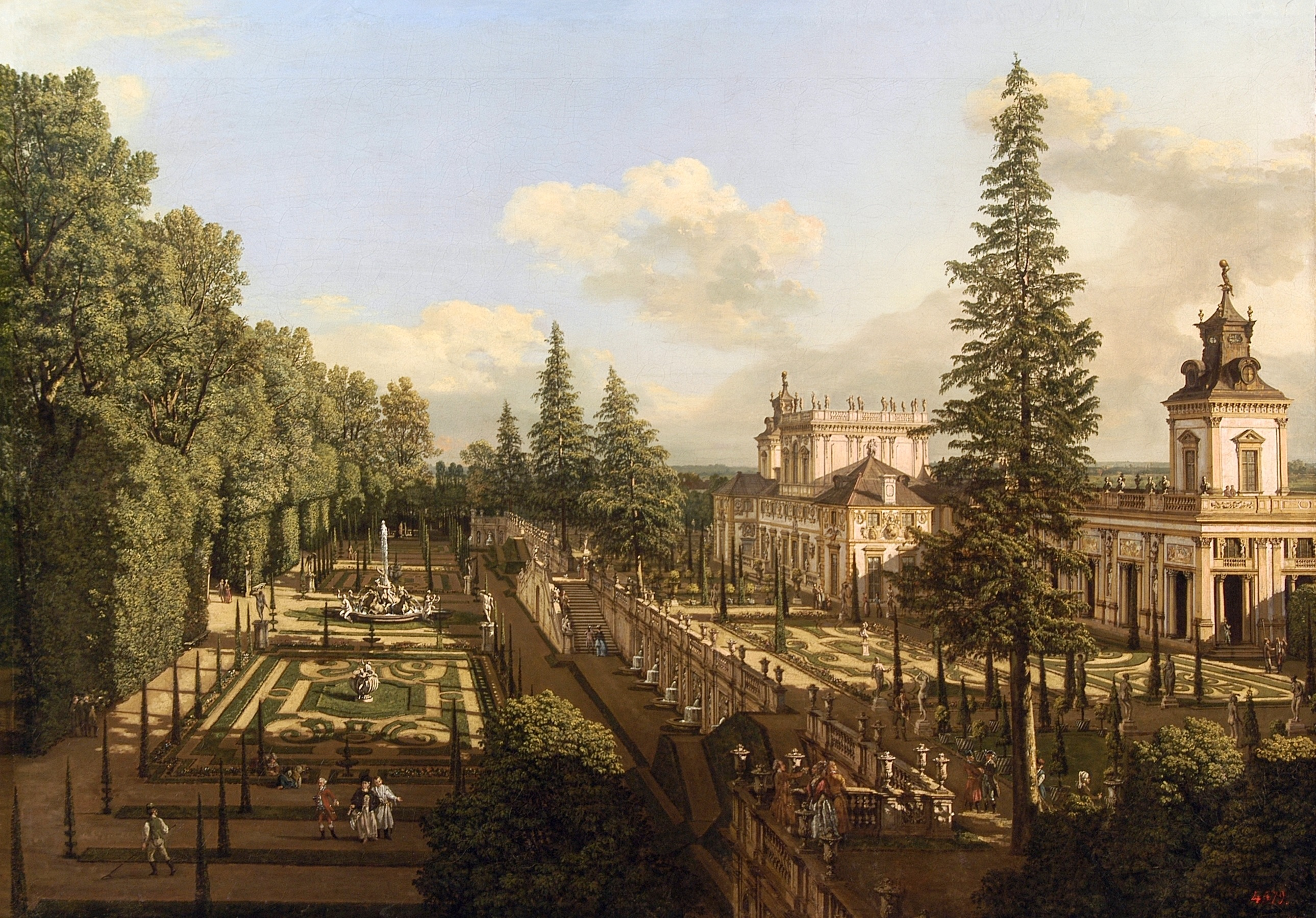
Wilanów Palace as seen from north-east by Bernardo Bellotto (1777).

After the death of John III Sobieski in 1696, the palace was owned by his sons and later by the famous magnate families Sieniawskis, Czartoryskis, Lubomirskis, Potockis and Branicki family. In 1720, the property was purchased by Polish stateswoman Elżbieta Sieniawska who enlarged the palace. Between 1730 and 1733 it was a residence of Augustus II the Strong, the king of Poland (the palace was exchanged with him for the Blue Palace at Senatorska Street), and after his death, the property came to Sieniawska's daughter Maria Zofia Czartoryska. Every owner changed the interiors of the palace, as well as the gardens and grounds, according to the current fashion and needs. In 1778 the estate was inherited by Izabela Lubomirska, called The Blue Marquise. She refurbished some of the interiors in the neoclassical style between 1792 and 1793 and build a corps de garde, a kitchen building and a bathroom building under the supervision of Szymon Bogumił Zug.

In the year 1805, the owner Stanisław Kostka Potocki, opened a museum in a part of the palace, one of the first public museums in Poland. A most notable example of the collections is Potocki's equestrian portrait made by renowned neoclassical French artist Jacques-Louis David in 1781. Besides European and Oriental art, the central part of the palace displayed a commemoration of King John III Sobieski and the glorious national past. The palace was damaged by German forces in World War II, but it was not demolished after the 1944 Warsaw Uprising. After the war, the palace was renovated, and most of the collection stolen by Germany was repatriated. In 1962 it was reopened to the public.

== Design ==
=== Exterior structure ===
The structure was designed by Augustyn Wincenty Locci. The architecture of the palace is a unique example of different building traditions - reminiscent of Polish aristocratic mansions with side towers, the Italian suburban villa and French palaces entre cour et jardin with two oblong wings on each side of the cour d'honneur.

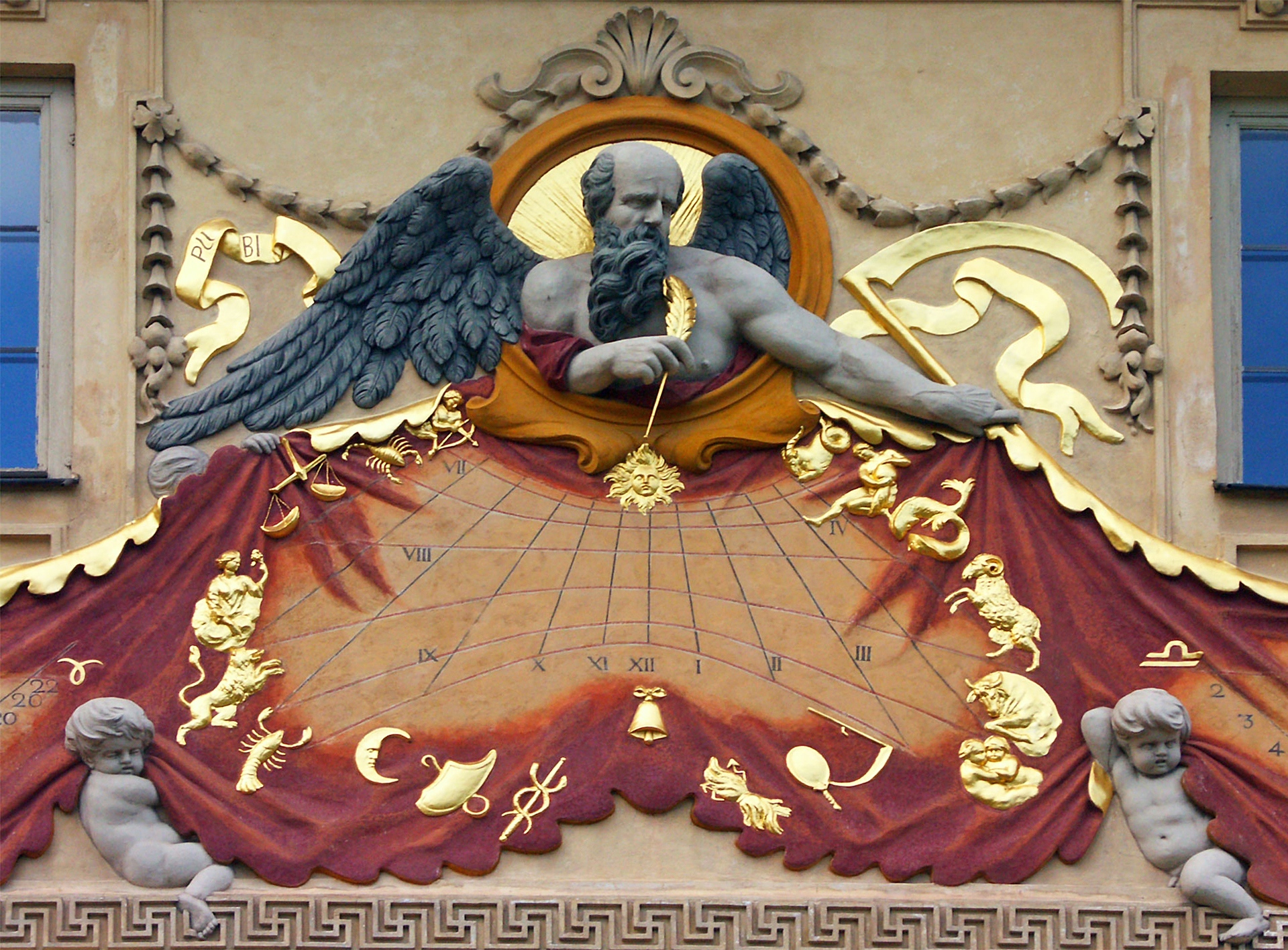
Sundial with Chronos.

During the first stage of construction, between 1677 and 1680, the building was a typical Polish manor house with four alcove towers attached to the one-storeyed square building. Between 1681 and 1688, the building was enhanced and two gallery wings ending with towers were added. This new appearance was probably inspired by Palladio's Villa Montagnana. Shortly after the King's death the third stage of the reconstruction was accomplished. Between 1688 and 1696 the pavilion above the main building was erected and the towers were covered with baroque spires, all resembling the Villa Doria Pamphili in Rome (especially its initial design by Giovanni Francesco Grimaldi).

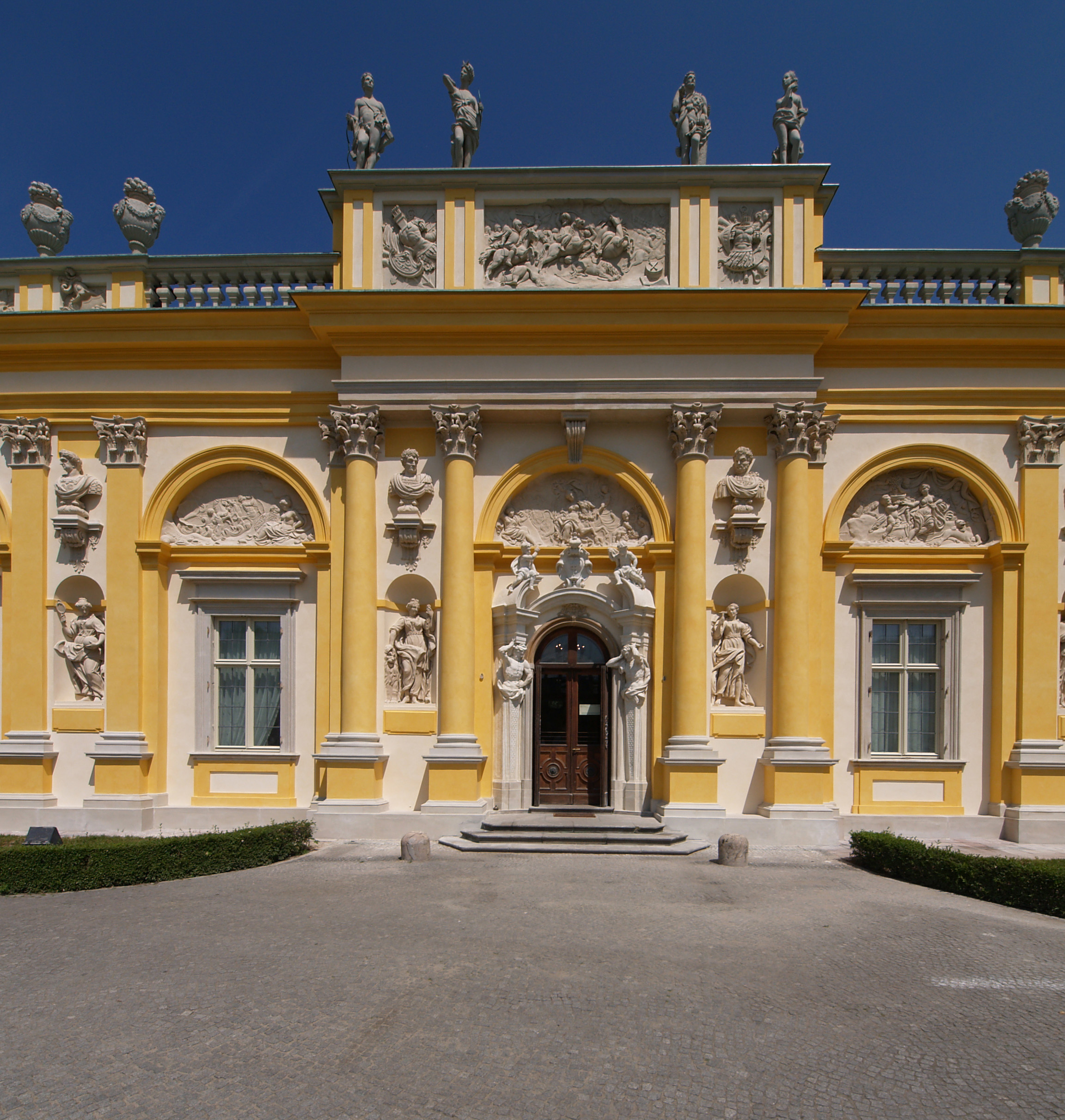
The north wing, erected by Elżbieta Sieniawska.

The King and his librarian Adam Adamandy Kochański took active part in the design and construction of the palace. The latter was responsible for the ideological and artistic programme, where motives and decoration elements played an essential role in glorifying the monarch, his wife and the Republic - busts of king and queen among the effigies of ancient characters, gods and goddesses, Roman emperors and empresses (such as the Dioscuri, Zeus-Amun, Sibyl, Romulus, Rhea Silvia, Alexander the Great, Cleopatra, Dido and Vespasian among others), Eagle and Pogonia, personifications of the Commonwealth regions (Masovia and Greater Poland, Samogitia, Red Ruthenia and Royal Prussia). They were issued by sculptors Andreas Schlüter (many reliefs and other secondary aspects of the façade), Stefan Szwaner and a stucco decorator named Antoni of Wilanów. Some of the sculptures were made in the Low Countries by Lodewijk Willemsens and Artus Quellinus the Elder workshop, shipped to Gdańsk and then transported to Warsaw. An ornate sundial on the south wall with Chronos, together with the opposite composition with Uranus on the north wall, were intended to underline the King's patronage of science and orderliness in the Commonwealth during his reign. They were executed by Antoni of Wilanów, according to the design by Johannes Hevelius (astronomical aspect), Adam Adamandy Kochański (mathematical aspect) and Augustyn Locci (artistic aspect).

The side wings embracing a courtyard, initiated by the King, were built long after his death by Elżbieta Sieniawska. They were constructed in the fourth stage of the enlargement between 1720 and 1729. Sieniawska was very concerned in maintaining the substantial historical residence of the Rex victoriossimus (Victorious King), as it was called. Despite that she transformed the palace into a French style palais enchanté according to a design by Giovanni Spazzio, with two new wings harmonious with the 17th century corps de logis. She employed the most renowned architects and artists for this undertaking, such as previously mentioned Spazzio, Jan Zygmunt Deybel, Józef Fontana, Jan Jerzy Plersch and Giovanni Rossi. While the original royal palace was decorated with reliefs depicting the deeds of John III, the new wings were adorned with battlefield achievements of Sieniawska's husband and father-in-law - Adam Mikołaj and Mikołaj Hieronim Sieniawski, Sobieski's comrades.

=== Interior space ===
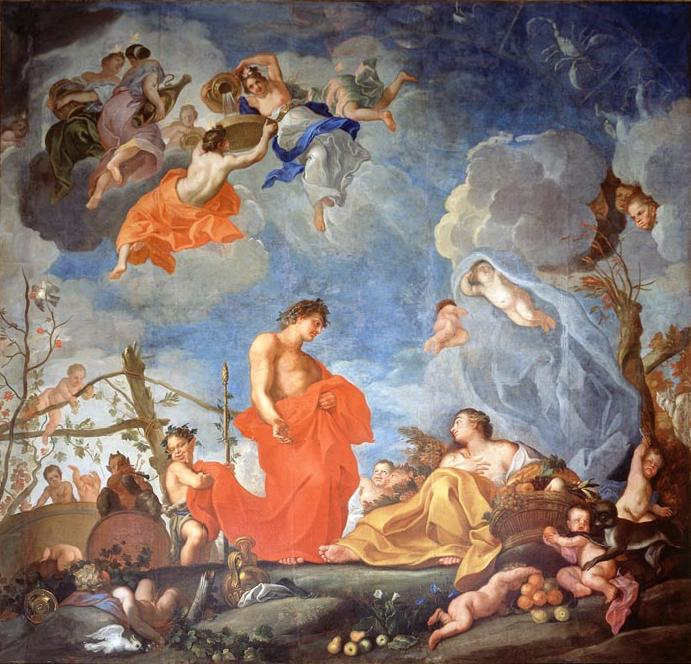
Plafond with Allegory of Autumn by Jerzy Siemiginowski-Eleuter.

The most prominent Polish and foreign artists participated in the decoration of the palace interiors. It was entrusted to painters Martino Altomonte, Jan Rayzner of Lviv, Michelangelo Palloni, sculptor Stefan Szwaner and stucco decorators Szymon Józef Bellotti, Antoni of Wilanów and Abraham Paris. They were supervised by the official court painters Claude Callot and later by Jerzy Siemiginowski-Eleuter. The latter, one of the greatest Polish painters of that time, had a significant influence on the palace's subsequent internal aspects (plafonds in the state rooms, frescoes). Internal decoration was also superintended by Adam Kochański, a great admirer of China, who supported closer economic relations of the Commonwealth with the "Central nation". Due to his influence, Wilanów and other residencies were full of luxury Chinese imports and chinoiserie.

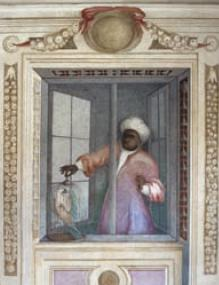
African servant carrying a parrot (detail of a fresco by Giuseppe Rossi).

The 17th-century palace inventories included the works of the greatest contemporary and ancient masters, like Rembrandt (Portuguese rabbi, The Girl in a Picture Frame, The Adoration of the Magi, Abraham and Hagar, Portrait of an old man in the so-called Dutch Room of the palace), Pieter van Laer, called Bamboccio (Travellers), Anthony van Dyck (Christ in the Garden of Gethsemane), Ferdinand van Kessel (battle scenes, allegorical paintings and still lifes), Raphael, Caracci brothers, Guido Reni and Bernardo Strozzi. The chambers were filled with precious furnishings, like silver folding screen, silver pyramid with 11 baskets, a three-storeyed silver fountain or a silk baldachin presented by the Shah of Persia. Unfortunately they were scattered by the successive proprietors, appropriated by Frederick Augustus of Saxony and transported to Dresden or looted by the Germans during World War II (e.g. John III's tortoise-shell cabinet, never retrieved).

Among the artists appointed for decoration of the palace's interiors in the 18th century were Giuseppe Rossi, an Italian fresco painter, who adorned the chambers with trompe-l'œil paintings and stucco decorators Francesco Fumo and Pietro Innocente Comparetti. Following the example of Queen Marie Casimire Sobieska, who ordered a painting of herself as a goddess on the palace plafonds, Elżbieta Sieniawska embellished the Lower Vestibule with a fresco of Flora. On her initiative, the walls in the royal chambers were covered with Genoan velvet. The walls of the second floor, that is the Great Dining Room, were covered with frescoes depicting Apollo, Minerva and Hercules as an allegory of Virtus Heroica (Heroic Valor), Hebe symbolizing Venustas (Beauty) completed with panoplies. Sieniawska's daughter, Maria Zofia Czartoryska, furnished the palace with new fireplaces made of white-cherry marble and crowned with mirrors in rich rococo frames.

In the contract with King Augustus II, Maria Zofia obliged him to preserve the palace unchanged. Therefore, his actions were limited to finishing the new dining room, called the White Room in the southern wing and to the decoration of some unfinished interiors. The plafonds and other paintings were executed by Julien Poison, Johann Samuel Mock and Lorenzo Rossi, while the decorative lacquer panneaux in the Chinese Room were made by Martin Schnell.

=== Garden ===
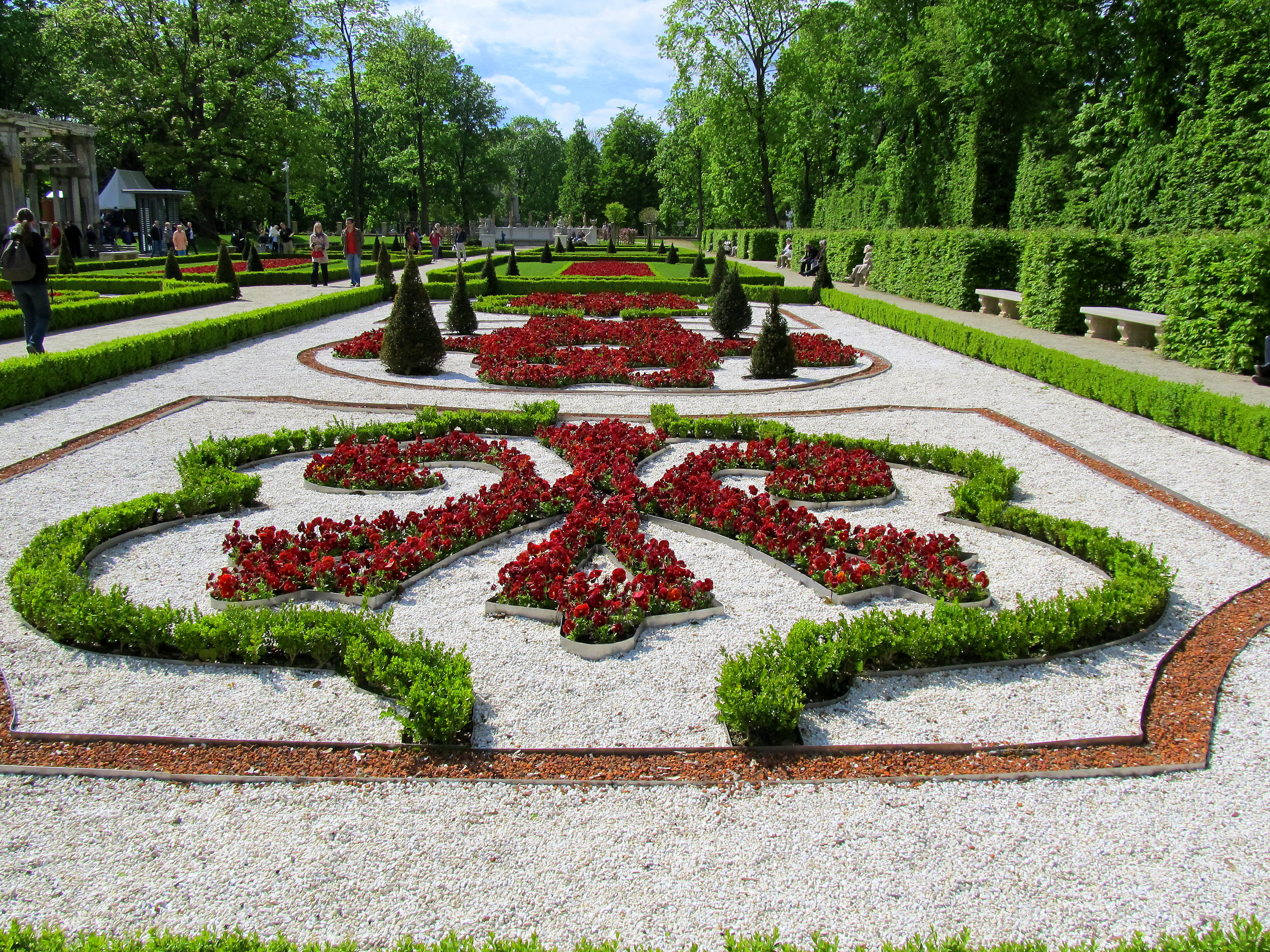
The palace gardens

An integral part of the palace, almost since its beginning, is the garden. Initially, it had the character of a baroque Italian garden in a semicircular form surrounding the palace on the east. In its composition this geometric garden fitted in well with the ancient patterns and the palace arrangement. It consisted of an upper garden located on a terrace with two arbours in the form of lanterns in each corner, and lower garden. During the third stage of the reconstruction of the palace the geometric garden parterres were replaced with embroidered parterres à la française inspired by André Le Nôtre's works. At that time the garden was embellished with gilded lead sculptures by Gaspar Richter of Gdańsk and vases carved in cherry marble from Chęciny. In the beginning of the 18th century the garden was enlarged, the late baroque parterre ornamentation was replaced with Régence motives completed with Sieniawska's coat of arms Szreniawa in the northern parts and her monogram in the southern part. In 1784 Izabela Lubomirska transformed neighbouring territories of Wilanów folwark into a jardin anglo-chinois according to Szymon Bogumił Zug's design. This new garden with rich vegetation, sinuous paths and cascades was inspired by works of William Chambers, Thomas Whately and August Moszyński.

== Panorama ==
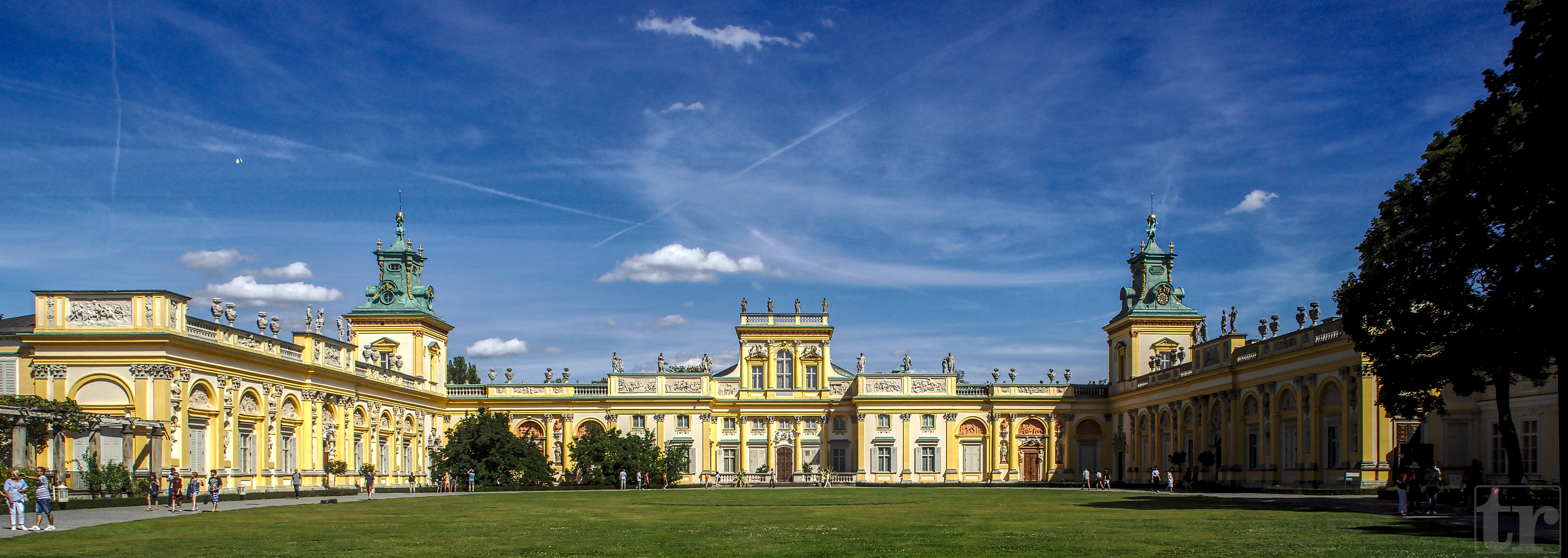
View of the corps de logis from the cour d'honneur

== Gallery ==
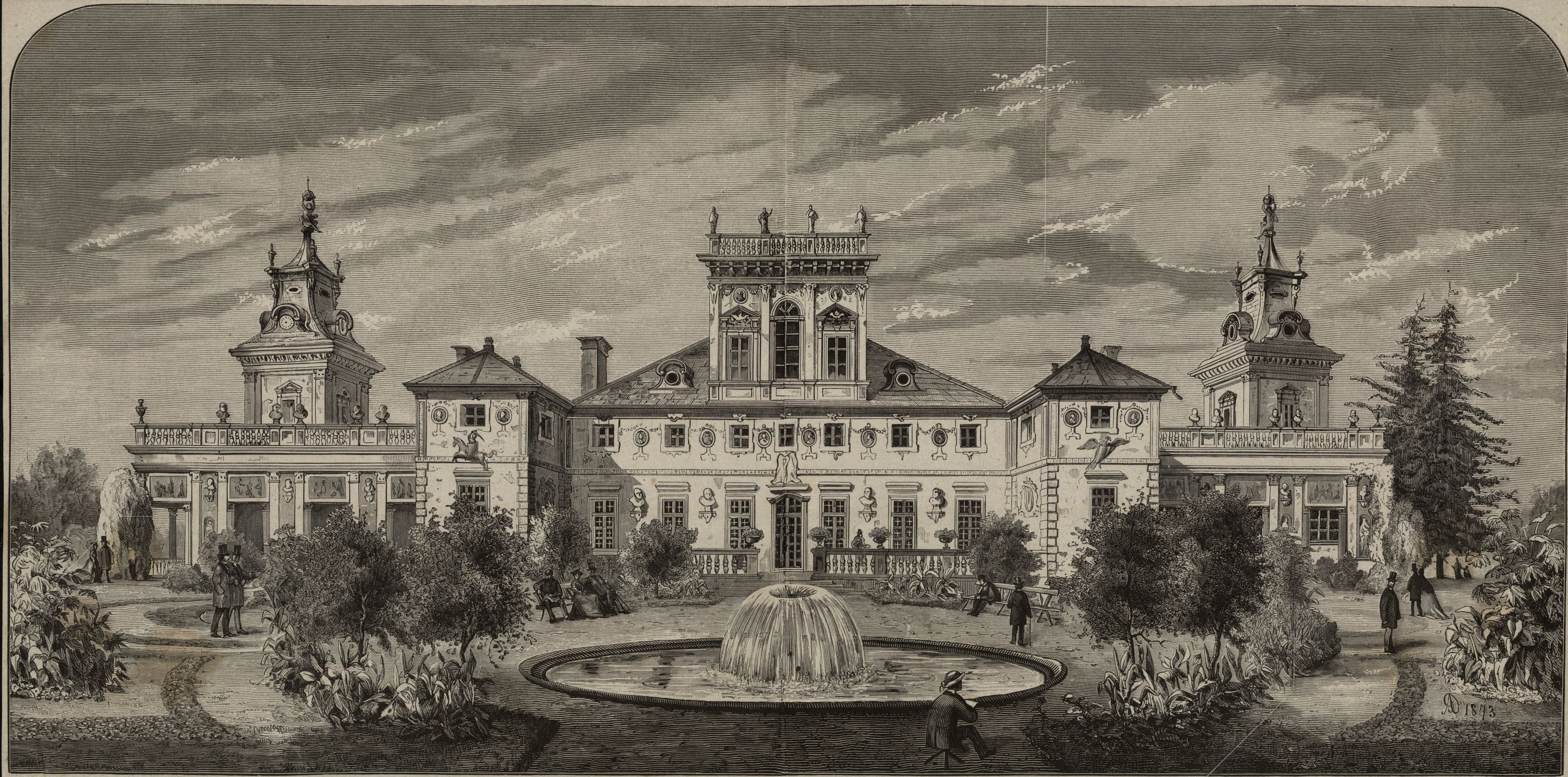
The Palace in Wilanów, an engraving by Michał Kluczewski, 1874

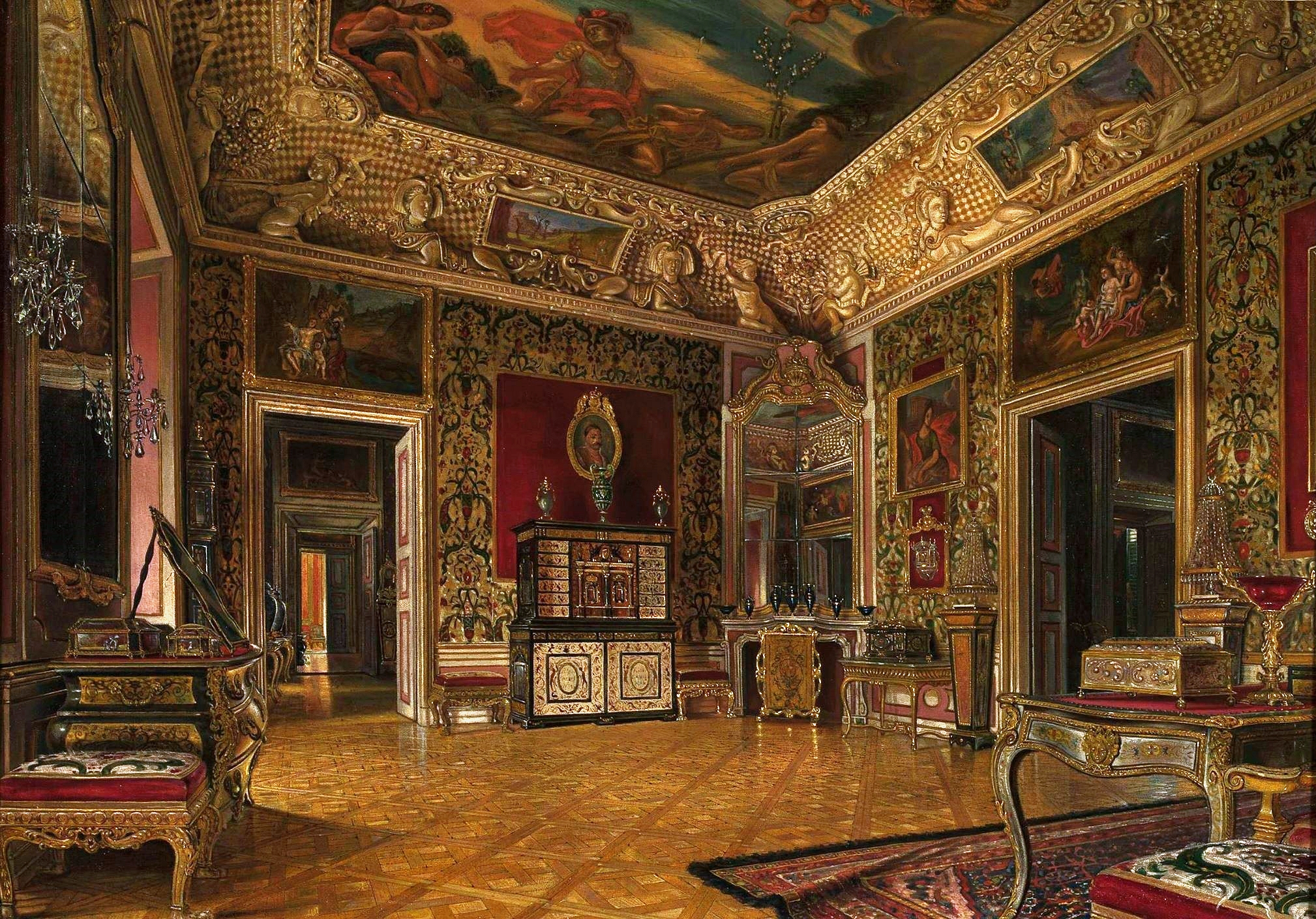
Queen's Bedroom in the Wilanów Palace by Aleksander Gryglewski, 1874

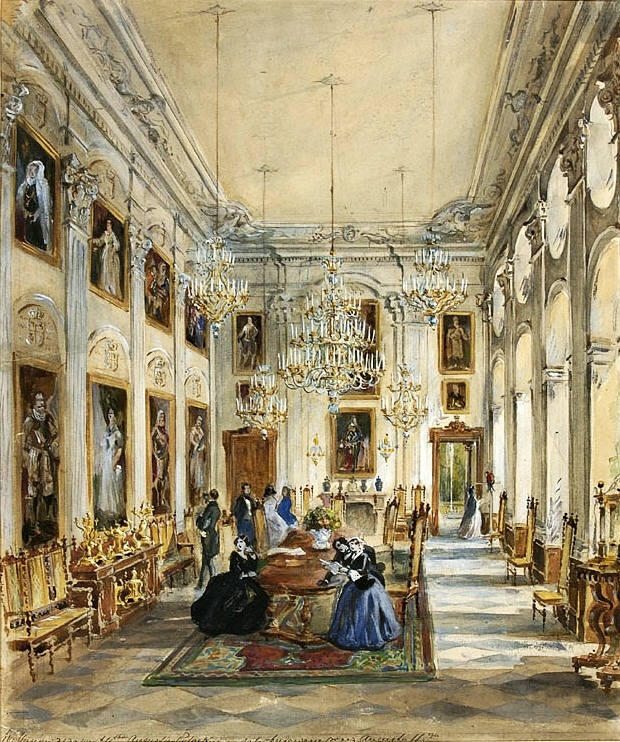
The White Room by Willibald Richter, 1850

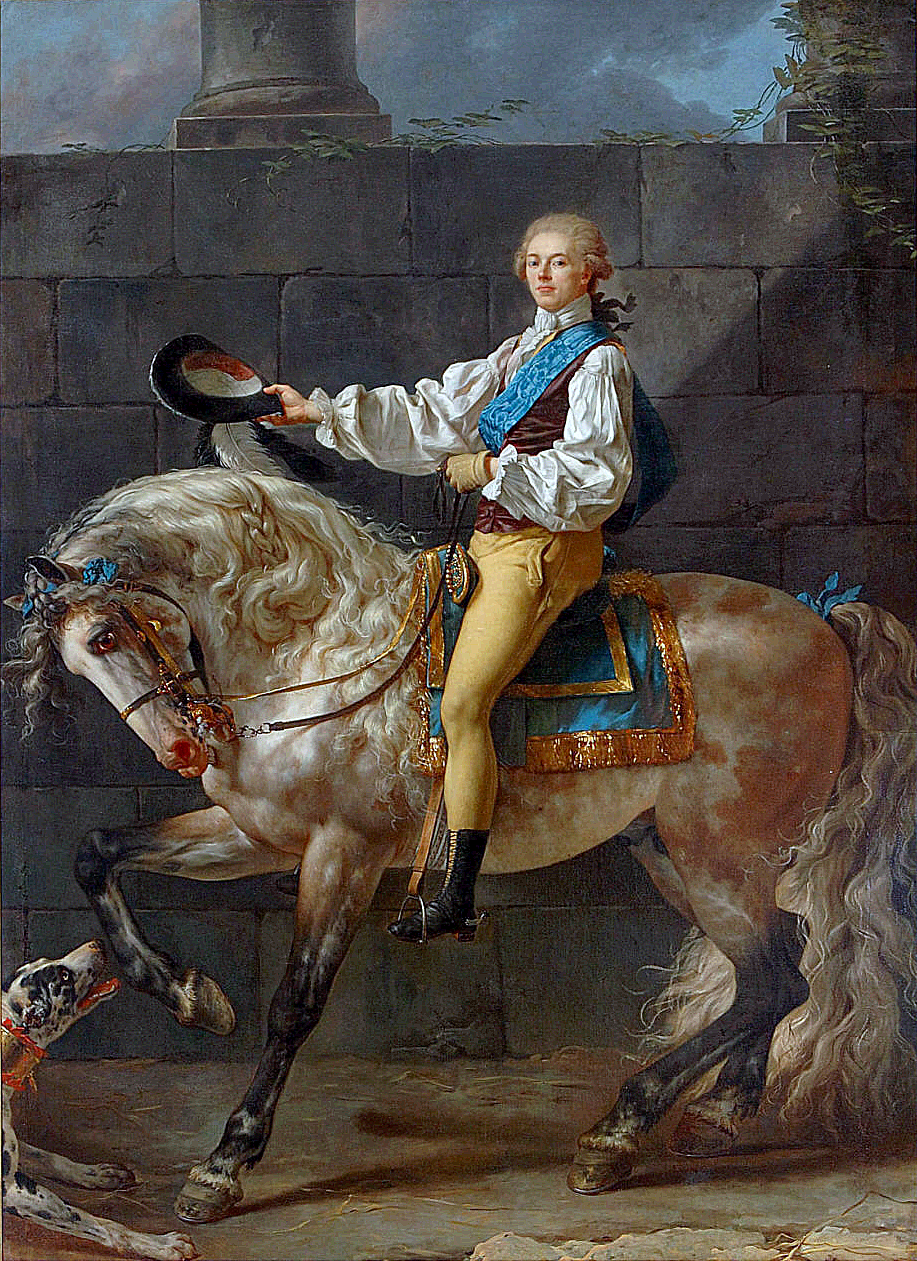
Portrait of Count Stanislas Potocki by Jacques-Louis David, 1781

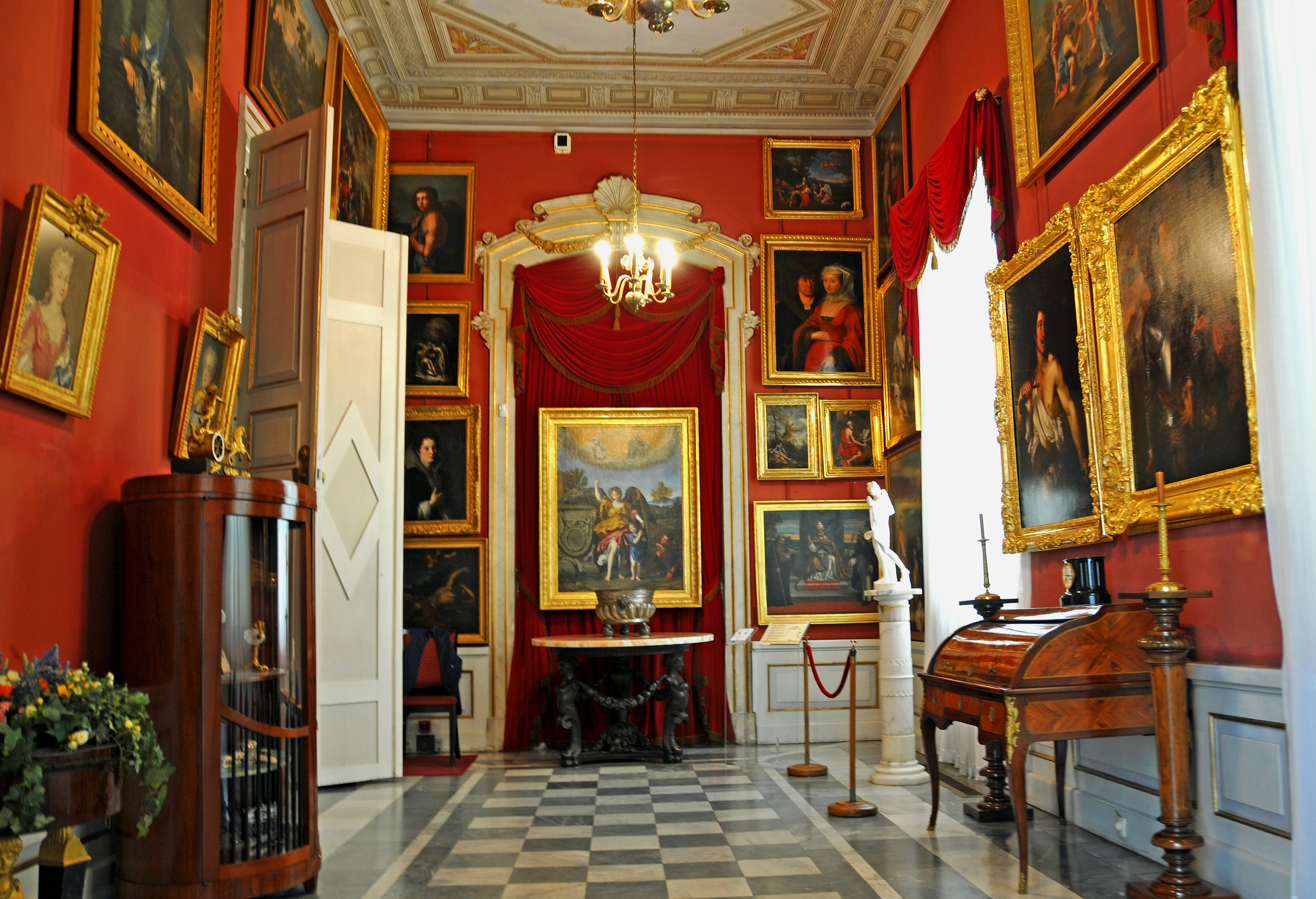
The interior of the palace featuring a gallery of paintings

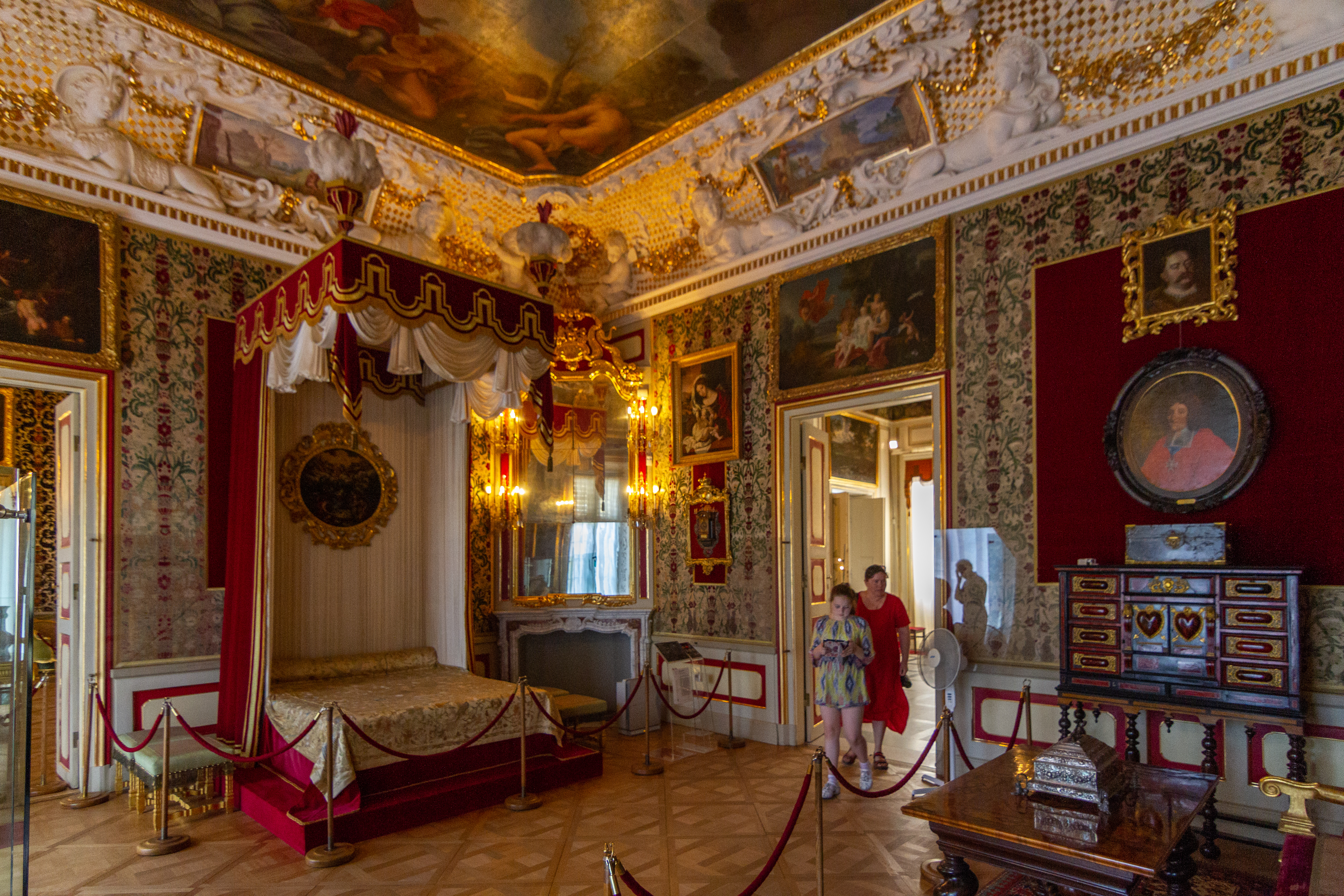
The palace interior

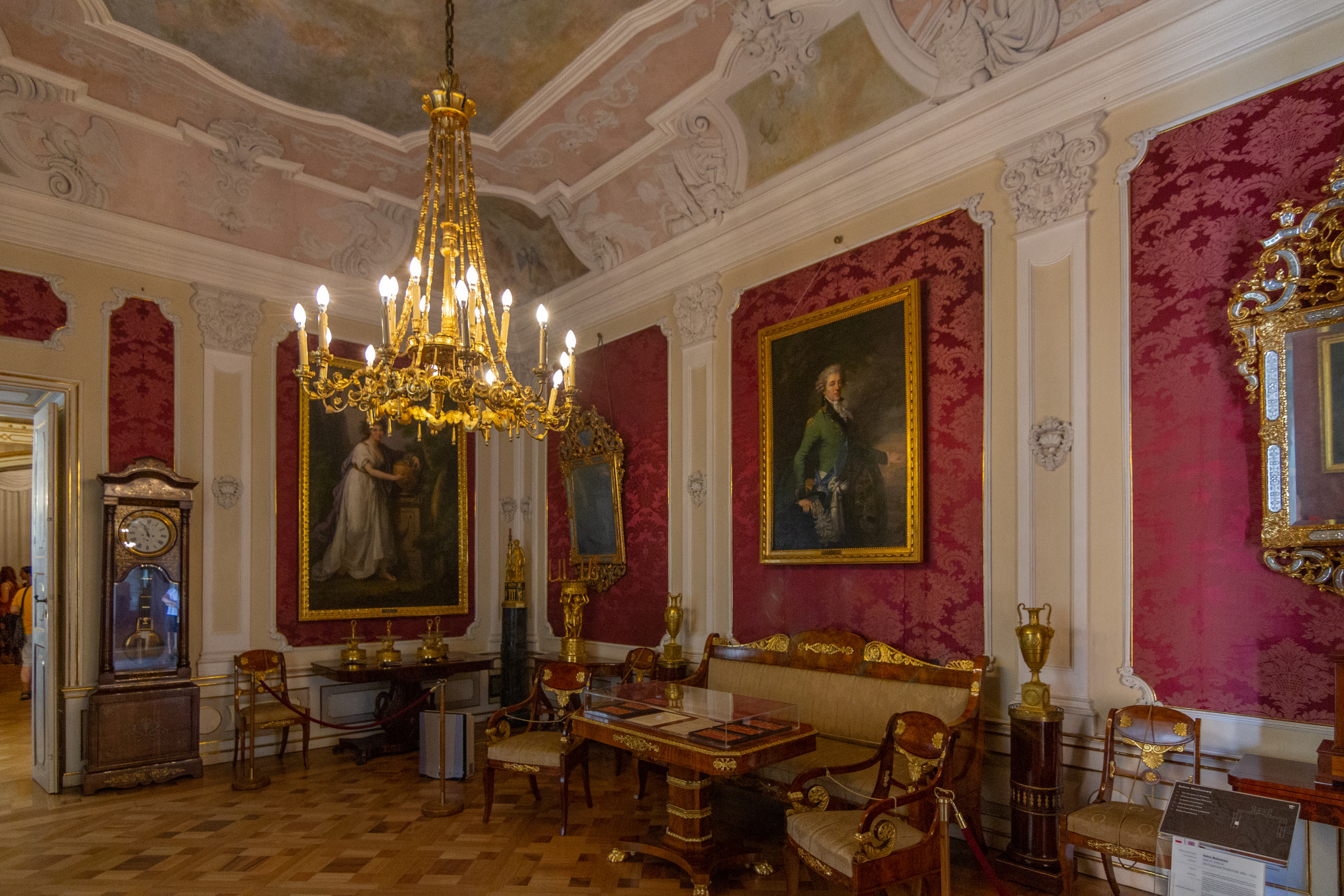
King's apartments

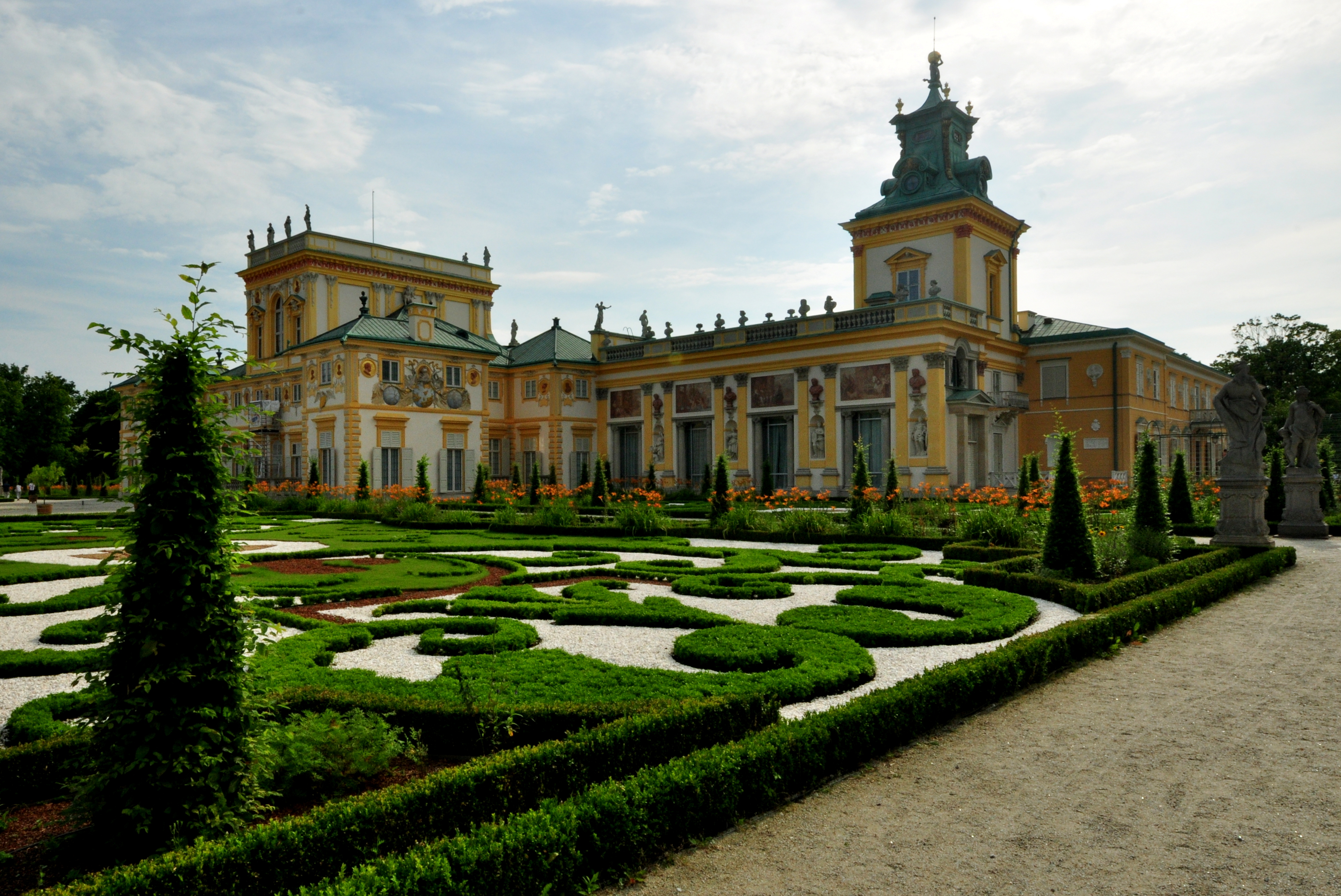
View of the palace from the gardens

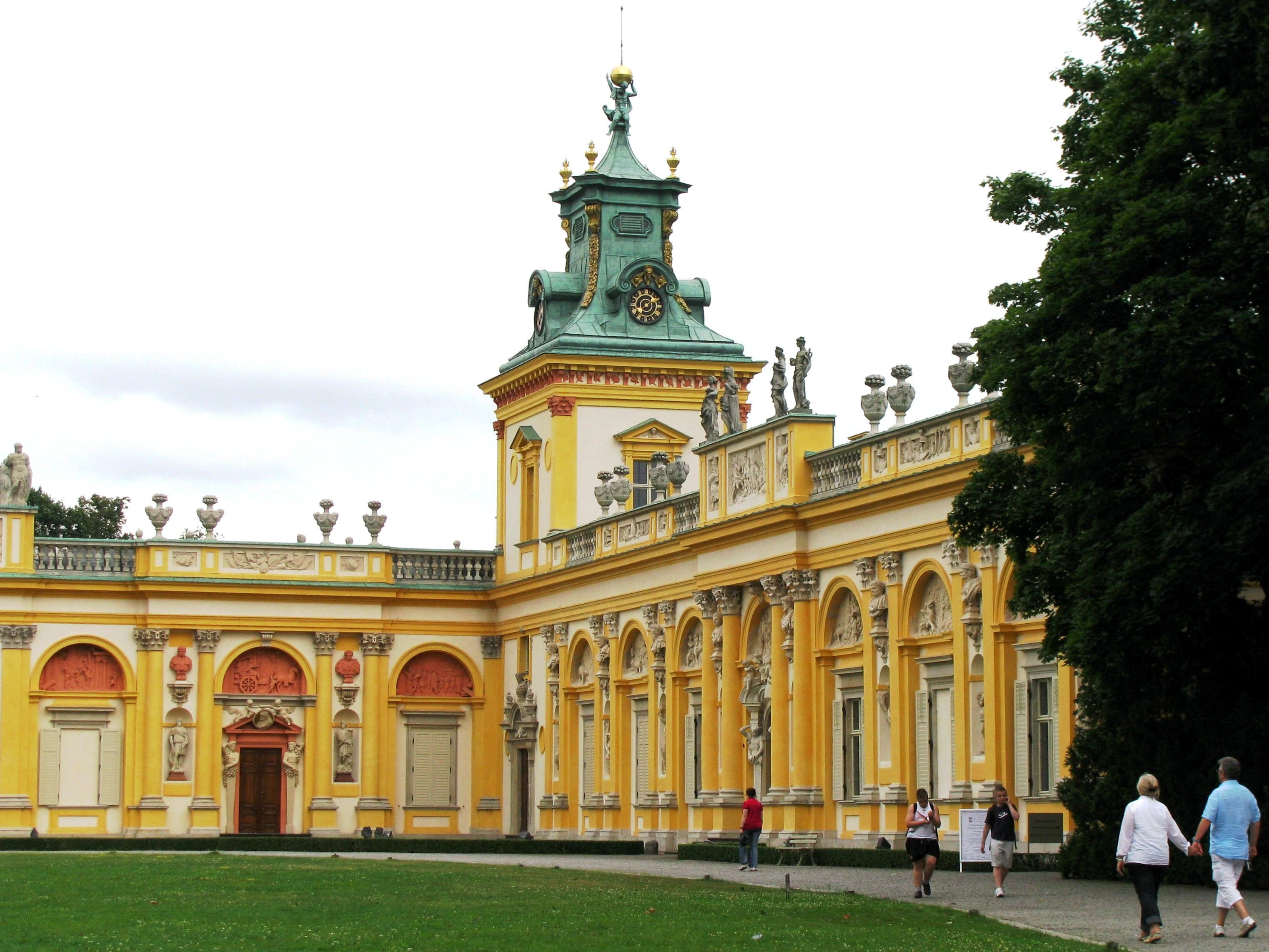
The south wing of the palace

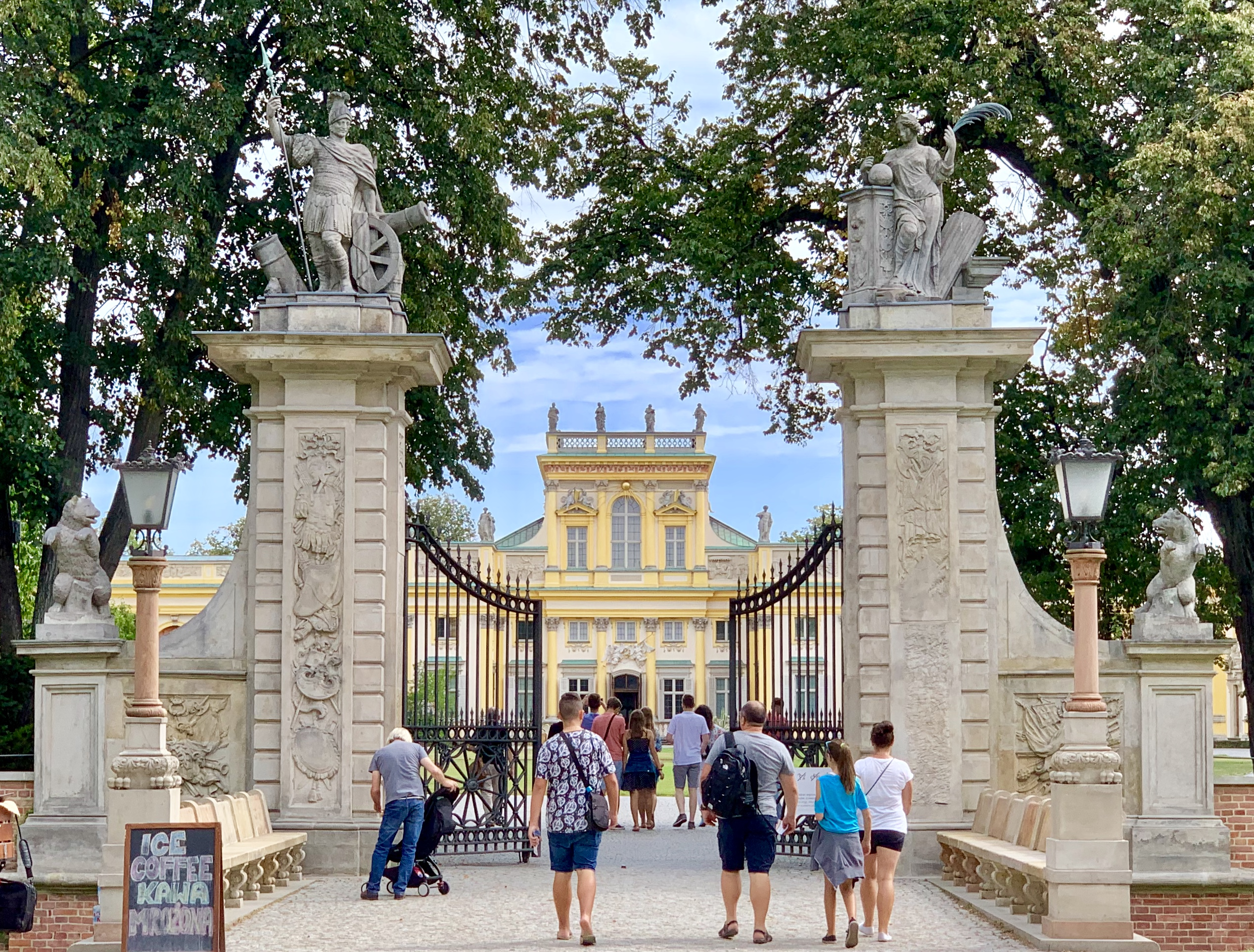
The main palace gate

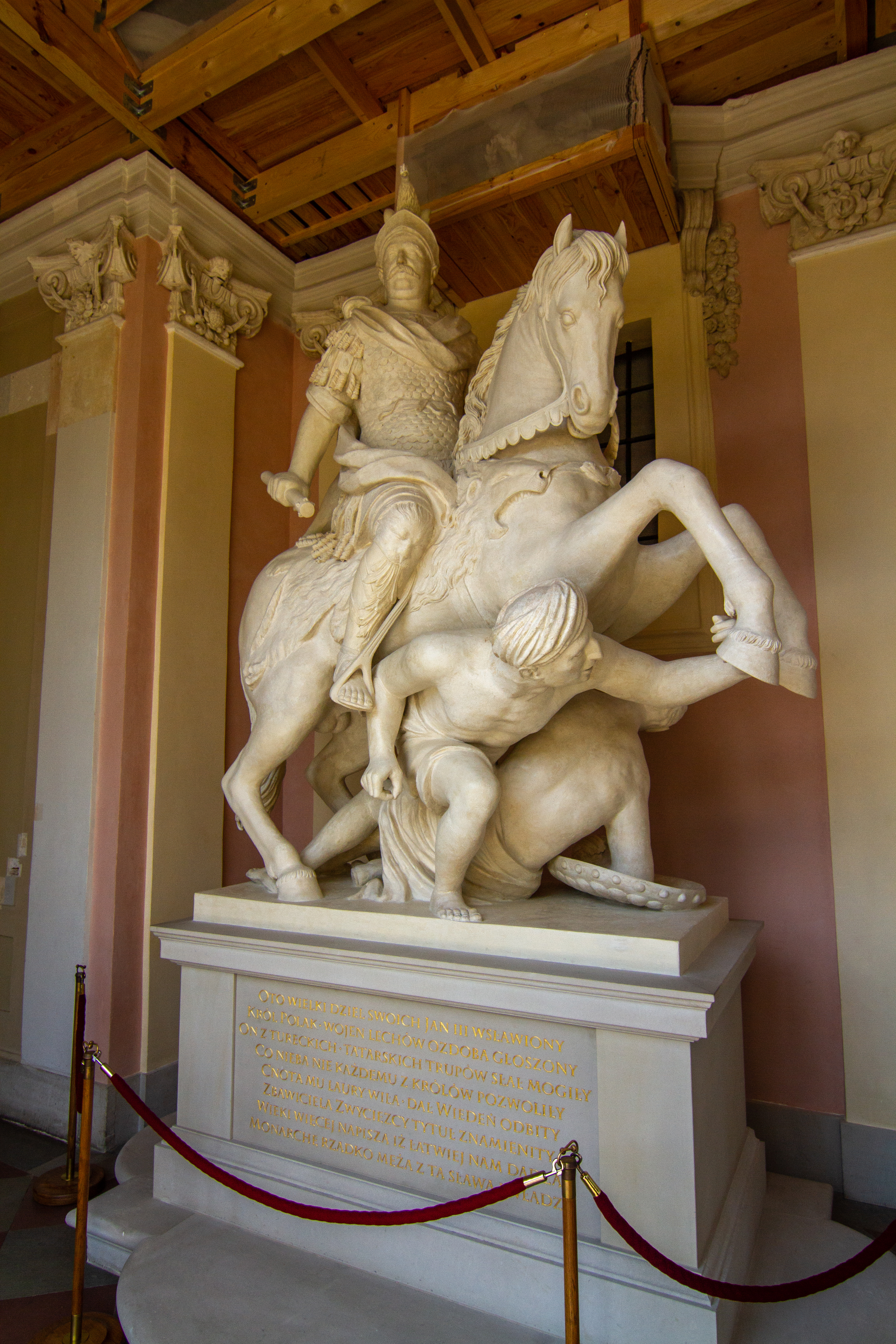
Statue of King John III Sobieski

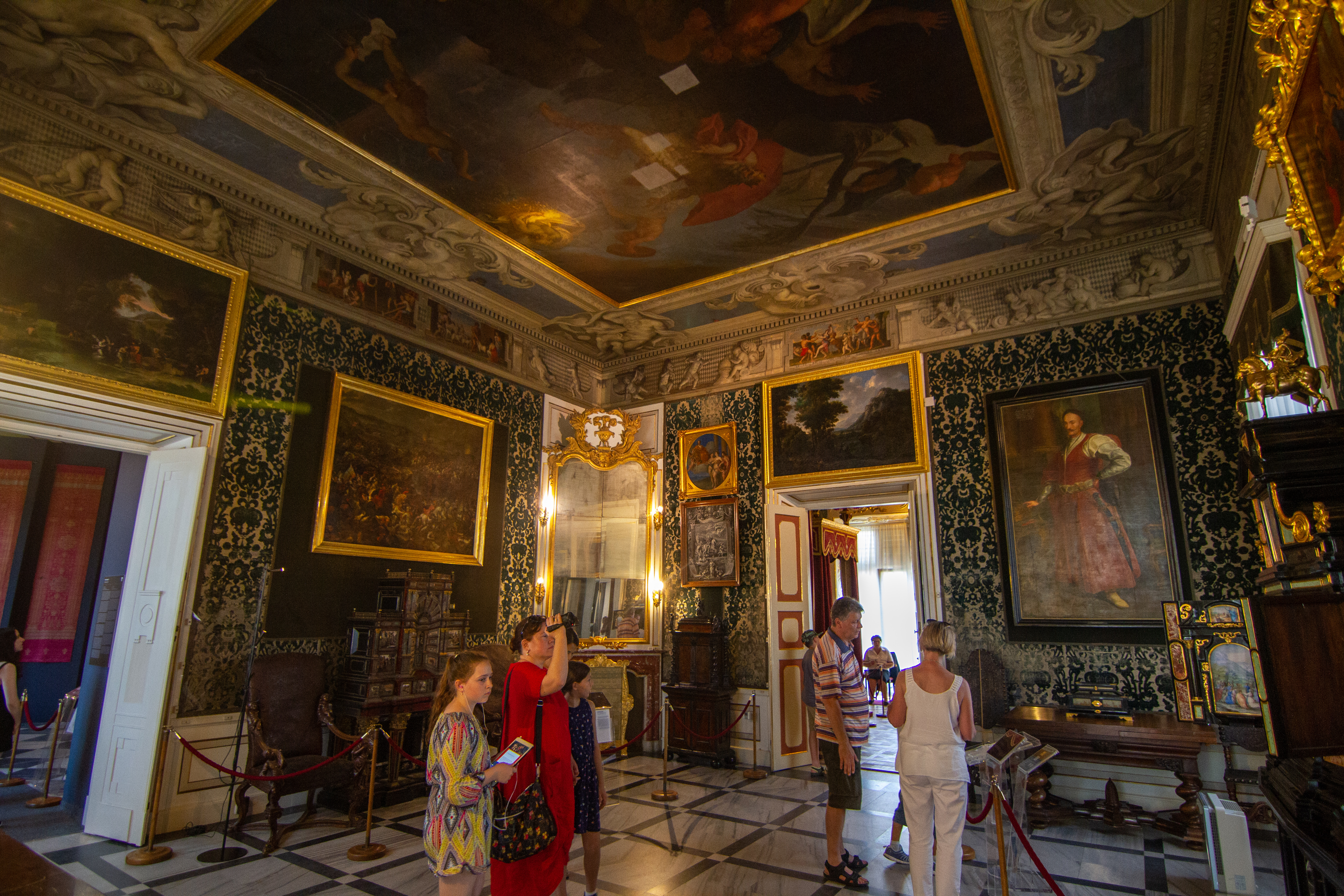
The King's Antechamber

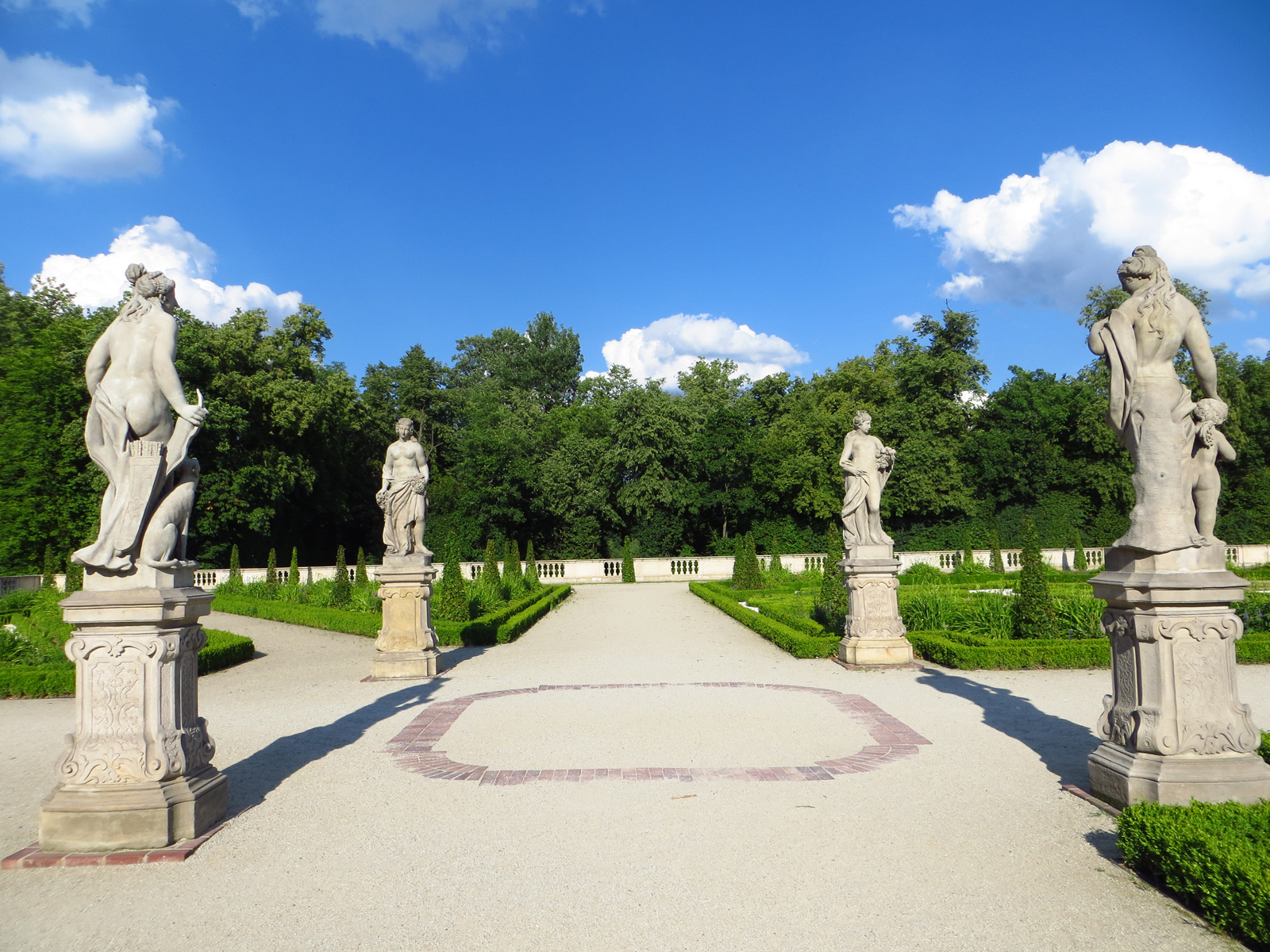
Garden sculptures

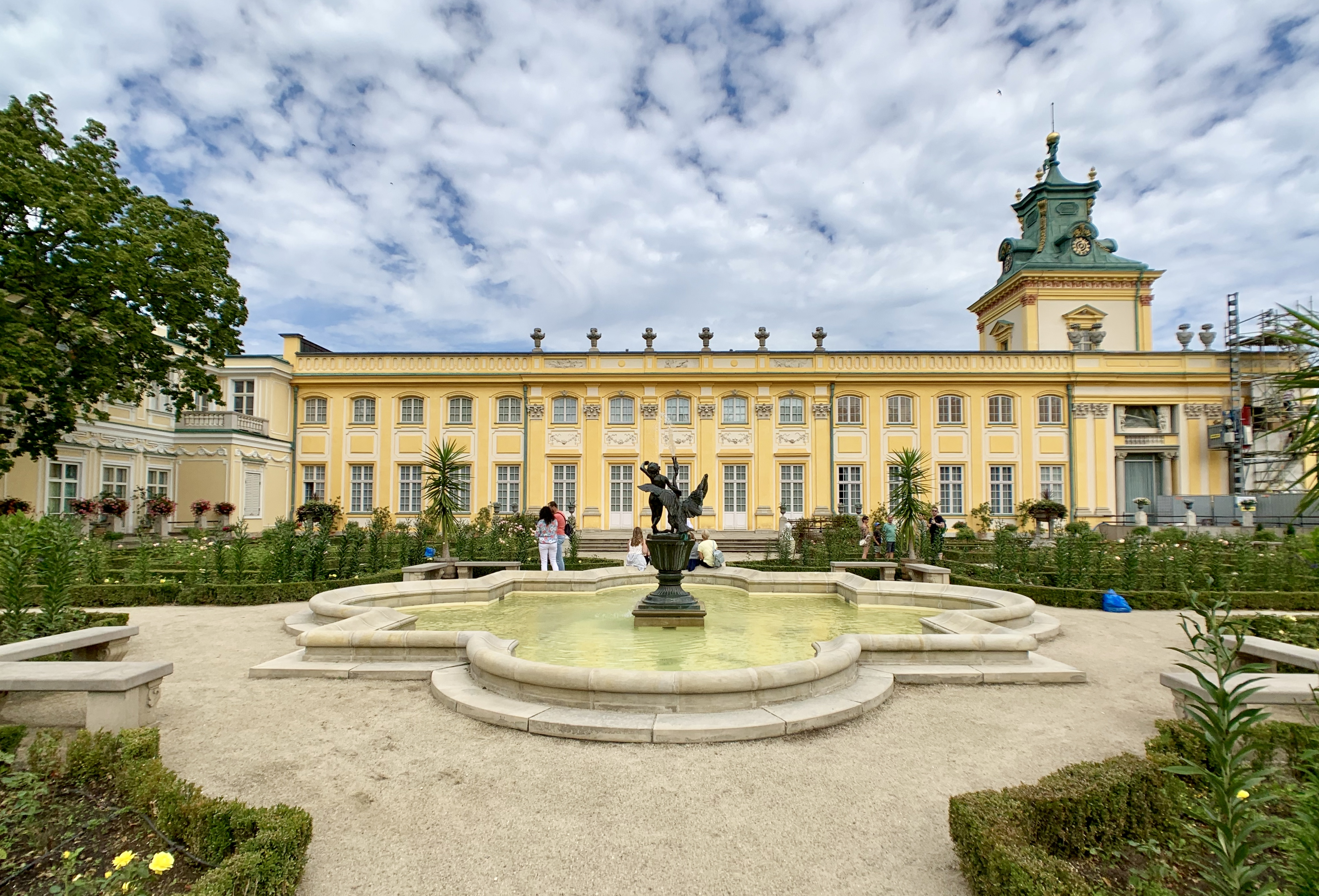
Fountain in the palace garden

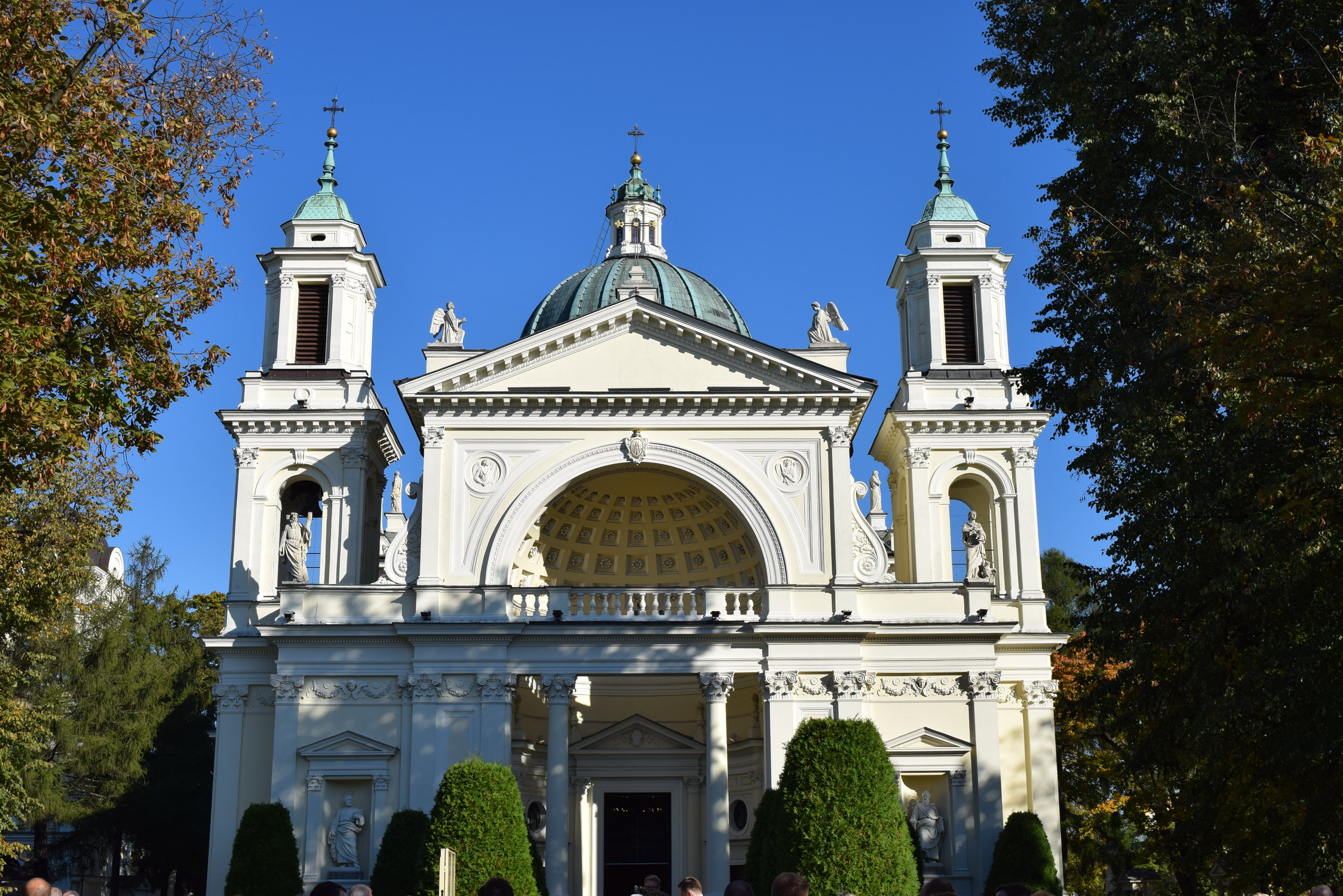
St. Anne's Church near the palace

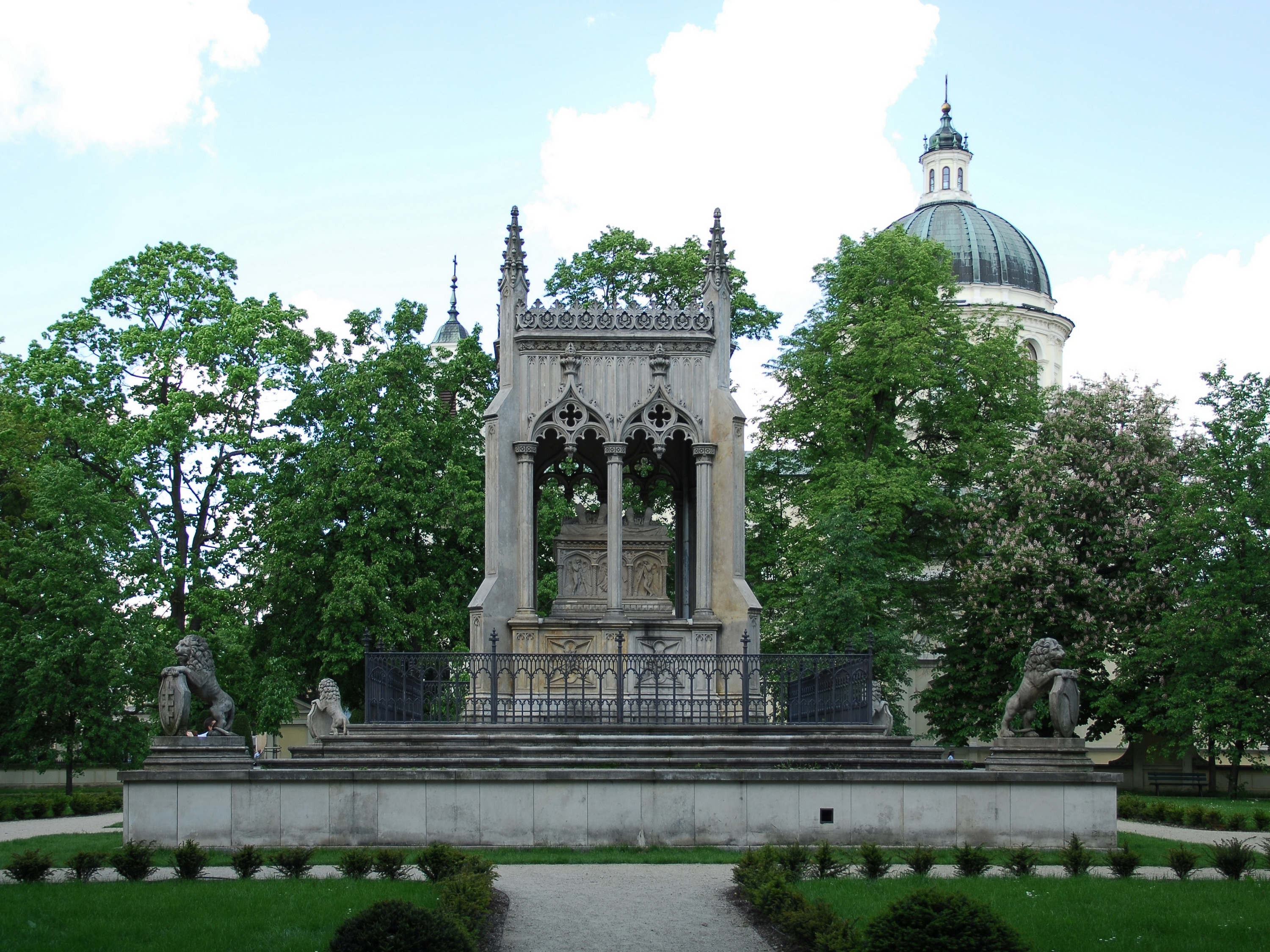
Mausoleum of the Potocki family

== See also ==
- List of palaces in Poland
- List of Baroque residences
- List of most visited palaces and monuments
- Museum of King John III's Palace at Wilanów

== Sources ==
1. Fijałkowski, Wojciech (1983), Wilanów. Rezydencja Króla Zwycięzcy (Wilanów. The residence of the Victorious King) (in Polish), Warsaw: Krajowa Agencja Wydawnicza.
2. Kieniewicz, Stefan (1984), Warszawa w latach 1526-1795 (Warsaw in 1526-1795) (in Polish), Warsaw: Krajowa Agencja Wydawnicza, ISBN 83-01-03323-1.
