= Painted ceiling =

Ceiling covered with an artistic mural or painting

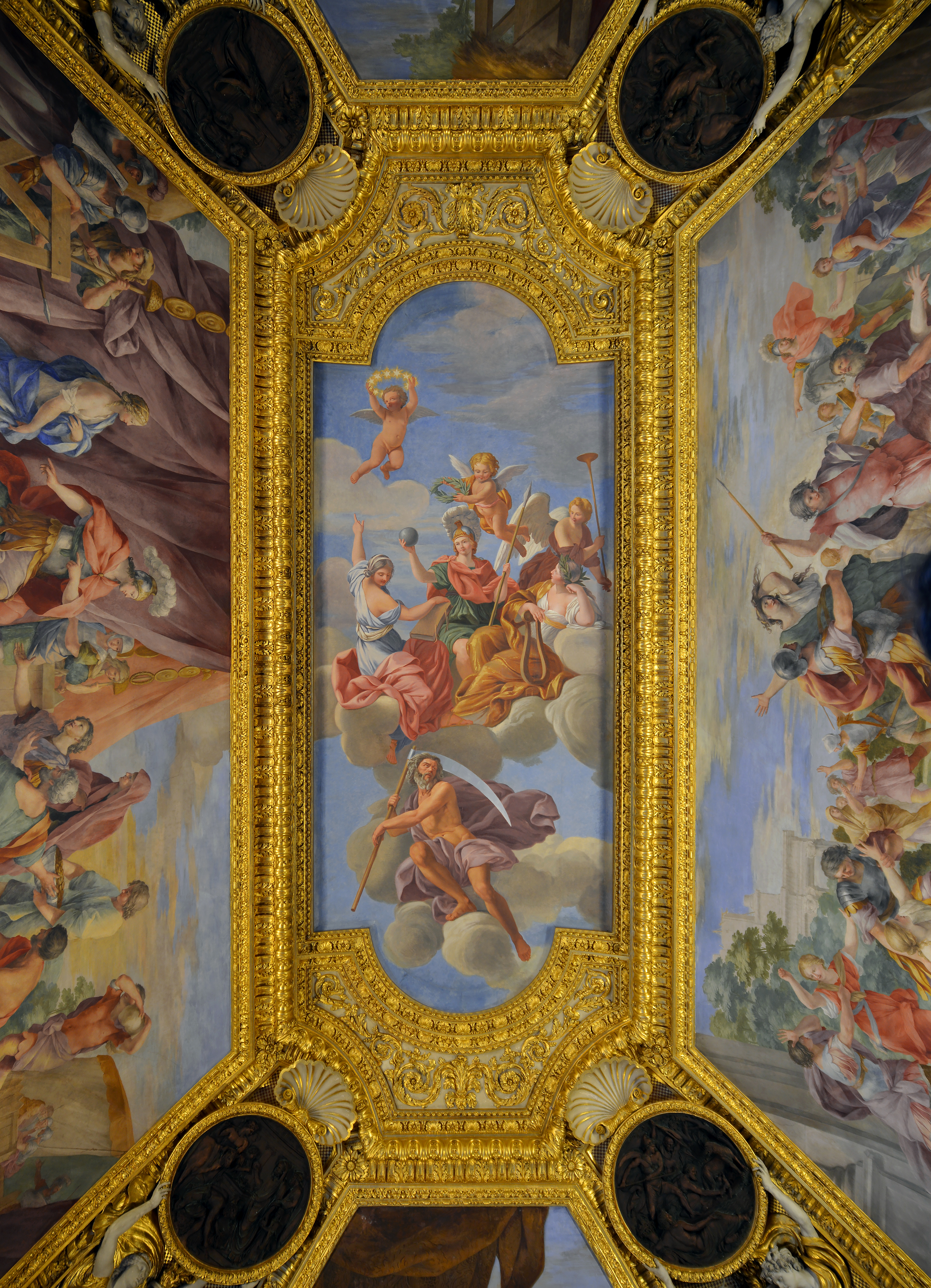
Ceiling in the Louvre Palace in quadro riportato style

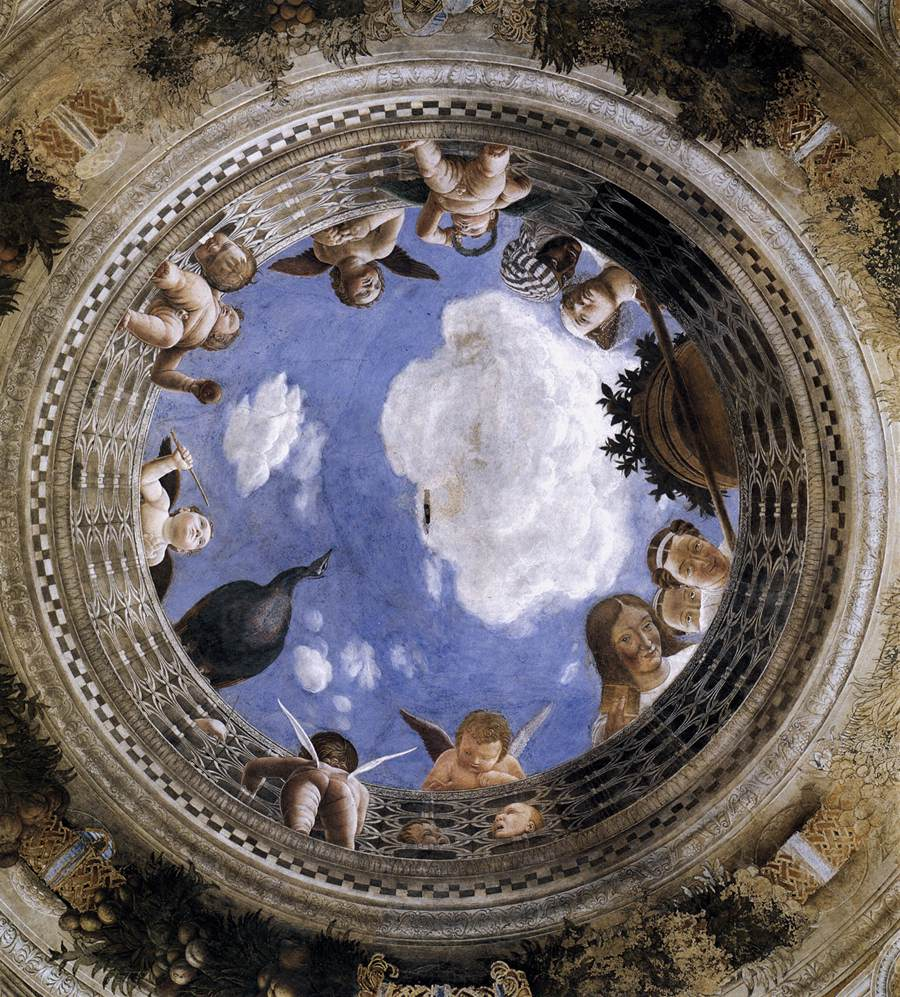
Andrea Mantegna's late-Quattrocento ceiling fresco in the Camera degli Sposi (commissioned by Ludovico III Gonzaga for Mantua's Ducal Palace) is an early example of illusionistic ceiling painting.

A painted ceiling is a ceiling covered with an artistic mural or painting. They are usually decorated with frescos or sometimes oil paintings. While hard to execute (at least in situ) a decorated ceiling has the advantage that it is largely protected from damage by fingers and dust. In the past, however, this was more than compensated for by the damage from smoke from candles or a fireplace. Many historic buildings have celebrated ceilings. Perhaps the most famous in the world is the Sistine Chapel ceiling by Michelangelo.

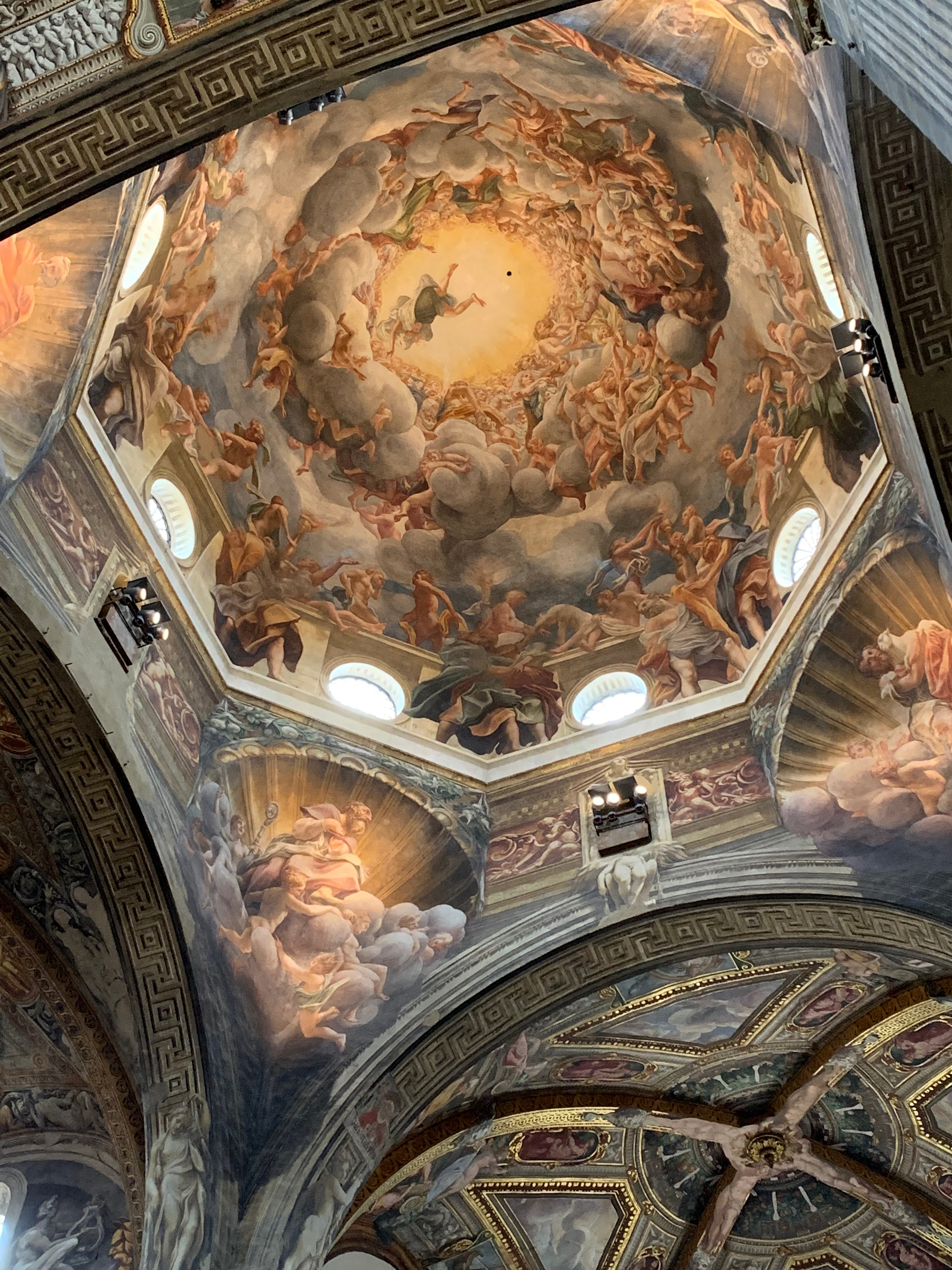
Illusionistic cupola fresco of the Assumption by Antonio da Correggio in Parma Cathedral

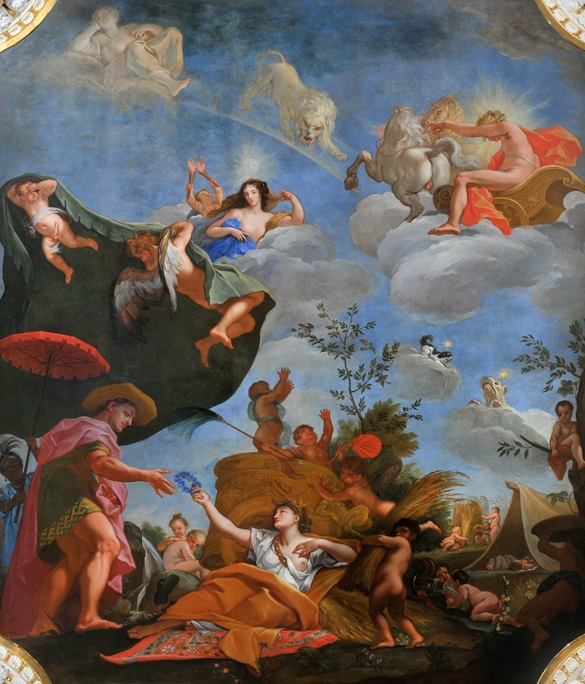
Allegory of Summer by Jerzy Siemiginowski-Eleuter, 1684–86, oil on canvas and panel, Wilanów Palace, Warsaw

An illusionistic ceiling painting is an ambitious work which attempts to give the illusion that there is an opening to the sky, in a single large picture space. These are typical of Baroque architecture, in churches and palaces, but the Villa Farnesina in Rome, built by 1510 for the Pope's banker, pioneered this style in the Sale delle Colonne ("Room of the Columns"), as well as having a round painted vault ceiling by Raphael in another room. Earlier examples include a small round section of a ceiling by Andrea Mantegna in the Camera degli Sposi of the Ducal Palace, Mantua, from 1474. The dome of Parma Cathedral by Correggio (1526-30) depicted an Assumption of the Virgin Mary, with many figures very foreshortened, introducing the apotheosis type of composition, showing the main figure moving up into the heavens. These became widely used, for Assumptions and Ascensions, but also for a number of saints, and later secular figures. The Triumph of the Name of Jesus by Giovanni Battista Gaulli in the Church of the Gesù in Rome is a famous 17th-century example in fresco. The Allegory of Divine Providence and Barberini Power by Pietro da Cortona (1630s) in the Palazzo Barberini in Rome essentially celebrates the election of the family's Pope Urban VIII.

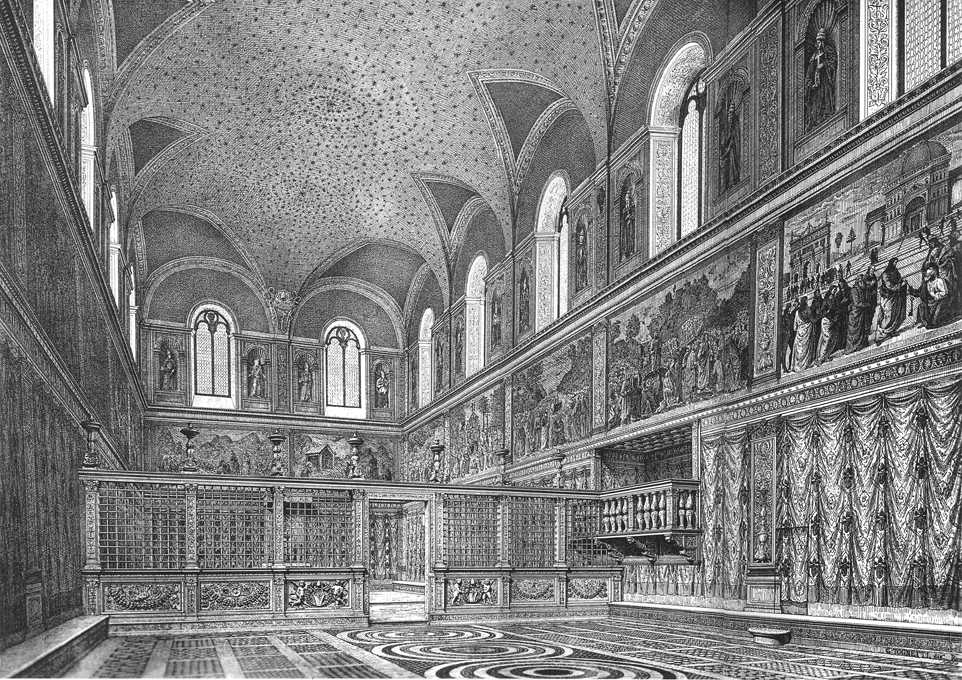
Reconstruction of the Sistine Chapel in the 1480s, before Michelangelo

Other ceilings are painted without any attempt to create an illusion of the composition receding upwards, with a variety of subjects. Coffered ceilings, flat or barrel-vaulted, are typically painted with small motifs in each coffer, a style that goes back to at least the Early Middle Ages in large flat roofs over church naves. The style was especially popular in Iberia, where it is called artesonado. Most Scottish Renaissance painted ceilings are of this type, and the ceilings of the Natural History Museum, London are painted with carefully accurate plant or animal subjects, in a Romanesque Revival building. A common style, used in the Sistine Chapel before Michelangelo's project, was a deep blue with gold stars, representing the night sky. Most of the ceiling of the Scrovegni Chapel is in this style; the walls are painted by Giotto.

An important monumental fresco cycle on a barrel vault is The Loves of the Gods by the Bolognese artist Annibale Carracci and his studio, in the Palazzo Farnese, now the French Embassy, in Rome. Drawing on the Farnese collection of ancient sculpture for many of its poses, it marked the transition from Late Renaissance Mannerism to Baroque. A number of different scenes are shown in their own frames, a style called quadro riportato.

In some Central European languages plafond, the normal French language word for a ceiling, whether painted or otherwise, is used specifically for painted ceilings. This usage sometimes appears in material translated into English from Polish or German, but it is not correct in English.
