= Jerzy Siemiginowski-Eleuter =

Polish painter and engraver (1660–c. 1711)

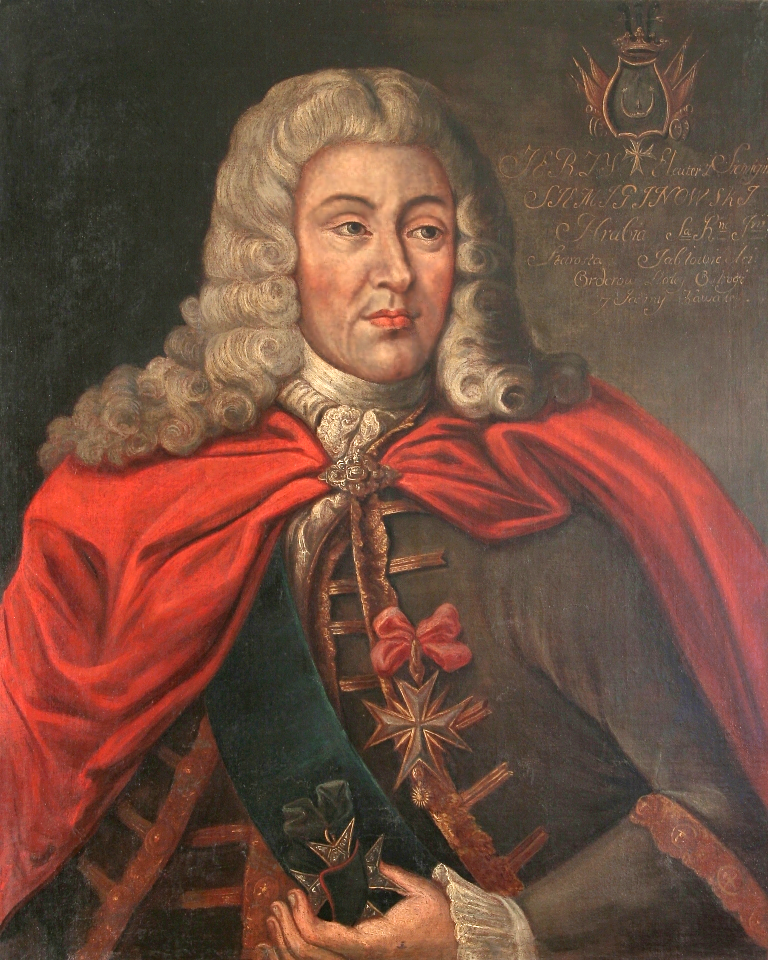
- Born: Jerzy Szymonowicz c. 1660; Lwów, Polish–Lithuanian Commonwealth
- Died: c. 1711; Lwów, Polish–Lithuanian Commonwealth
- Known for: painting, engraving
- Movement: Baroque
- Patrons: John III Sobieski

Jerzy Siemiginowski-Eleuter (born Jerzy Szymonowicz; c. 1660 – c. 1711) was a prominent Polish painter and engraver of the Baroque era. He was court painter to king John III Sobieski and a Polish–Lithuanian noble. He is considered one of the most accomplished painters of Classical Baroque in Poland. His works combine the classical approach with native elements.

== Life and professional career ==
Siemiginowski was of Armenian origin. He was born in Lwów (Lviv) in the Polish–Lithuanian Commonwealth (today part of Ukraine) and was the son of a painter Jerzy Szymonowicz and Teodozja née Korunka. In 1677, he was entrusted to king John III Sobieski by his parents and was sent by the king to study at the Accademia di San Luca in Rome. Before he went to Rome he probably spent at least a year, possibly two, in Paris. In Rome, he was trained by Lazzaro Baldi, Luigi Garzi and Carlo Maratta. On 11 January 1682 he won an Accademia di San Luca contest with a set of two drawings: Construction of the Tower of Babel and God's anger caused by the building of the tower, and in September of that year was admitted to the Academy as a member. While in Rome, he received the Knighthood of the Golden Spur and the title of Eques Auratus from Pope Innocent XI, and remained under the protecteion of the Pope's nephew Livio Odescalchi.

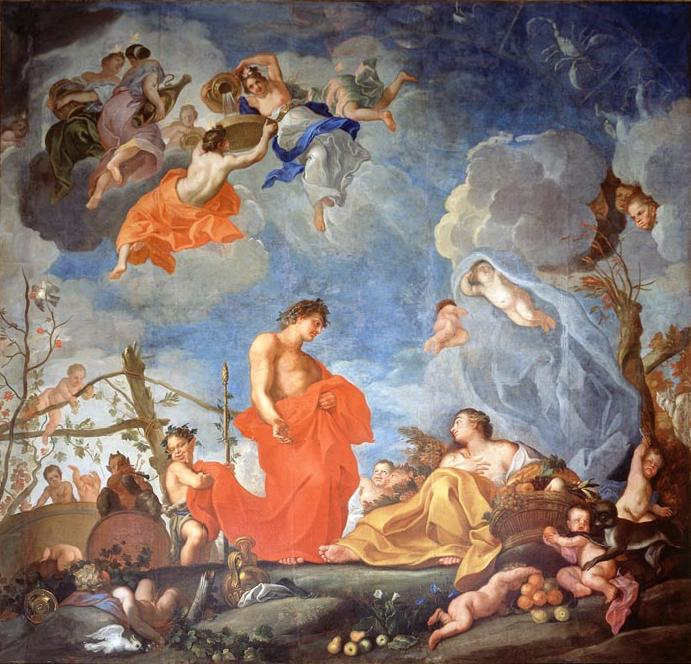
Plafond Allegory of Autumn, 1681-1682

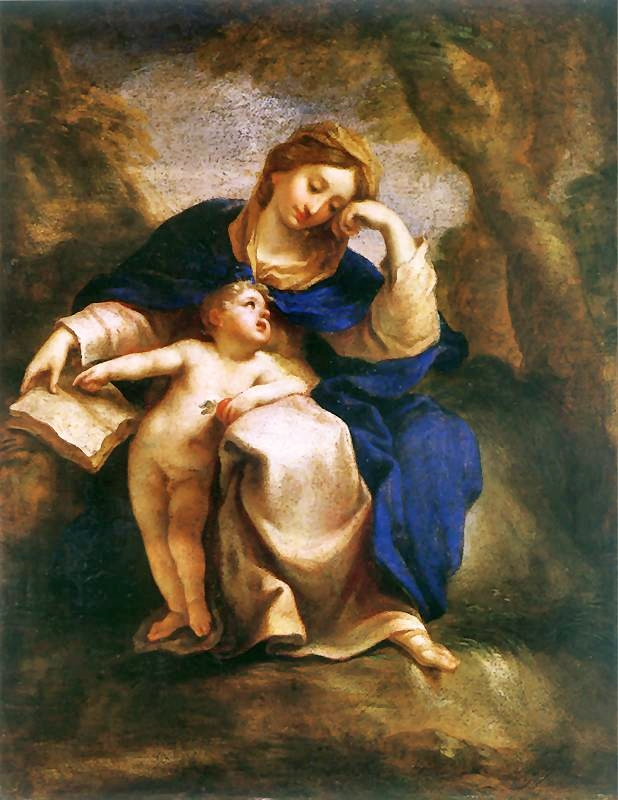
Madonna and Child, between 1680 and 1685

Shortly after his return to Poland in 1684 he was ennobled by the king and took the name Eleuter (Greek for free, independent). In 1687 the king granted him the village Łuka near Złoczów (Zolochiv) to confirm his nobility. After king John's death he became secretary to king Augustus II the Strong and was court painter to Aleksander Benedykt Sobieski. At that time he still worked at the Wilanów (Sobieski's suburban palace) and supervised the construction of new palace wings. In 1701, he was adopted by the impoverished Siemiginowski noble family (he paid them a substantial sum for the privilege) and since that time he used their name. Siemiginowski was married four times and had 11 children. In 1704, he had a house in Warsaw and a manor house at Wielopole near Warsaw. He died probably between February 28, 1708, and March 13, 1711.

Siemiginowski-Eleuter was the chief artist responsible for the decoration of the interior of the Wilanów Palace near Warsaw. His painting style was heavily influenced by French artists of the Baroque. Similarities with plafonds by Charles Le Brun in his works (especially the ceiling painting in the Pavillon de l'Aurore in the suburban Paris residence of Jean-Baptiste Colbert at Sceaux, 1671 or 1672) making his visit to Paris more probable. Influences of Carlo Maratta and Nicolas Poussin are also visible in his works (especially in his plafond Allegory of Spring in the Queen's Bedroom inspired by Maratta's Flora and Changes in the Kingdom of Flora by Poussin). He painted classicised portraits of members of the royal family and made engravings, including in collaboration with Charles de La Haye. Siemiginowski painted many frescoes, notable for their use of color. His subject ranged from dramatic scenes to peaceful landscapes. Among the most notable of his works are four plafonds of the four seasons in the Wilanów Palace. Siemiginowski established his own school of painting in Wilanów and was a renowned architect (co-designer of the Town Hall in Żółkiew (Zhovkva) among others). Many of his religious paintings in Warsaw (Crucifixion in the Holy Cross Church, Transfiguration in the Capuchin Church among others) were destroyed during the extensive bombardment of the city by the Germans in 1944.

== Bibliography ==
- Fijałkowski, Wojciech (1983), Wilanów. Rezydencja Króla Zwycięzcy (Wilanów. The residence of the Victorious King) (in Polish), Warsaw: Krajowa Agencja Wydawnicza.

== Works in Wilanów Palace ==
=== Ceiling paintings ===
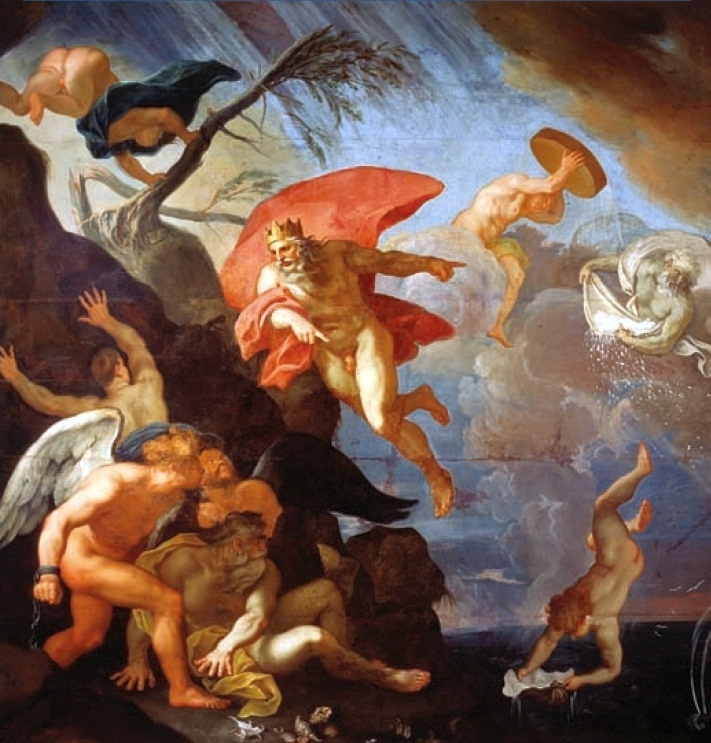
Allegory of Winter, 1683

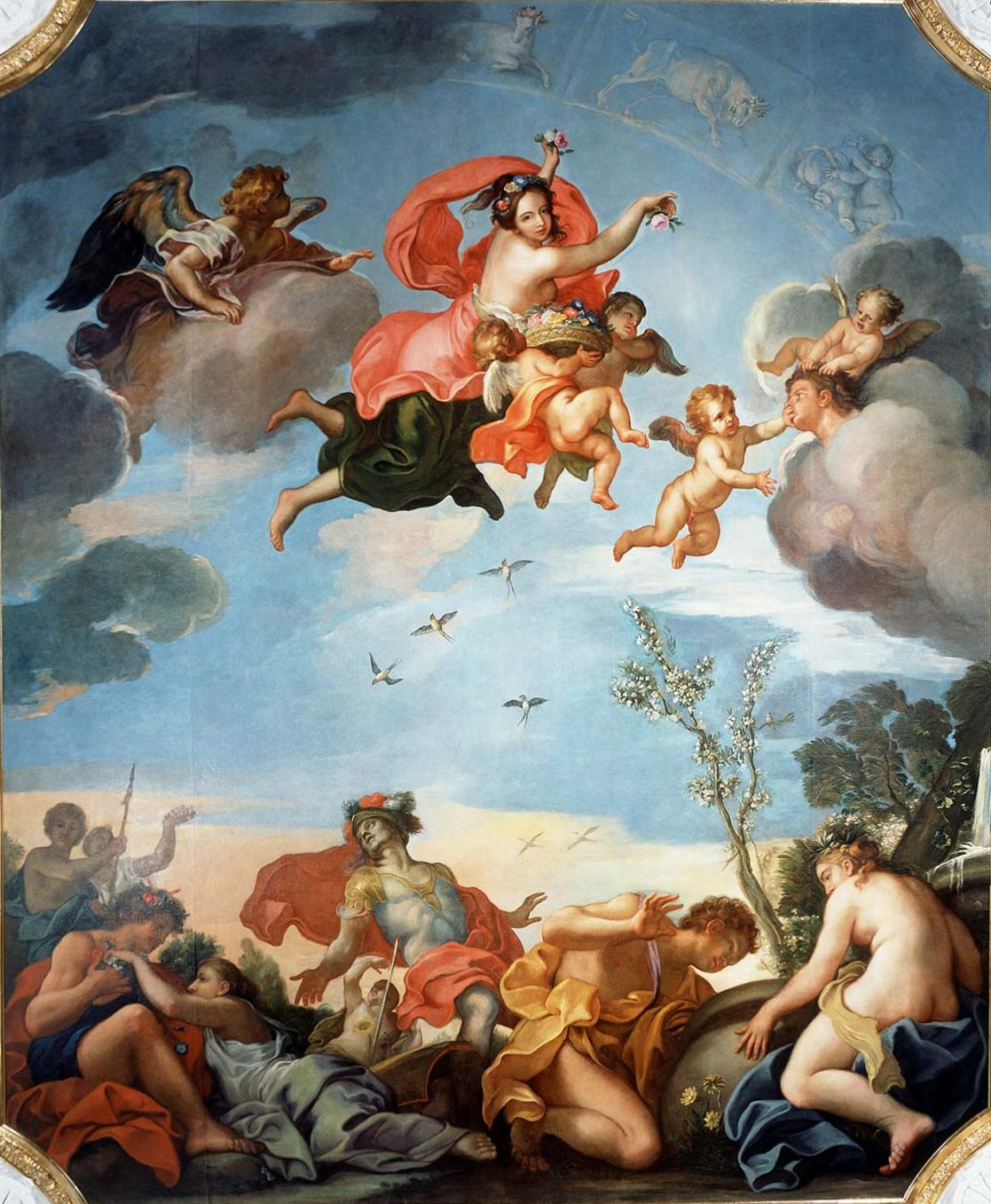
Allegory of Spring, 1680s

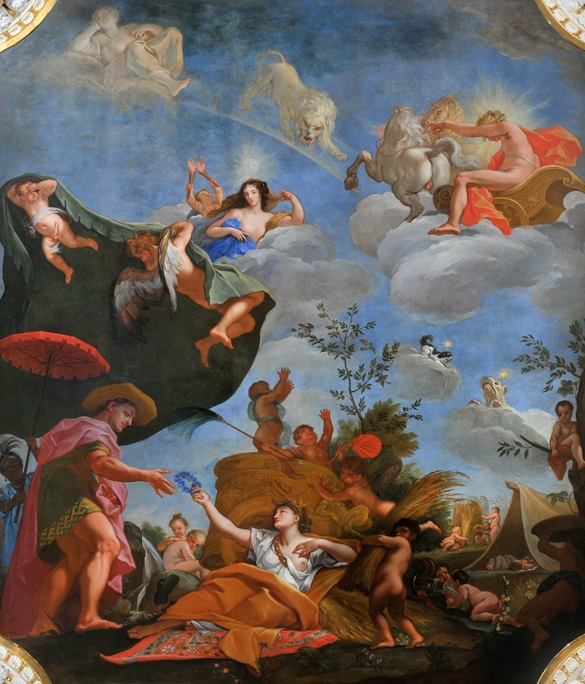
Allegory of Summer, 1684−1686

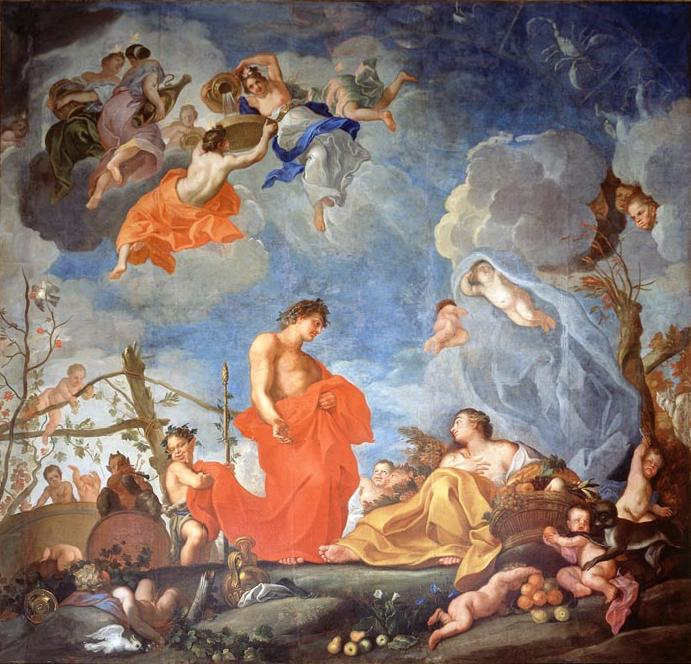
Allegory of Autumn, between 1681−1682

=== Portraits ===
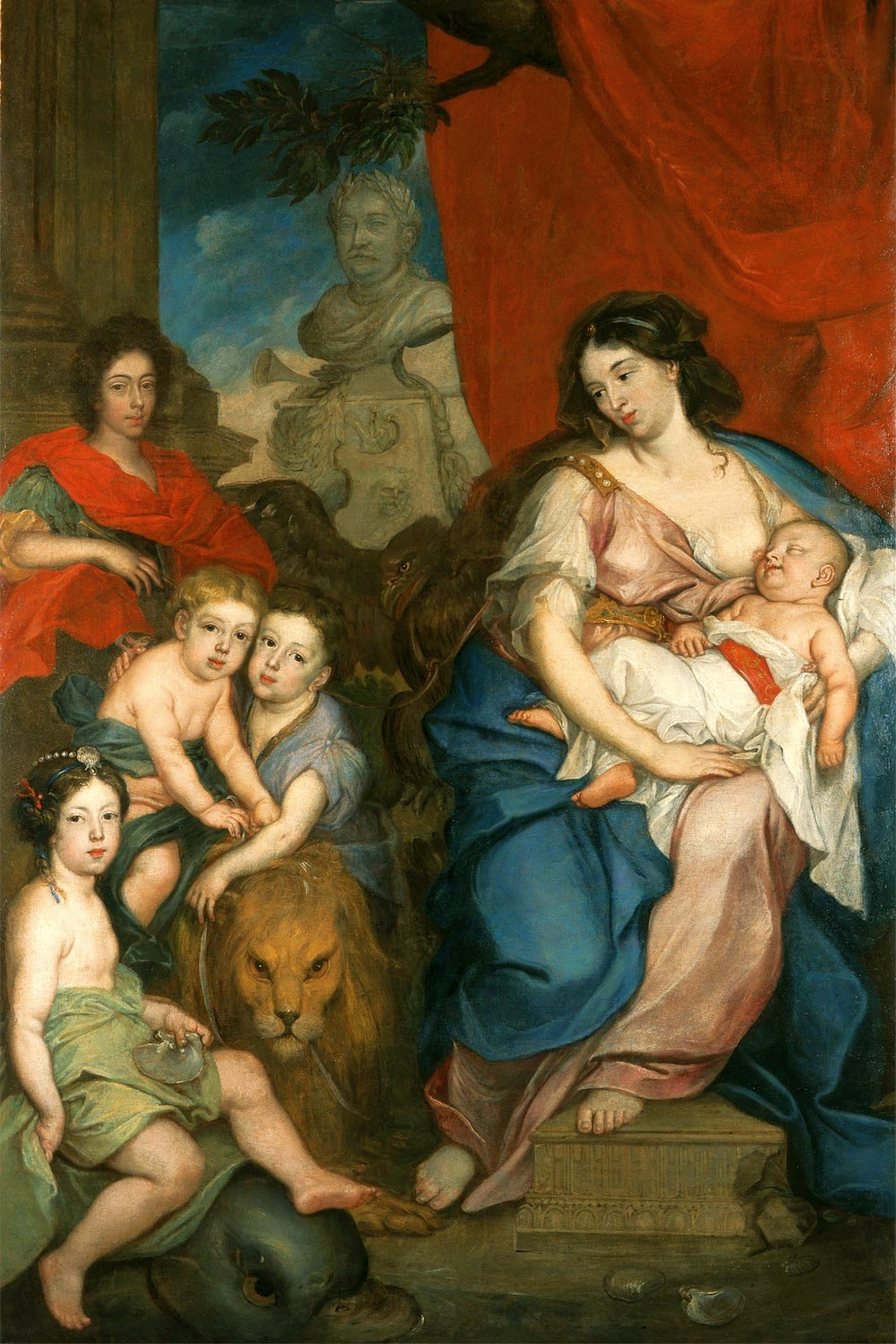
Queen Marie Casimire with children, 1684

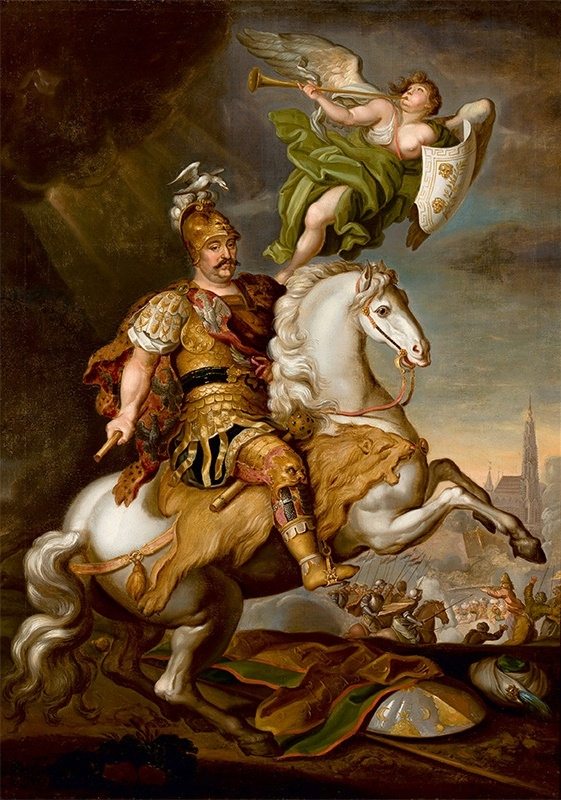
John III Sobieski at the Battle of Vienna, 1686

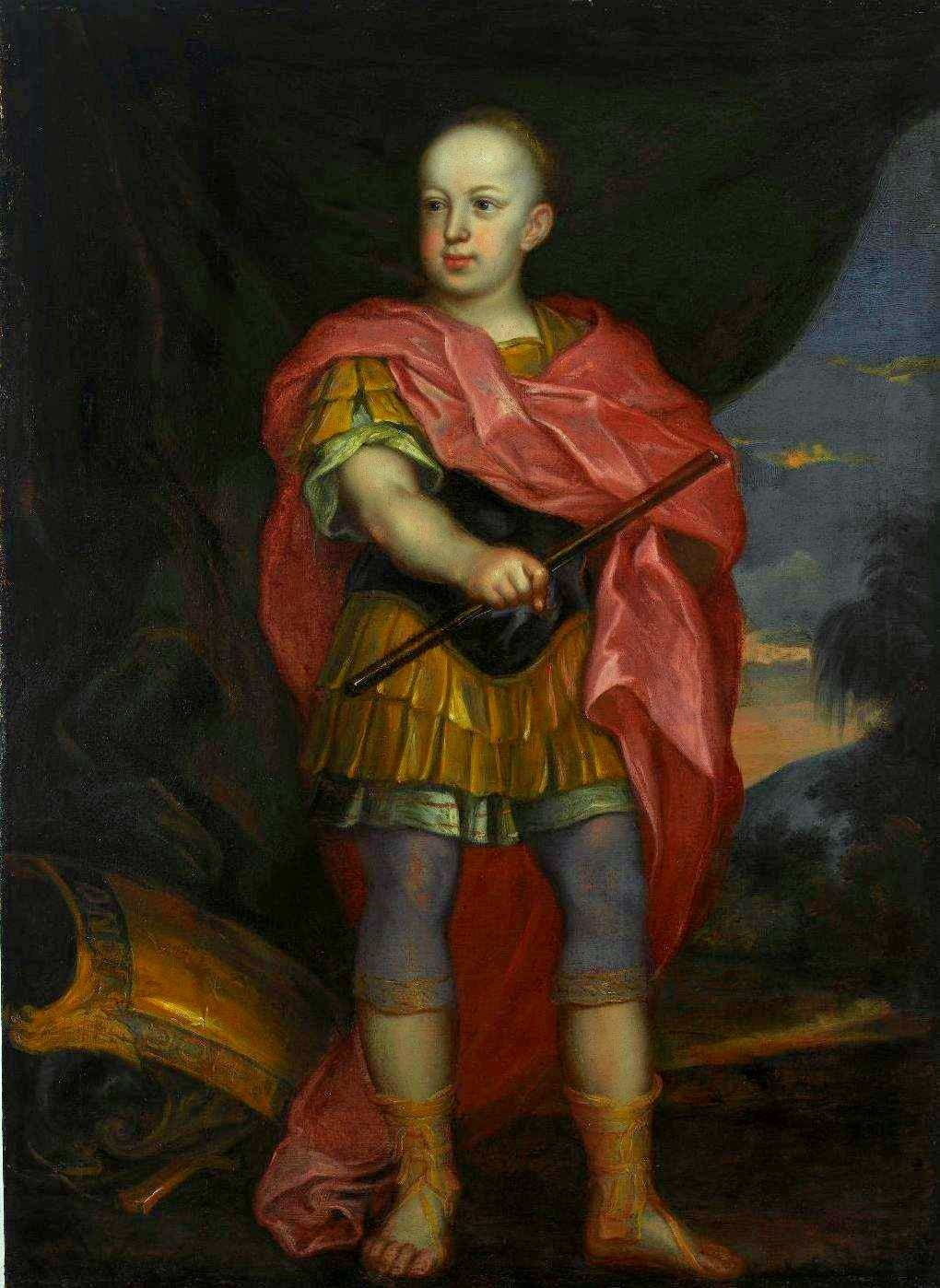
Konstanty Władysław Sobieski, c. 1690
