= Association of the Royal Residences of Europe =

The Network of European Royal Residences, founded in 2001, comprises the major institutions in charge of managing the most prestigious palace-museums across Europe. This unique network in Europe allows its members to share their experiences and best practices related to the knowledge, preservation and enhancement of the rich cultural heritage entrusted to them, for the benefit of the millions of visitors they receive each year. Its activities include professional training, establishing partnerships, promotional activities and joint projects and publications.

The network was created in 1996 upon the initiative of the Château de Versailles, but has been registered as an Association since 2001. Each year the Network organises a range of activities for its members, consisting of Technical Meetings, a Mobility Grants Programme, joint projects, conferences, and the General Assembly.

Following a Technical Meeting in 2015, the Network founded the #PalaceDay, which takes place every year on the 19th of July.

== 36 members ==
- Schloss Schönbrunn Kultur- und Betriebsges.m.b.H., Austria
- Schloss Eggenberg, Austria
- Stiftung Preussische Schlösser und Gärten Berlin-Brandenburg, Germany
- Staatliche Schlösser, Burgen und Gärten Sachsen, Germany
- Kulturstiftung Dessau-Wörlitz, Germany
- Den Kongelige Samling, Denmark
- Slots- og Kulturstyrelsen, Denmark
- Frederiksborg Nationalhistorisk Museum, Denmark
- Patrimonio Nacional, Spain
- Alhambra y Generalife, Spain
- Château de Versailles, France
- Domaine national de Chambord, France
- Château de Compiègne, France
- Château de Fontainebleau, France
- Gödöllői Királyi Kastély Kht, Hungary
- A Budavári Palotanegyed, Hungary
- Consorzio Residenze Reali Saubaude, Italy
- Musei Reali Torino, Italy
- Reggia di Caserta, Italy
- Reggia di Monza, Italy
- Museo Storico e Il Parco del Castello di Miramare, Italy
- Palazzo Reale Napoli, Italy
- Palazzo Reale Milano, Italy
- Reggia di Colorno, Italy
- Le Gallerie degli Uffizi, Italy
- Reggia di Carditello, Italy
- Rundāles pils muzejs, Latvia
- Palais Princier de Monaco, Monaco
- Paleis Het Loo, The Netherlands
- Muzeum Pałac w Wilanowie, Poland
- Zamek Królewski w Warszawie, Poland
- Łazienki Królewskie, Poland
- Zamek Królewski na Wawelu – Państwowe Zbiory Sztuki, Poland
- Palácio Nacional de Mafra, Portugal
- Parques de Sintra - Monte da Lua, Portugal
- Historic Royal Palaces, United Kingdom

== Website ==
- https://www.europeanroyalresidences.eu/
