= St. Anne Collegiate Church =

Roman Catholic church in Warsaw, Poland

Coordinates: 52°09′58″N 21°05′15″E

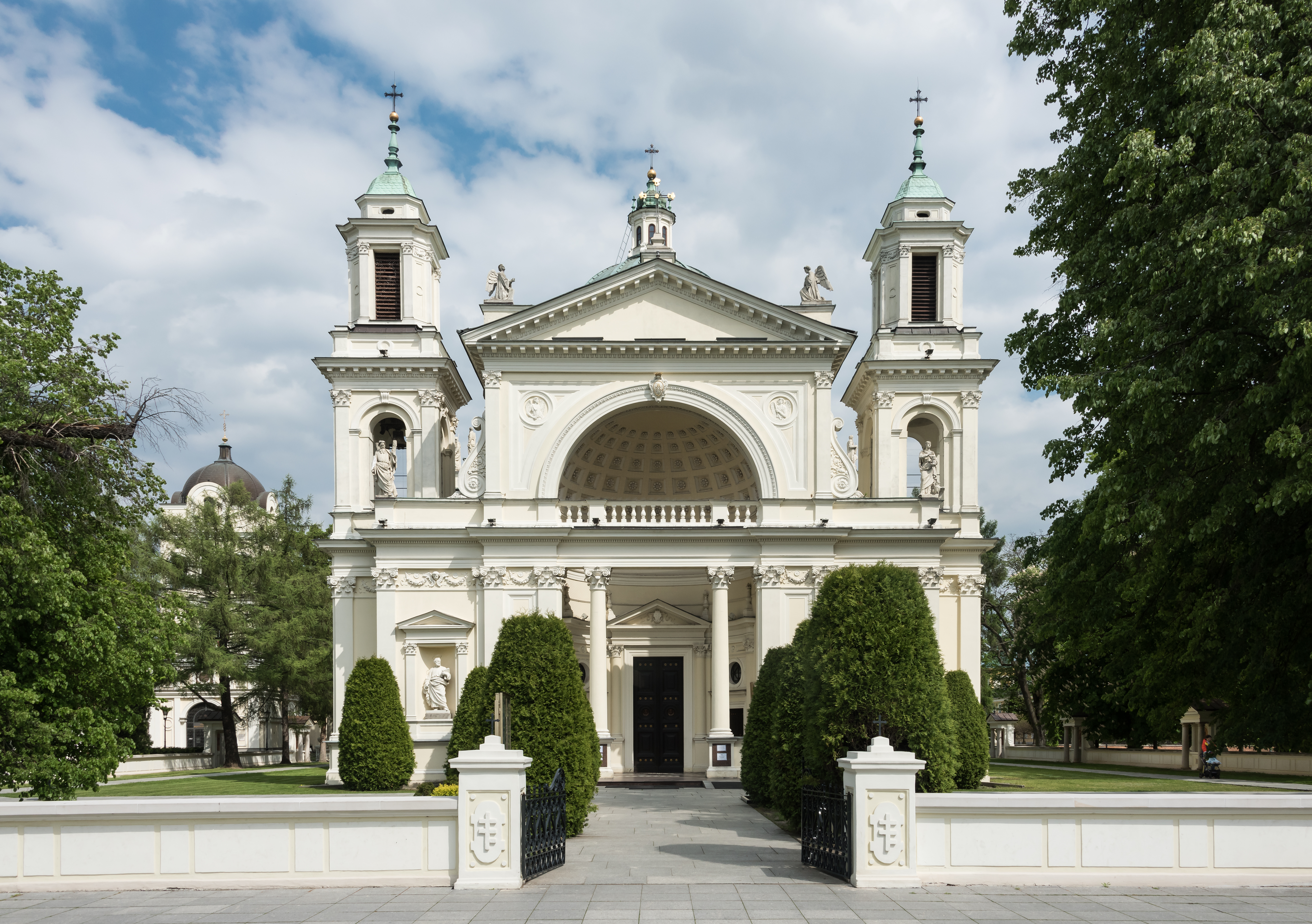
- The front of the St. Anne Collegiate Church in 2020.

- Location in Warsaw, Poland
- Location: 1 Kolegiacka Street, Wilanów, Warsaw
- Country: Poland
- Denomination: Roman Catholic
- Website: parafiawilanow.pl

History
- Status: Active
- Founded: 1775 (original); 1870 (redesign)
- Founder: August Aleksander Czartoryski
- Dedication: Saint Anne
- Dedicated: 1884
- Consecrated: 1775 (original); 1870 (redesign)

Architecture
- Functional status: Collegiate church; Parish church
- Architects: Jan Kotelnicki (original); Enrico Marconi (redesign)
- Style: Renaissance Revival
- Groundbreaking: 1772 (original); 1857 (redesign)

Administration
- Archdiocese: Warsaw
- Deanery: Wilanów
- Parish: St. Anne

The St. Anne Collegiate Church (Polish: Kolegiata św. Anny), until 1998 known as the St. Anne Church (Polish: Kościół św. Anny), is a Renaissance Revival Roman Catholic collegiate and parish church in Warsaw, Poland, within the Wilanów district at 1 Kolegiacka Street. It is the seat of the Parish of Saint Anne, who, according to the Christian tradition, was the mother of Mary of Nazareth, and maternal grandmother of Jesus Christ.

The Roman Catholic parish was present in Wilanów from the 13th century, originally named after Saint Nicholas, and since 16th century, after Saint Nicholas and Saint Anne. In the 17th century, the St. Leonard Church, was built in the current location, as a wooden structure. It was replaced by the St. Anne Church, which was constructed from bricks between 1772 and 1775. It was designed by Jan Kotelnicki, and funded by August Aleksander Czartoryski, a nobleman, politician, military officer and owner of the Wilanów Estate. The church was rebuilt and expanded between 1857 and 1870 in the Renaissance Revival style. The new building was designed by Enrico Marconi, in cooperation with Leonard Marconi and Jan Huss, and commissioned by Aleksandra Potocka and August Potocki, the owners of the Wilanów Estate. It was consecrated in 1880, and dedicated in 1884. The building was damaged during the First and Second World Wars, and restored in the 1980s. In 1998, it was elevated to the status of a collegiate church.

== History ==
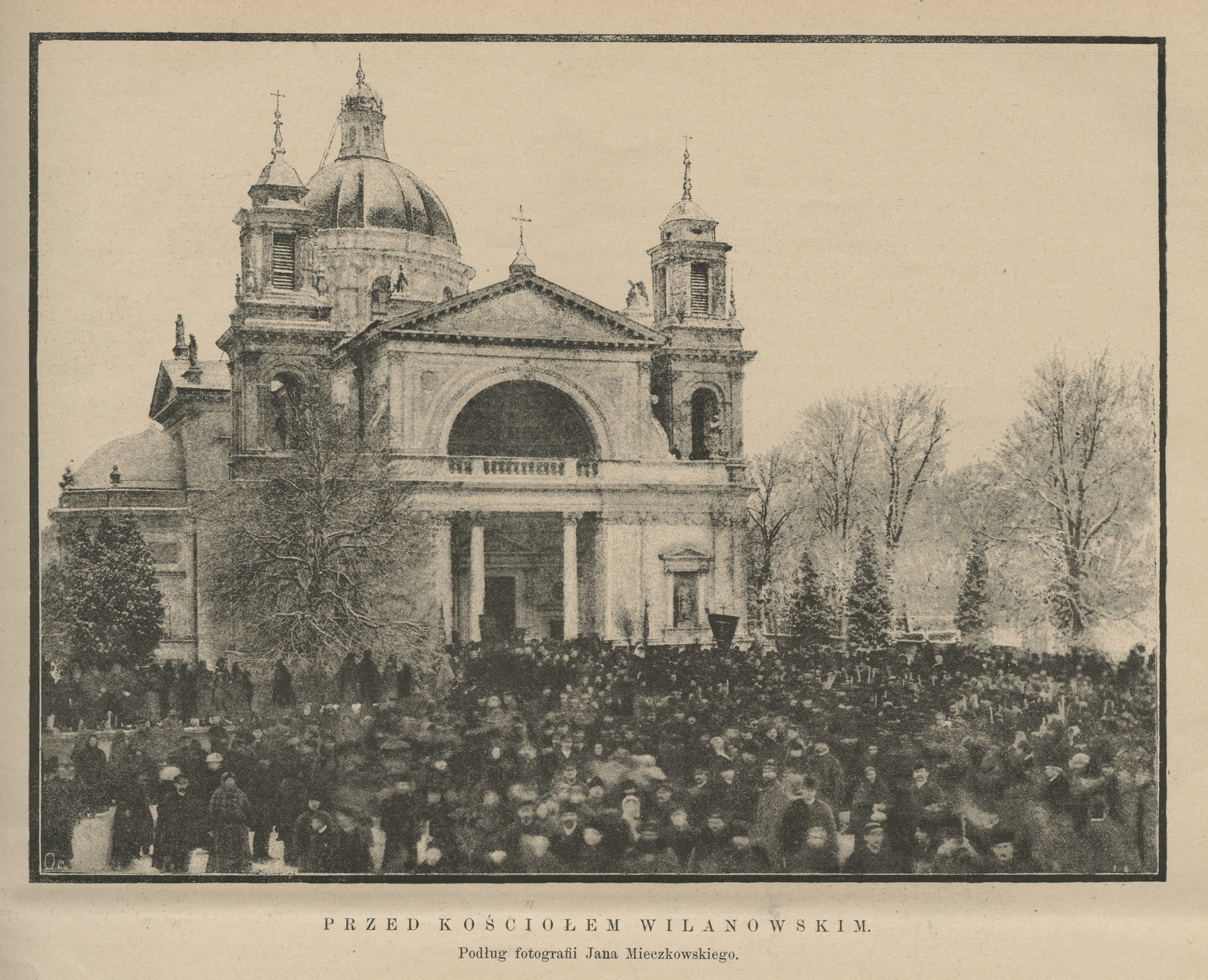
The St. Anne Church in 1892.

In the 13th century, the Roman Catholic Parish of St. Nicholas was founded in the area of the village of Milanów (later renamed to Wilanów). It was named after Saint Nicholas, a 3rd- and 4th-century Early Christian bishop from Patara in Turkey, with numerous miracles attributed to him. In the 14th century, a wooden Roman Catholic church, known as the St. Leonard Church, was built in the village. Its construction was funded by the Benedictine abbey in Płock. By the 15th century, the parish also included the nearby settlements of Kępa Zawadowska, Okrzeszyn, Narty, Powsinek, and Zawady. In the 16th century, the church was replaced by a new wooden Gothic building, and a bell tower, after the previous burned down. In the second half of the 15th century, the parish was named after both Saint Nicolas and Saint Anne, who, according to the Christian tradition, was the mother of Mary of Nazareth, and maternal grandmother of Jesus Christ. In the second half of the 17th century, as the Wilanów Palace was constructed nearby, between 1681 and 1696, the church was moved from the current location of the Wilanów Gardens, to the foregrounds of the palace. The former wooden church was replaced by the St. Anne Church, which was constructed from bricks between 1772 and 1775. It was designed by Jan Kotelnicki, and funded by August Aleksander Czartoryski, a nobleman, politician, military officer and owner of the Wilanów Estate. During its construction, a mammoth bone was excavated in 1770, and remains displayed inside the building to the current day. Between 1799 and 1831, numerous religious art objects were moved to the church by Aleksandra Potocka (1760–1836), from her family's castle in Wiśnicz. Among them was a 17th-century painting The Annunciation of the Blessed Virgin Mary from Italy. A cemetery, bell tower and clergy house, were also built next to the church.

The church was rebuilt and expanded between 1857 and 1870 in the Renaissance Revival style. The new building was designed by Enrico Marconi, in cooperation with Leonard Marconi and Jan Huss, and commissioned by Aleksandra Potocka and August Potocki, the owners of the Wilanów Estate. The building was expanded with a dome with a transept at its base, and two additional chapels, named after Mary of Nazareth and Saint Anne. The wall paintings and frescos inside the building were created by Antoni Kolberg, while, marble statues of Jesus Christ and angels, as well as a relief, were sculptured by Henryk Statler. Reliefs and sculptures on the façade were made several artists. The original chapel, named after the Potocki family, was decorated with the paining Our Lady of Grace by Leopold Kupelwieser. Underneath it is also located a crypt with the sarcophaguses of the Potocki and Branicki families. The neighboring churchyard was surrounded with a brick wall decorated with fourteen small chapel booths depicting the Stations of the Cross, designed by Enrico Marconi and created between 1857 and 1863. The church was consecrated in 1880, and dedicated in 1884 by Wincenty Teofil Popiel, the archbishop of Warsaw.

In 1816, a new commentary was founded to the northwest of the church. Between 1823 and 1826, a mausoleum chapel, designed by Chrystian Piotr Aigner, was built in its center. The cemetery was later expanded in around 1860, 1888, and at the turn of the 21st century.

The church was heavy damaged during the First World War. During the conflict, its dome was used as an observation post by Russian, and later Russian soldiers. In 1916, the Imperial German Army dismantled the church's copper roof, to melt it into materials. Its two bells were hidden by the local population inside its dome, to prevent their robbery. It was further damaged during the Second World War. It was stuck by several projectiles during the artillery bombardment during the siege of Warsaw in September 1939. It was additionally plundered by German soldiers while the city was under their occupation. In 1944, during the Warsaw Uprising, the building was used as a internment camp, mainly for people with higher education from Warsaw. Its insides were also devastated. To protect them from robbery, its two belles were again hidden inside of the church dome.

In 1965, it received the status of a protected cultural property. The renovation and restoration of the building begun in 1979. Its copper roof was also restored. On 16 October 1998, Józef Glemp, the primate of Poland, elevated its status to the collegiate church as the seat of the chapter of the deanery of Wilanów, known as the Divine Providence Chapter. On 25 October 2018, its seat was moved to the nearby Temple of Divine Providence.

== Characteristics ==
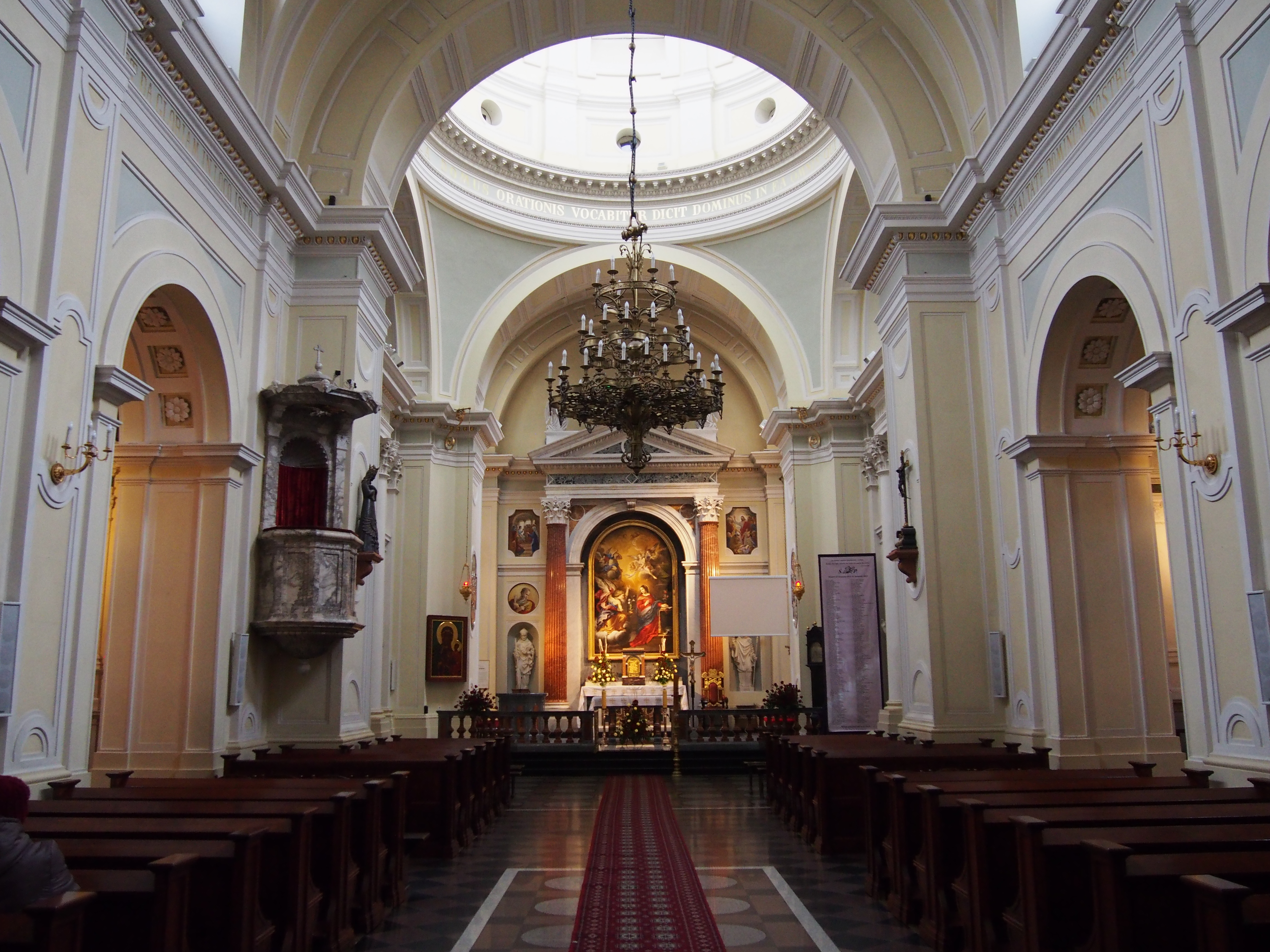
The church interior.

The Renaissance Revival church is a seat of the Roman Catholic Parish of Saint Anne, who, according to the Christian tradition, was the mother of Mary of Nazareth, and maternal grandmother of Jesus Christ. It features a dome with a transept at its base, and three chapels, named Potocki family, the Mary of Nazareth, and Saint Anne. Its façade is decorated with statues and reliefs made by various artists in the 19th century. In the inside, its walls are decorated by frescos by Antoni Kolberg, and marble statues of Jesus Christ and angels, as well as a relief, sculptured by Henryk Statler. It also features paintings such as The Annunciation of the Blessed Virgin Mary from the 17th century, and Our Lady of Grace by Leopold Kupelwieser from the 19th century. Its collection also features a mammoth bone displayed inside, which was excavated in 1770 during the early stages of its construction. Underneath the Potocki Chapel, it has a crypt with the sarcophaguses of the Potocki and Branicki families. Its churchyard is surrounded brick wall decorated with fourteen small chapel booths depicting the Stations of the Cross, designed by Enrico Marconi and created between 1857 and 1863. A Renaissance Revival bell tower, known as the Third Millennium Bell Tower, is also located next to the building. Additionally, a small-leaved lime tree grows outside the church, having the status of a natural monument.

== Gallery ==
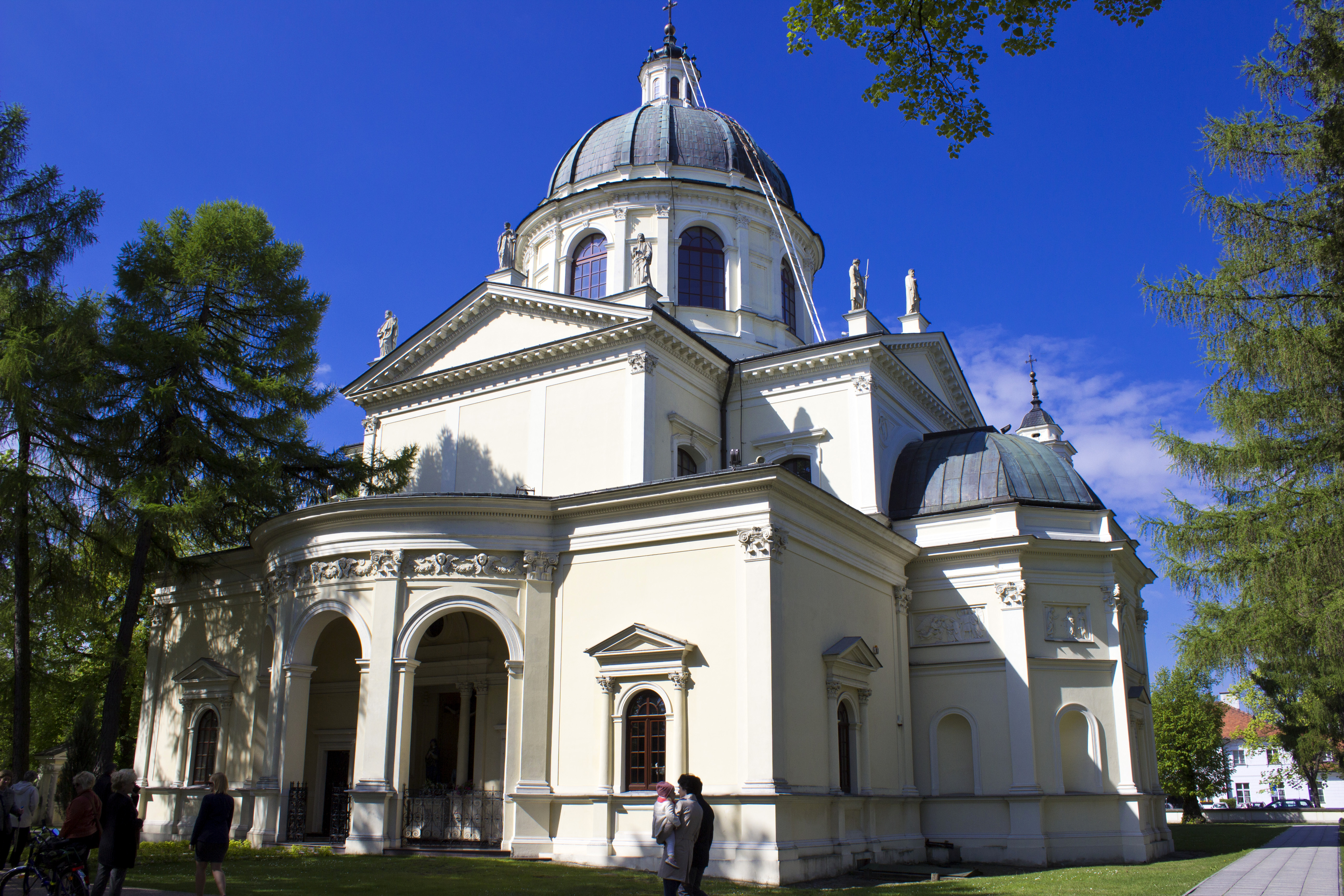
The backside of the church.

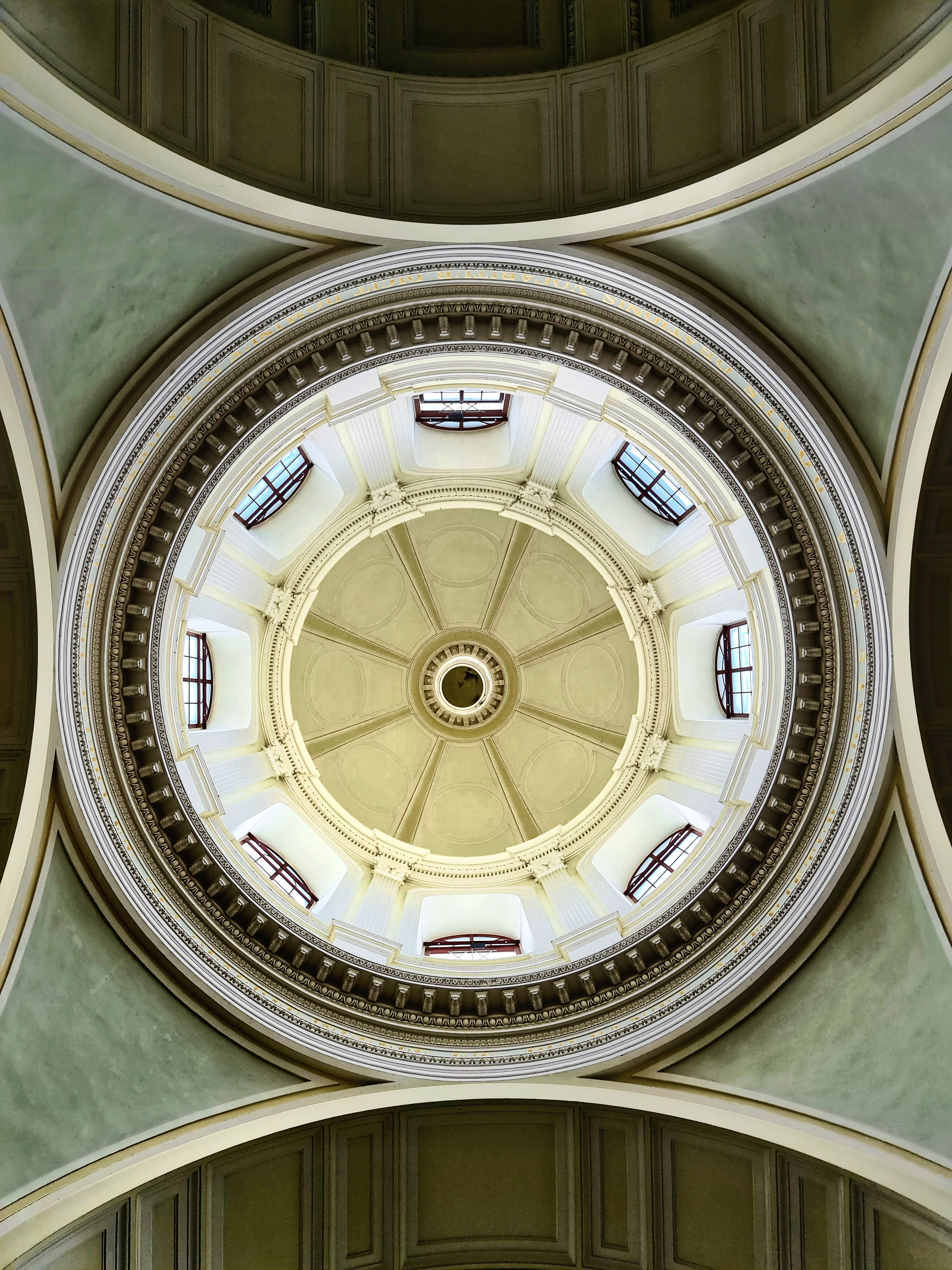
The inside of the dome.

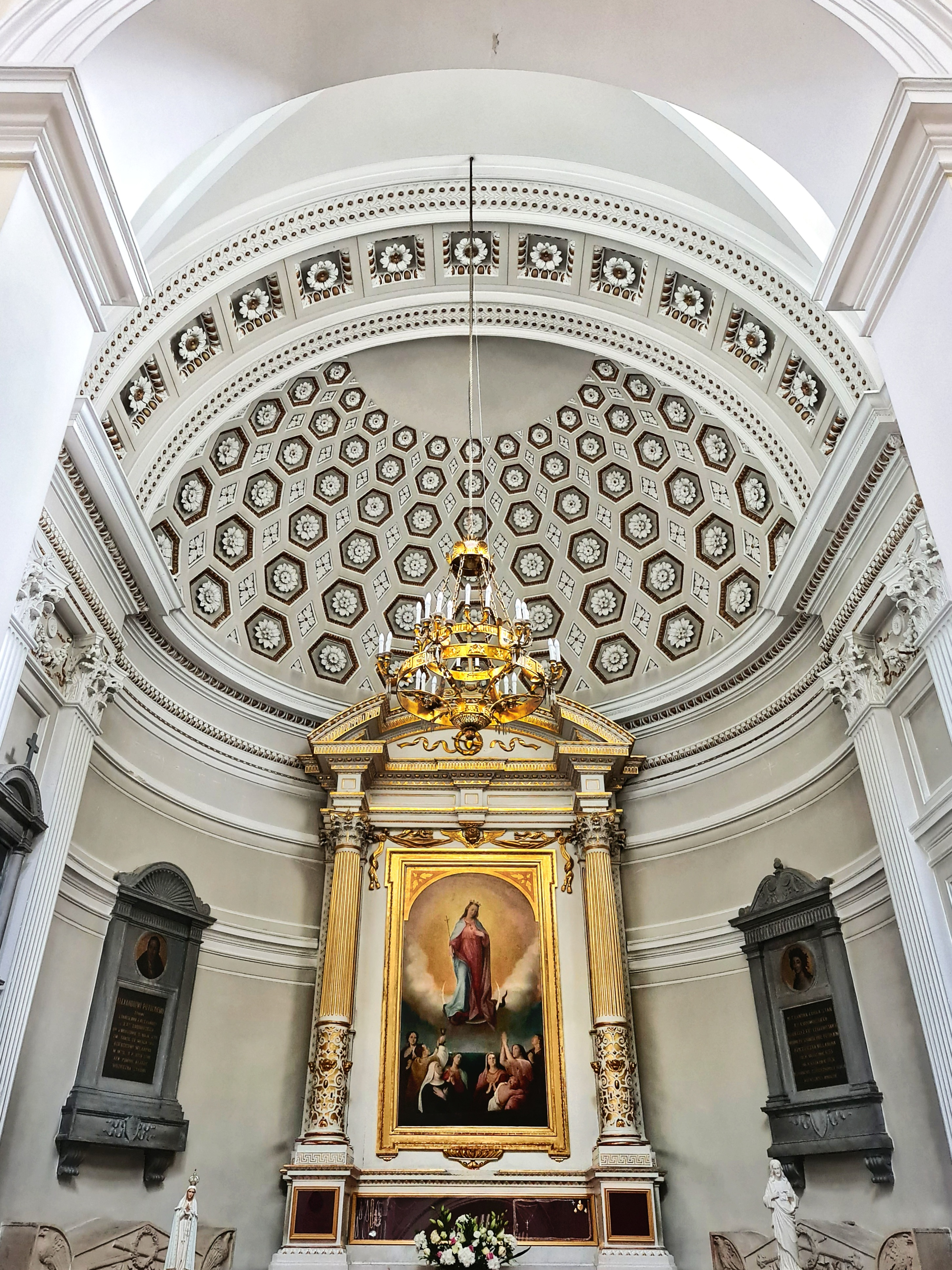
An altar inside the church.

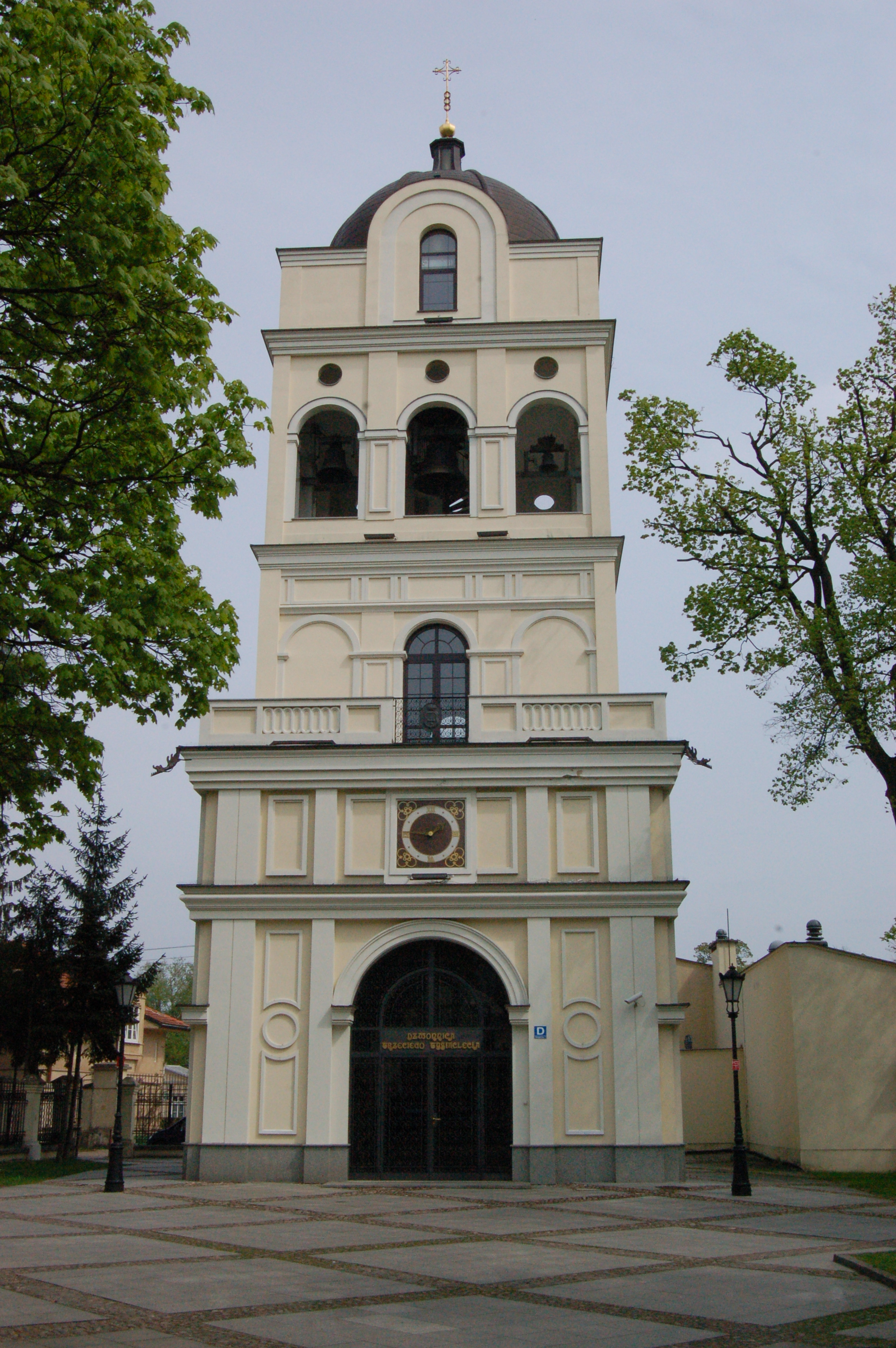
The Third Millennium Bell Tower.

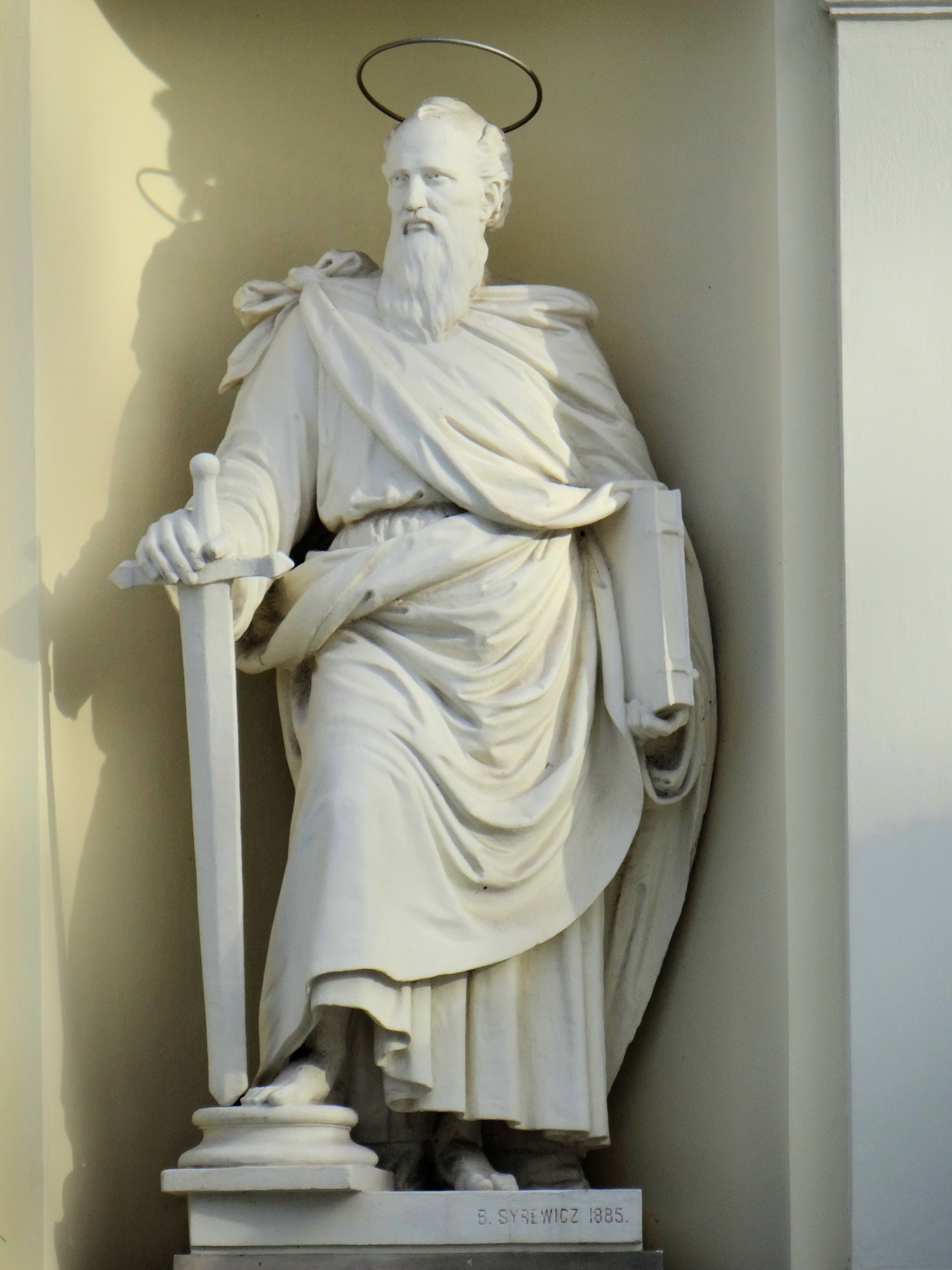
The statue of Paul the Apostle on the exterior.

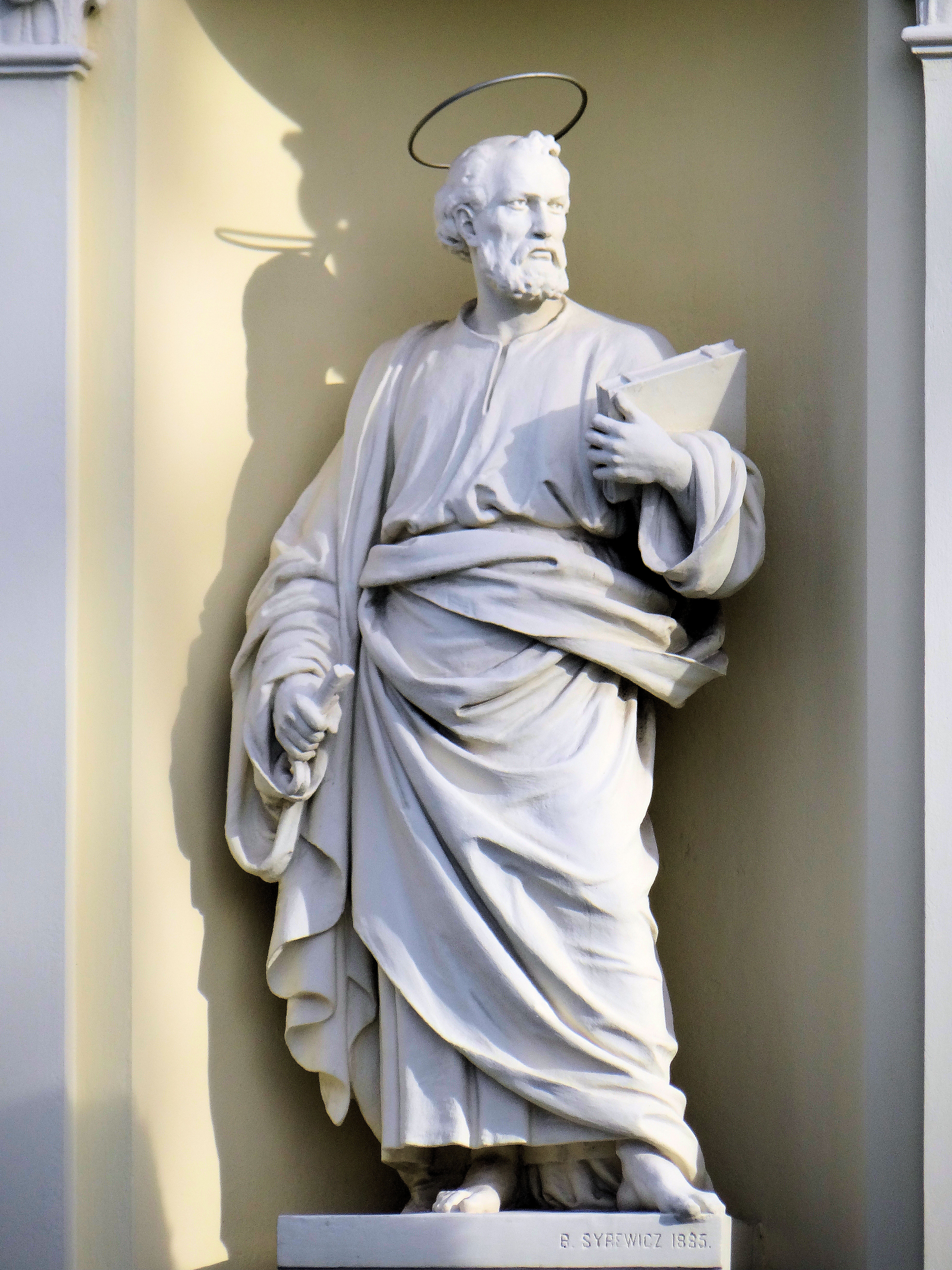
The statue of Saint Peter on the exterior.

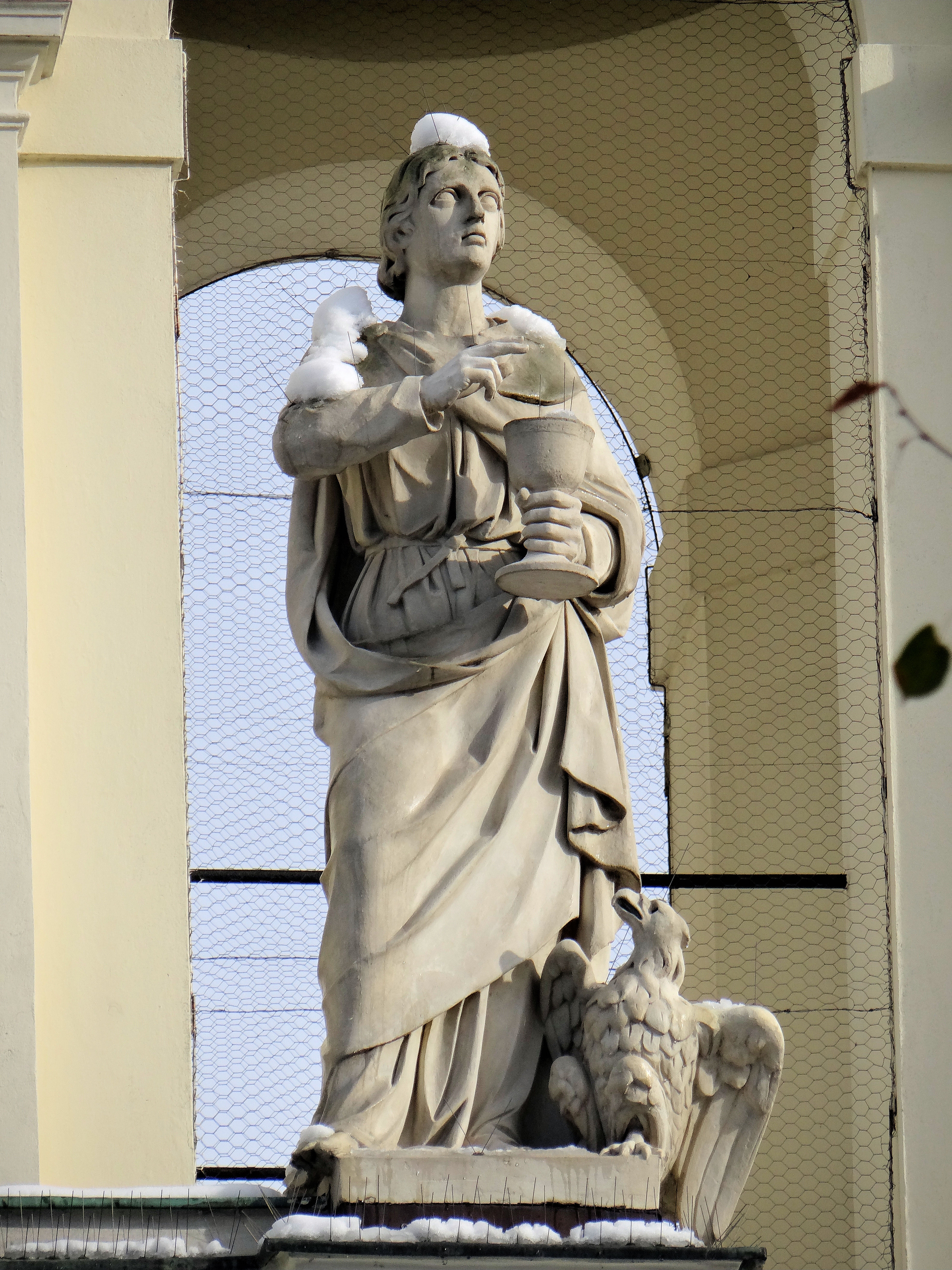
A statue on the exterior.

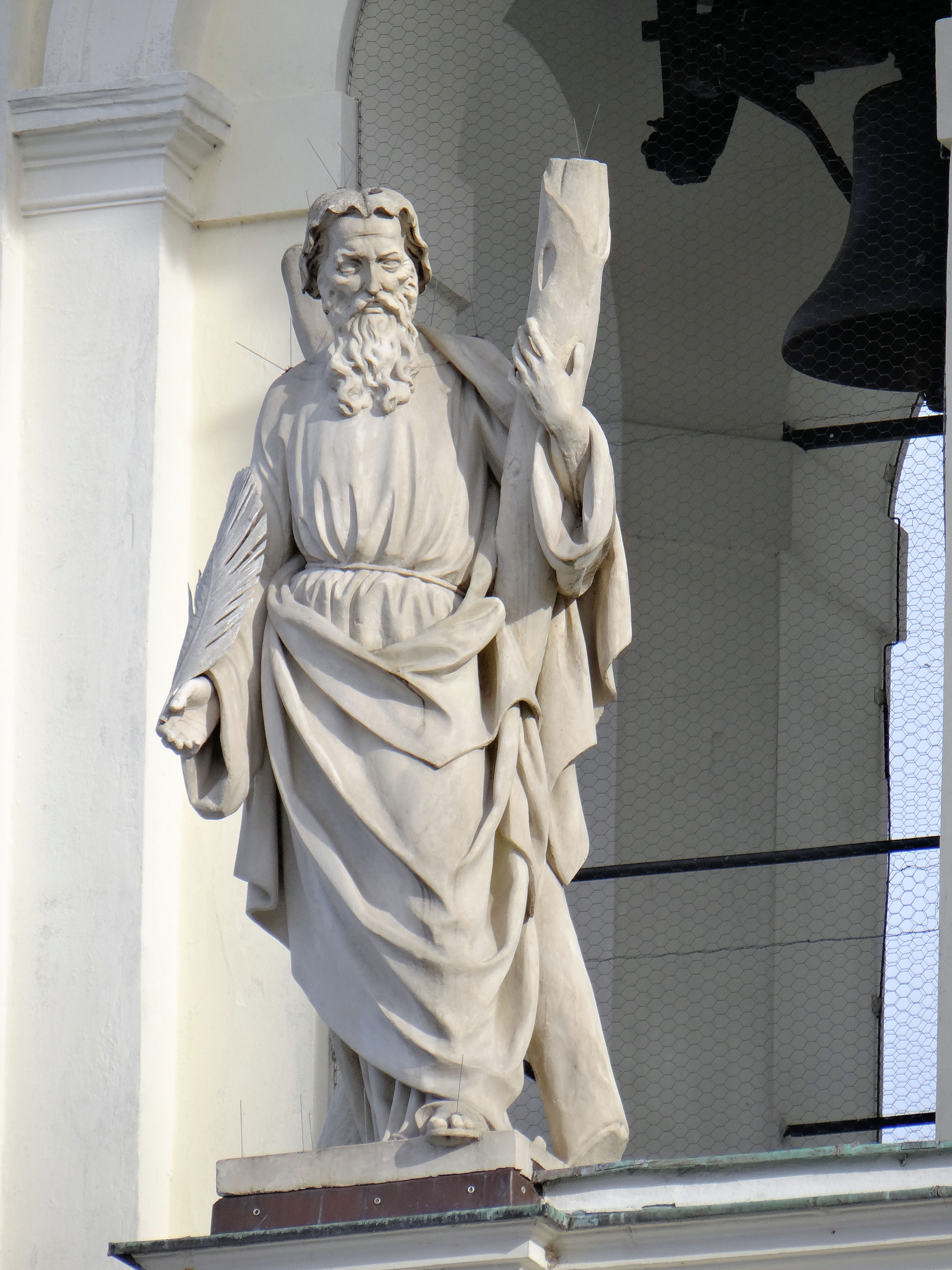
A statue on the exterior.

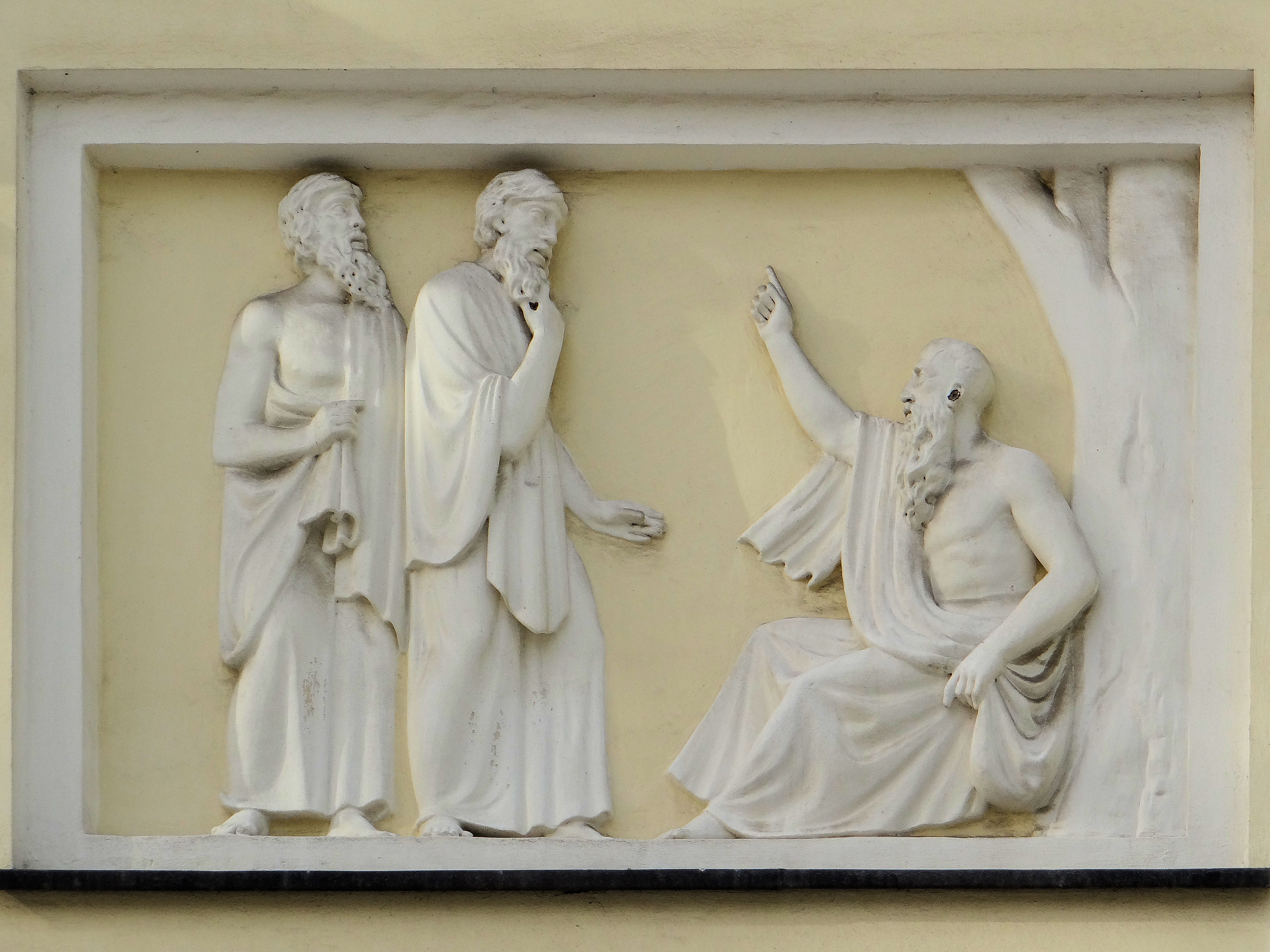
One of the reliefs on the exterior.

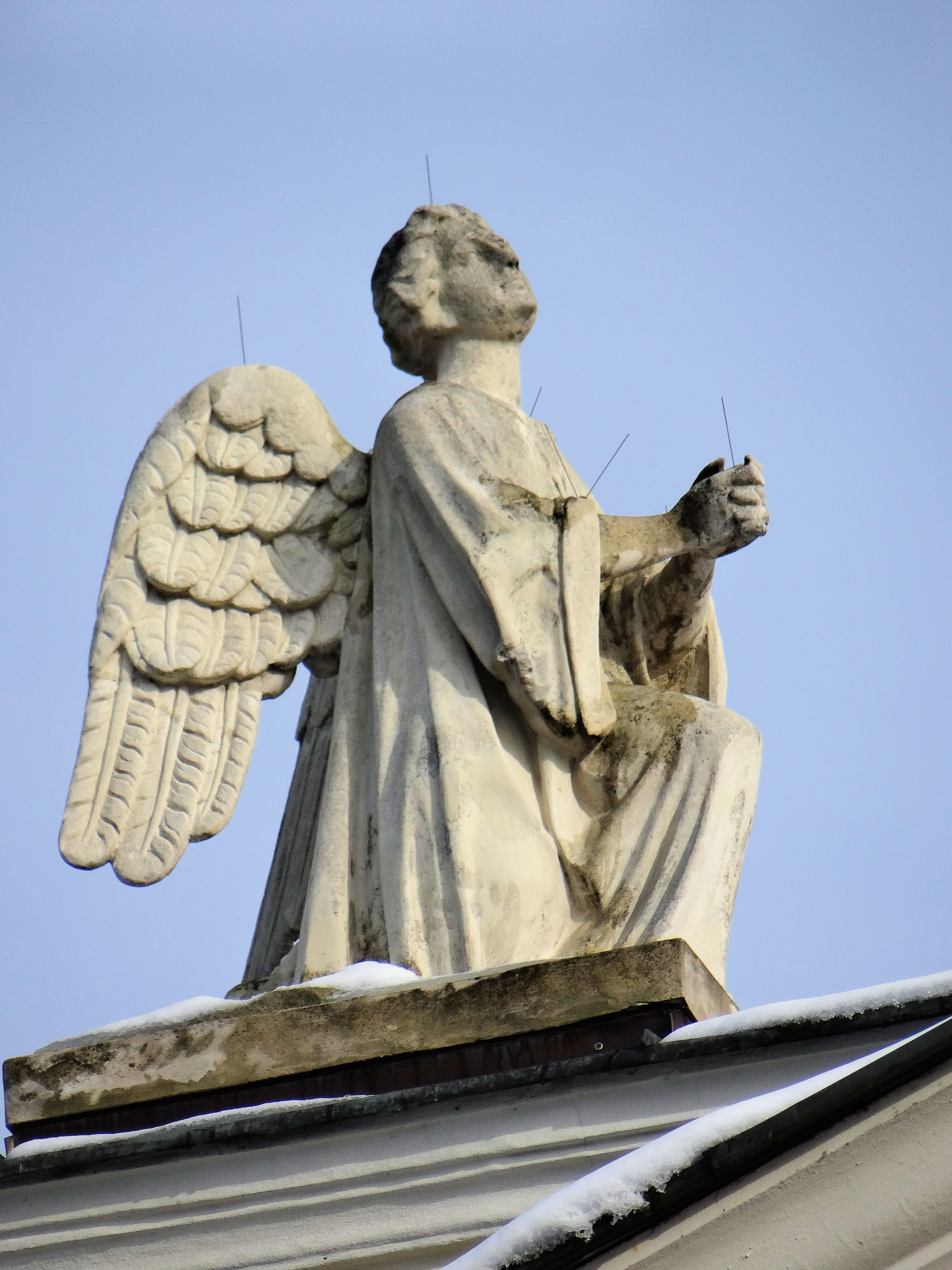
A statue of an angel on the exterior.

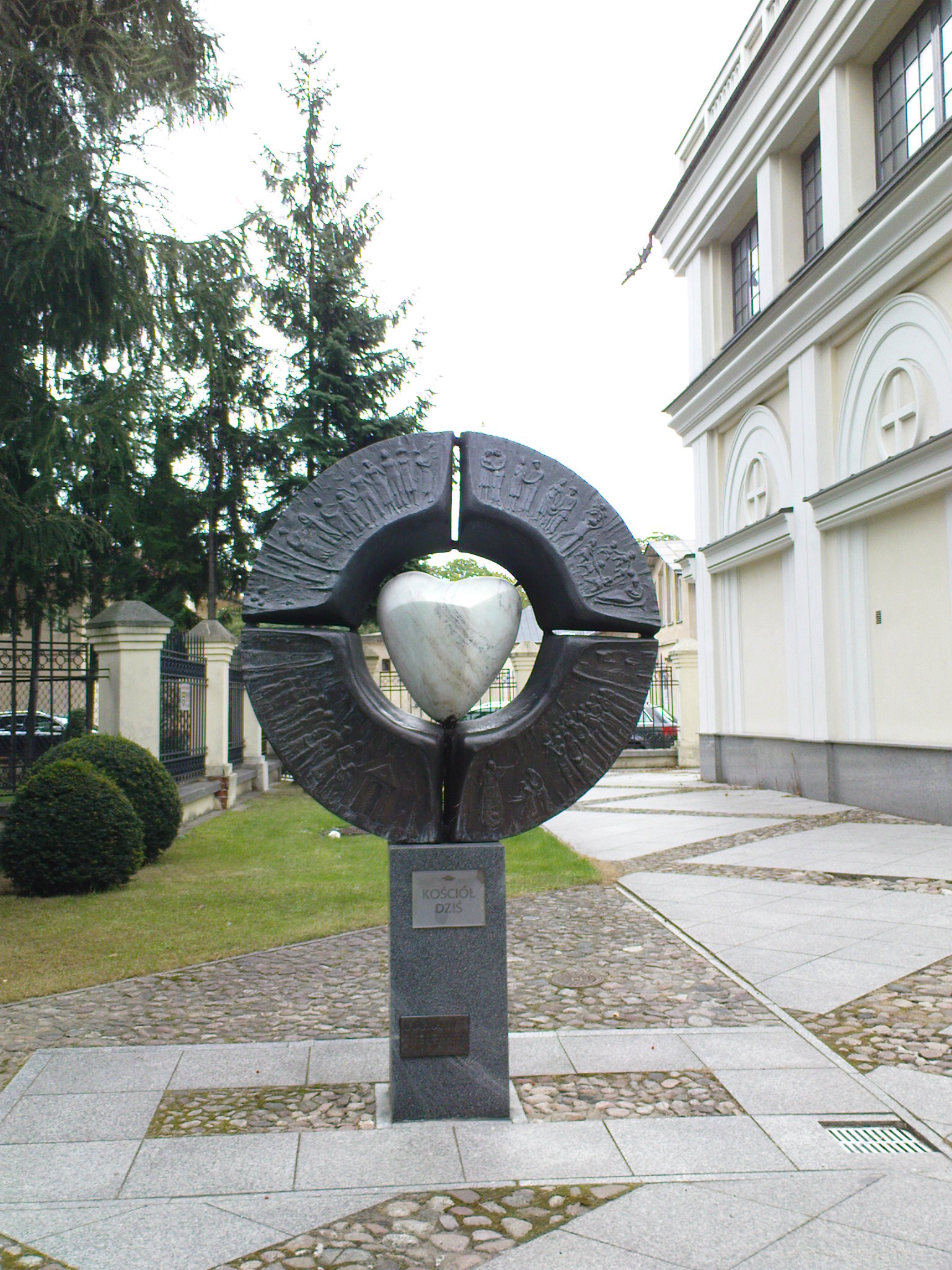
Sculpture titled Ecclesia by Maria Owczarczyk.

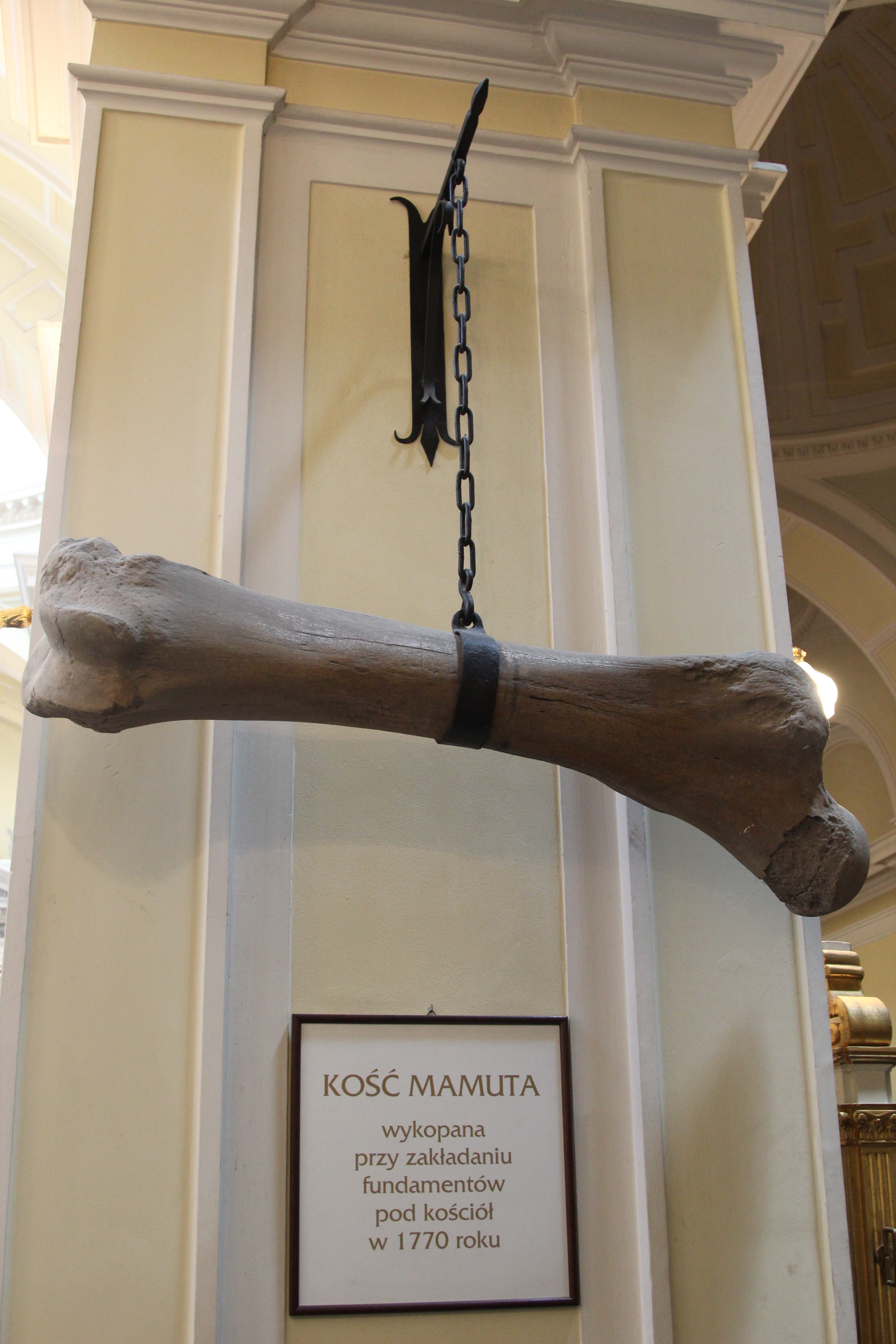
The mammoth bone displayed inside the church.

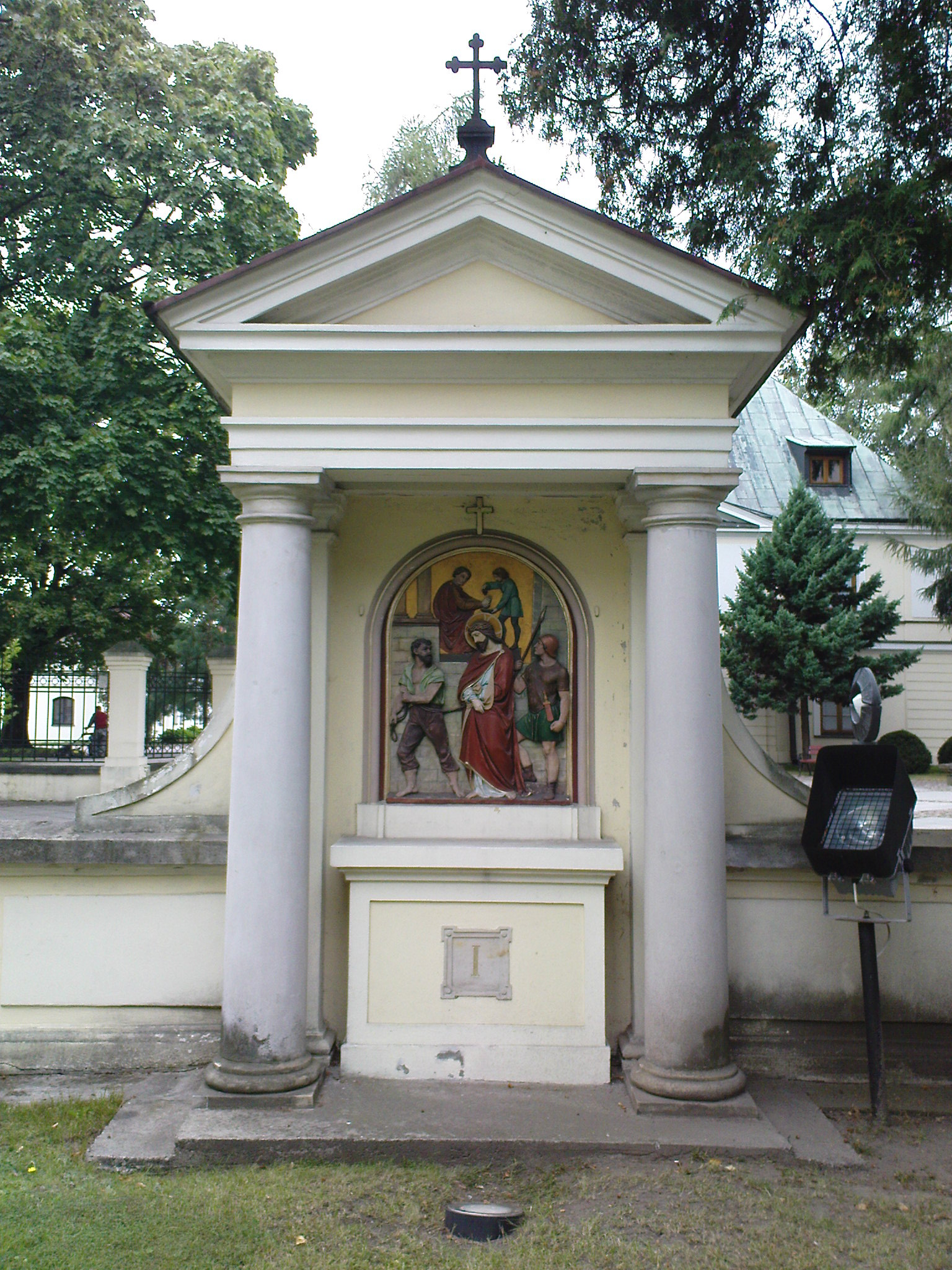
One of the small chapel booths depicting the Stations of the Cross.

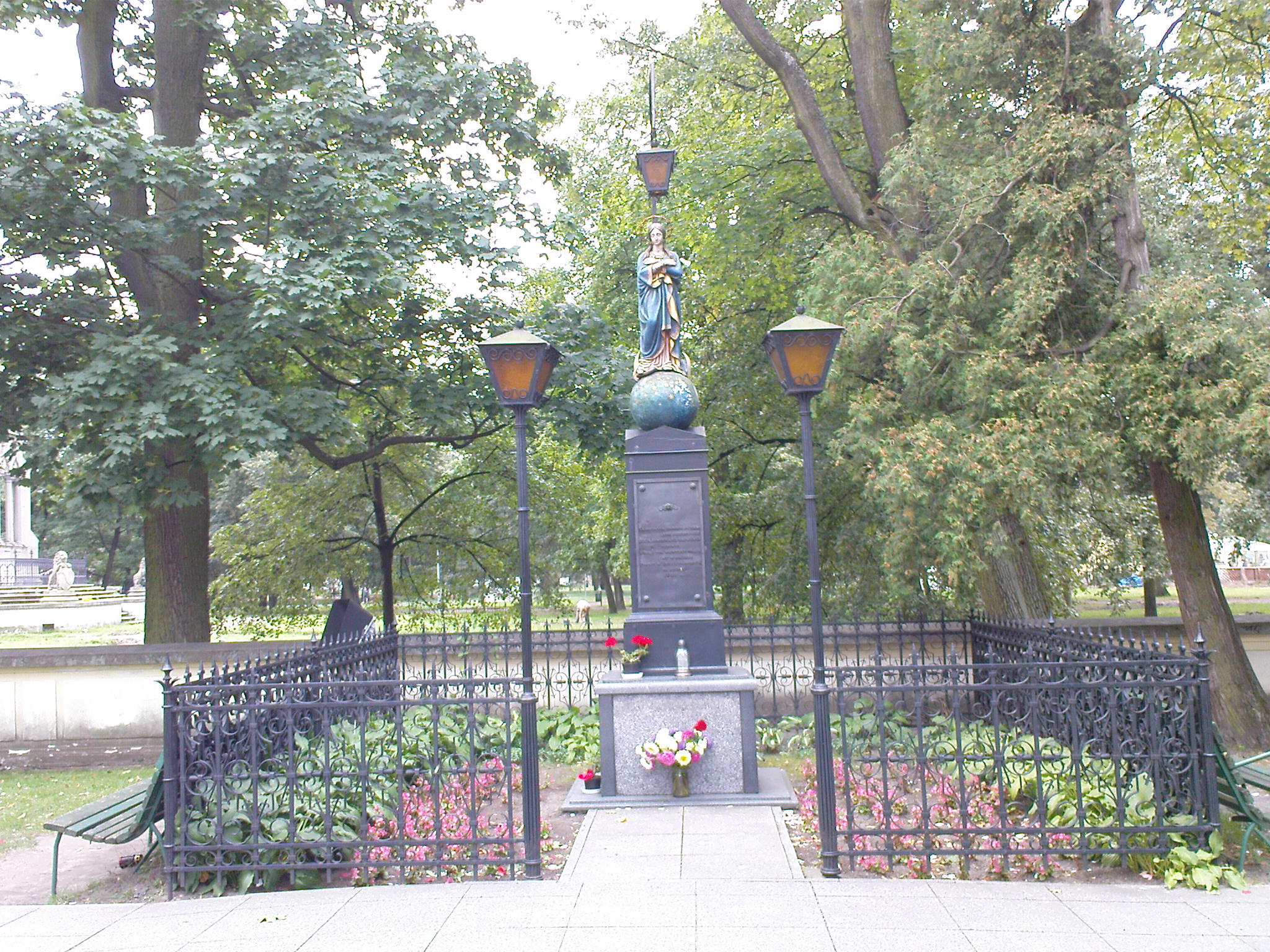
The statue of Mary of Nazareth.
