= Nadwiśle =

Neighbourhood of Warsaw, Poland

- Municipal neighbourhood and City Information System area
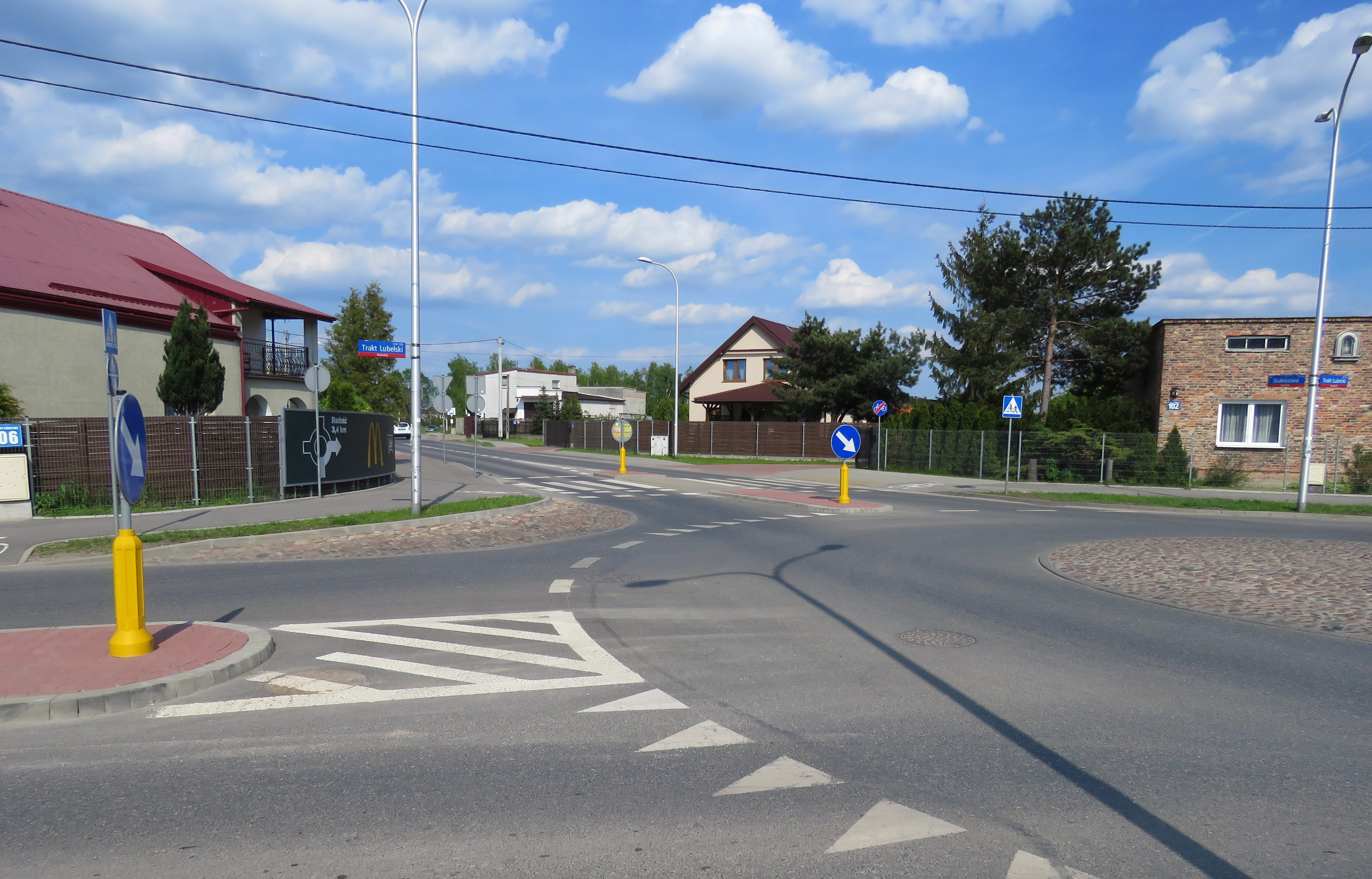
- The intersection of Trakt Lubelski Street and Skalnicowa Street in Nadwiśle, in 2017.
- Interactive map of Nadwiśle
- Coordinates: 52°10′04″N 21°08′49″E
- Country: Poland
- Voivodeship: Masovian
- City and county: Warsaw
- District: Wawer
- Seat: 28 Cyklamenów Street, Warsaw
- Time zone: UTC+1 (CET)
  - Summer (DST): UTC+2 (CEST)
- Area code: +48 22

Nadwiśle (Polish pronunciation: [nadˈviɕ.lɛ]) is a municipal neighbourhood, and a City Information System area, in Warsaw, Poland, located within the district of Wawer. It is a residential area of single-family housing.

== History ==
The archaeological foundings in the area of current Odrębna Street has unearthed the remains of a cemetery dating to the Bronze Age and the Iron Age.

By 13th century, in the area was founded the village of Miedzeszyn, owned by the Catholic parish in Błonie. In the Middle Ages there was river crossing across Vistula, and local inhabitants had permission for fishing.

In the early 20th century, prior to the outbreak of the First World War, to the east was established a holiday village, which begun being addressed as Miedzeszyn, while the older settlement became known as Miedzeszyn-Wieś (Village of Miedzeszyn).

By 1921 in the area were also present villages of Julianów, Skrzypki, Wólka Zerzeńska, and Zatrzebie. On 14 May 1951, it was incorporated into the city of Warsaw.

In 2004, the district of Wawer was subdivided into the areas of the City Information System, with one of them becoming Nadwiśle. It was the first time said name was used for the area, with it meaning "a place located on Vistula". It included Miedzeszyn-Wieś, while Miedzeszyn formed its own area.

Between 2017 and 2020, there was constructed the Anna Jagiellon Bridge forming a crossing across Vistula, and part of the Expressway S2. It was opened on 22 December 2020.

== Characteristics ==
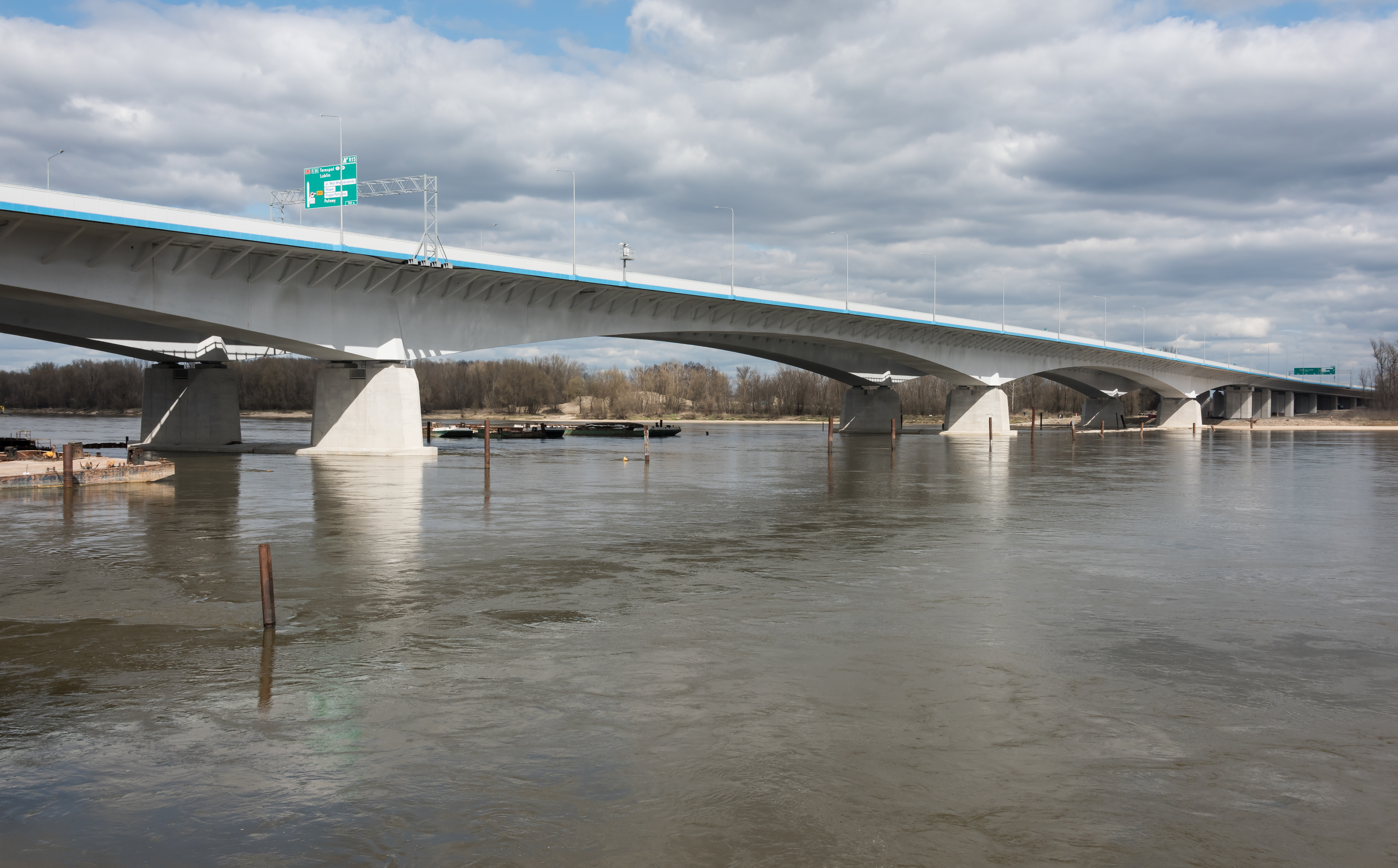
The Anna Jagiellon Bridge in Nadwiśle, in 2021.

Nadwiśle is a residencial area of single-family housing. Its main road is Wał Miedzeszyński Street. It is a municipal neighbourhood, governed by a neighbourhood council. Its seat is located at 28 Cyklamenów Street. It also includes neighbourhoods of Julianów, Miedzeszyn-Wieś, Orzechówek, Skrzypki, Wólka Zerzeńska, and Zatrzebie.

Within Nadwiśle is located the Anna Jagiellon Bridge, which forms a crossing across Vistula river, and is a part of the Expressway S2.

== Location and administrative boundaries ==
Nadwiśle is a municipal neighbourhood, and a City Information System area, located in Warsaw, Poland, within the south-western portion of the district of Wawer. Its border is determined by a line from Vistula river to the intersection of Wał Miedzeszyński Street and Skalnicowa Street, and continuing alongside Skalnicowa Street until Zerzeń Canal, and following it until Chodzieska Street, then alongside it, Trakt Lubelski Street Street, and Borków Street until Zagóźdź Canal. From there it follows to the south until Błyskawiczna Street, and alongside it, and in the line to Vistula river.

It borders Zerzeń to the north, Radość and Miedzeszyn to the west, Falenica to the south, and, via Vistula river, Kępa Zawadowska and Zawady to the west, in the district of Wilanów.
