= Bartyki =

Neighbourhood of Warsaw, Poland

- Neighbourhood
- Interactive map of Bartyki
- Coordinates: 52°09′42″N 21°06′56″E
- Country: Poland
- Voivodeship: Masovian
- City and county: Warsaw
- District: Wilanów
- City Information System area: Zawady
- Time zone: UTC+1 (CET)
  - Summer (DST): UTC+2 (CEST)
- Area code: +48 22

Bartyki (Polish: [bɑrˈtɘ̟.ki]) is a neighbourhood in the city of Warsaw, Poland, located within the Wilanów district, in the southwestern portion of the City Information System area of Zawady. It is a residential area with low-rise single-family housing, placed alongside Syta Street. Bartyki was founded prior to the 19th century as a small hamlet, and was incorporated into Warsaw in 1951.

== History ==
The hamlet of Bartyki was settled prior to the 19th century, being located between the villages of Zawady to the north, and Kępa Zawadowska to the south. In 1921, a street in the nearby city of Warsaw, within the current district of Mokotów, leading towards Bartyki, was named after the neighbourhood. Bartyki, together with the surrounding area, was incorporated into Warsaw on 15 March 1951. In 2006, the district of Wilanów was subdivided into the City Information System areas, with Bartyki becoming part of the area of Zawady.

== Characteristics ==
Bartyki is a residential area with low-rise single-family housing, placed alongside Syta Street. It is located within the southwestern portion of the City Information System area of Zawady, within the Wilanów district.
