= Nadwilanówka =

Neighbourhood of Warsaw, Poland

- Neighbourhood
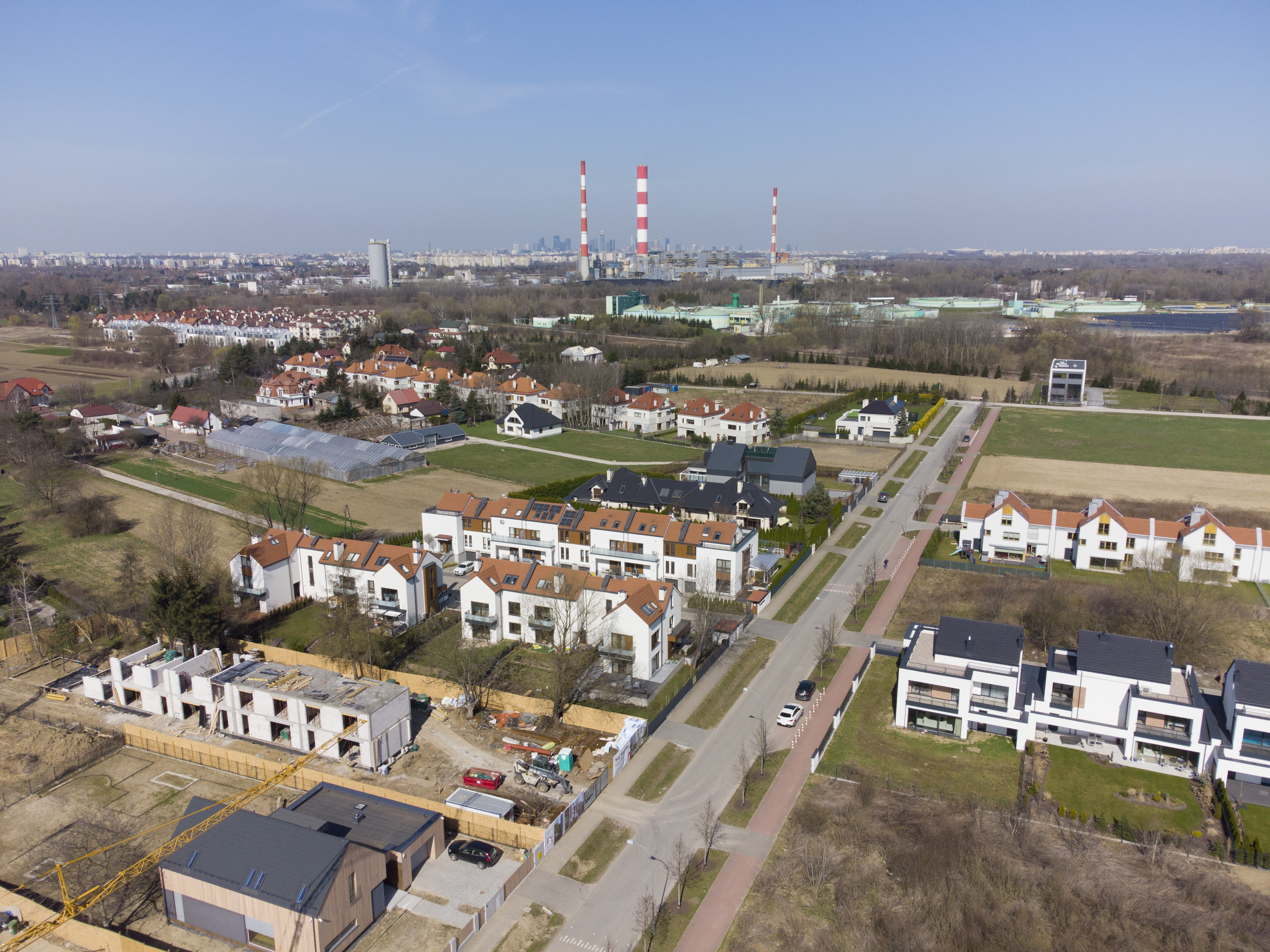
- Residential buildings at Bruzdowa Street in Nadwilanówka, in 2021.
- Interactive map of Nadwilanówka
- Coordinates: 52°10′52″N 21°06′00″E
- Country: Poland
- Voivodeship: Masovian
- City and county: Warsaw
- District: Wilanów
- City Information System area: Zawady
- Time zone: UTC+1 (CET)
  - Summer (DST): UTC+2 (CEST)
- Area code: +48 22

Nadwilanówka (Polish: [nad.vi.laˈnuf.ka]), historically known as Kępa Nadwilanówka (Polish: [ˈkɛm.pa nad.vi.laˈnuf.ka]), and Kępa Nadwilanowska (Polish: [ˈkɛm.pa nad.vi.laˈnɔf.ska]), is a neighbourhood in Warsaw, Poland, located within the district of Wilanów, in the City Information System area of Zawady.

The neighbourhood is dominated by low-rise single-family housing with additional presence of farmland. It was founded in 1819, and settled by German people. In 1951, it was incorporated into the nearby city of Warsaw.

== History ==
In the 18th century, the area of modern Nadwilanówka was an island on the Vistula river before becoming part of the mainland. The village of Nadwilanówka was founded in 1819, by nobleperson Stanisław Kostka Potocki, together with two other villages, which were Kępa Nadwiślańska and Kępa Zawadowska. It was placed to the north of Zawady, and was inhabited by German settlers.

On 15 March 1951, Nadwilanówka, together with surrounding area, was incorporated into the nearby city of Warsaw.

In 2005, at 190 and 192 Syta Street was opened the Południe sewage treatment plant, which handles sewage from the south-western portion of Warsaw.

In 2006, the district of Wilanów was subdivided into the City Information System areas, with Nadwilanówka becoming part of the area of Zawady.

== Characteristics ==
Nadwilanówka is dominated by low-rise residential building, with additional presence of farmland.

Its western boundary is formed by Wilanówka river, and its eastern boundary, the Vistula river. Its southern boundary is at the height of Zawady Pond.

In the northern portion of the neighbourhood, at 190 and 192 Syta Street, is the Południe sewage treatment plant, which handles sewage from the south-western portion of Warsaw.
