= Miedzeszyn =

Neighbourhood of Warsaw, Poland

- Neighbourhood
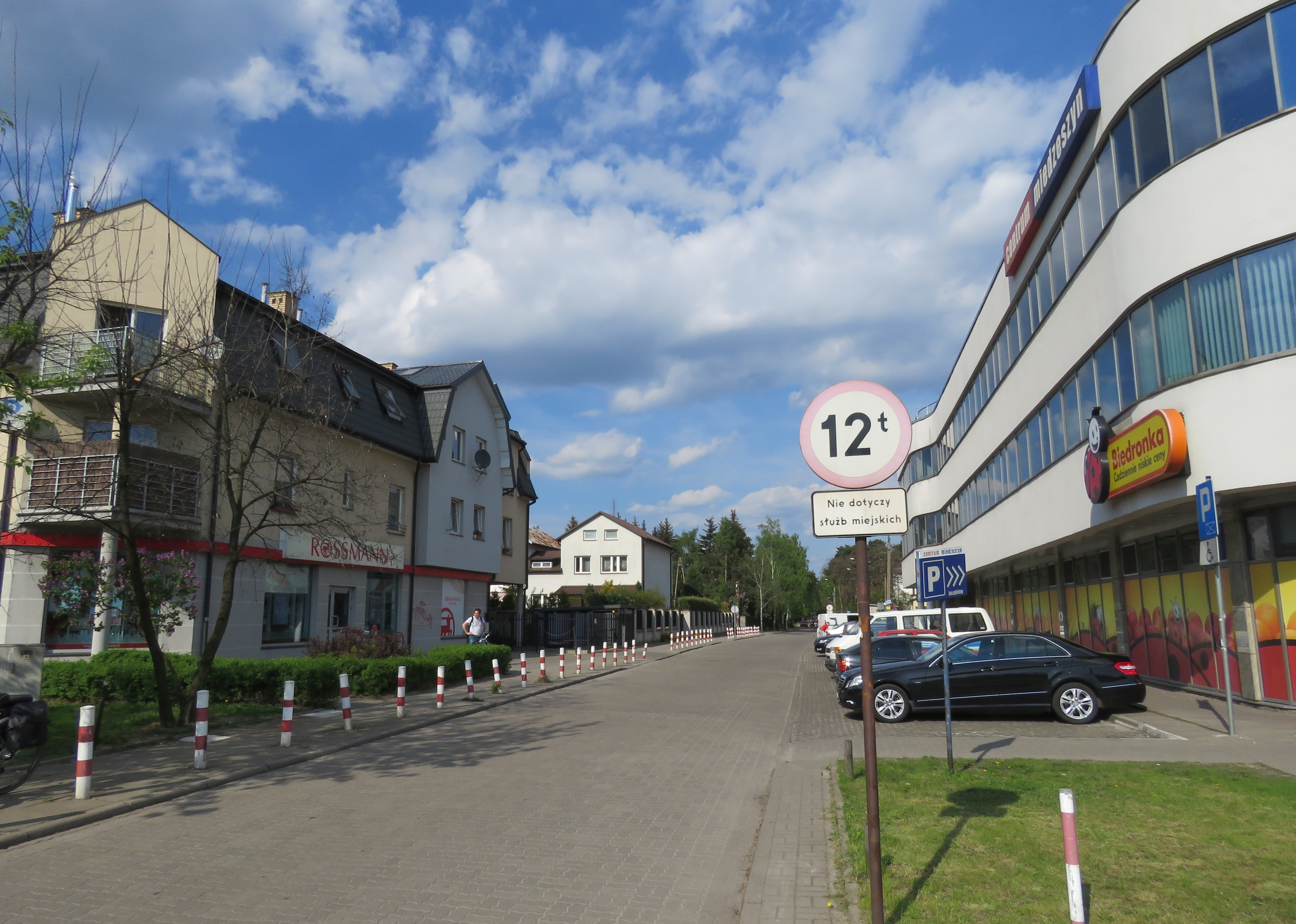
- Lawinowa Street in Miedzeszyn.
- Interactive map of Miedzeszyn
- Coordinates: 52°10′12″N 21°11′40″E
- Country: Poland
- Voivodeship: Masovian
- County: Warsaw
- District: Wawer
- Time zone: UTC+1 (CET)
  - Summer (DST): UTC+2 (CEST)
- Area code: +48 22
- Car plates: WT

Miedzeszyn is a neighbourhood of Wawer, a district of Warsaw, Poland. Until 1951, it was a separate village.

== History ==
The village of Miedzeszyn existed as far back as 1580, when it was known as Miedziessin and located in Warsaw County, Warsaw Land, Masovian Voivodeship, Polish–Lithuanian Commonwealth. In 1926, the Włodzimierz Medem Sanatorium for children with tuberculosis, was opened in the village, by General Jewish Labour Bund and CISZO, and operated until 1942. During the Nazi Germany Occupation of Poland in World War II, there was a ghetto for Jewish population, that operated there until 20 August 1942, when it was liquidated. The village was incorporated into the city of Warsaw on 5 May 1951.

== Administrative division and borders ==
The neighbourhood is divided into seven parts: Nowy Miedzeszyn, Miedzeszyn Wieś, Elżbietówek, Julianów, Świerczyna, and Zagódź. Its west border is based on the Vistula river, and the east border, on the forests on the hills.
