= Zawady, Warsaw =

Neighbourhood of Warsaw, Poland

Zawady
- Neighbourhood and City Information System area
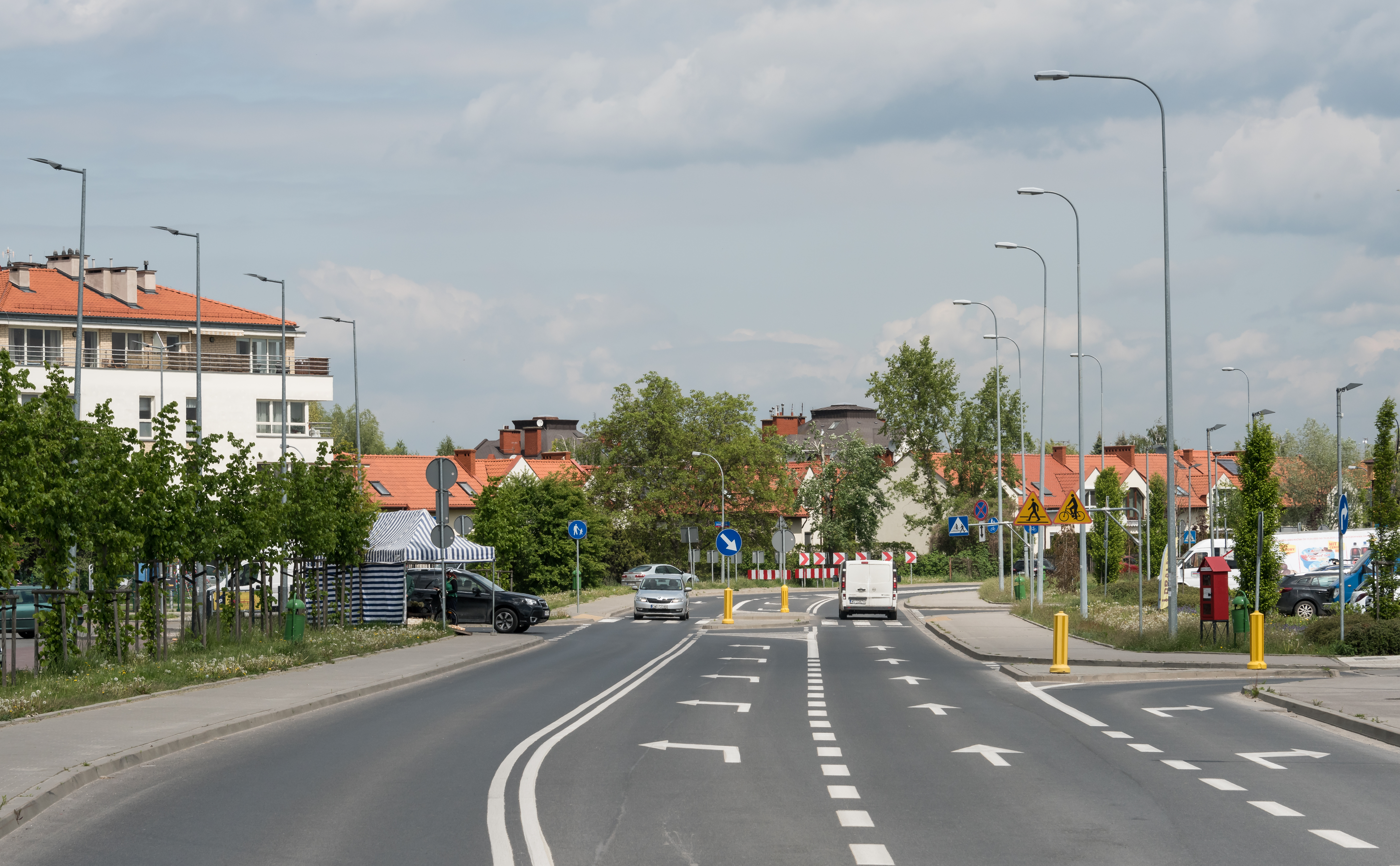
- Vogla Street in Zawady, in 2020.
- Interactive map of Zawady
- Coordinates: 52°10′17″N 21°06′49″E
- Country: Poland
- Voivodeship: Masovian
- City and county: Warsaw
- District: Wilanów
- Time zone: UTC+1 (CET)
  - Summer (DST): UTC+2 (CEST)
- Area code: +48 22

Zawady (Polish: [zaˈvadɘ̟]) is a neighbourhood, and a City Information System area, in Warsaw, Poland, located within the district of Wilanów.

The neighbourhood is dominated by low-rise residential buildings, with additional presence of farmland. It was settled next to the Vistula river in the 13th century as a village owned by the Catholic Church. In 1819, to its south were founded three settlements of Kępa Nadwiślańska, Kępa Zawadowska, and Nadwilanówka, inhabited by German settlers. In 1951, Zawady, together surrounding area, was incorporated into the nearby city of Warsaw.

== History ==
The village of Zawady was settled next to the Vistula river in the 13th century as a property of the Catholic Church. In the 17th century, Zawady became part of the Wilanów Estate, a landed property centred on the Wilanów Palace.

In 1819, nobleperson Stanisław Kostka Potocki has founded three villages near Zawady, which were Kępa Nadwiślańska, Kępa Zawadowska, and Nadwilanówka. They were inhabited by German settlers. Between Zawady and Kępa Zawadowska was also located the village of Bartyki, which was founded prior to the 19th century.

In 1827, the village had a population of 451 people in 44 households, in 1905, 409 people in 35 households, and in 1921, 447 people in 49 households. In March 1957, Zawady was flooded by the water from nearby Wilanówka river.

On 15 March 1951, Zawady, Bartyki, Kępa Zawadowska, and Nadwilanówka, together with the surrounding area, were incorporated into the nearby city of Warsaw.

In 2005, at 190 and 192 Syta Street was opened the Południe sewage treatment plant, which handles sewage from the south-western portion of Warsaw.

In 2006, the district of Wilanów was subdivided into the City Information System areas, with Zawady becoming one of them. Within their boundaries were also included Bartyki and Nadwilanówka, while Kępa Zawadowska became a separate area.

== Characteristics ==
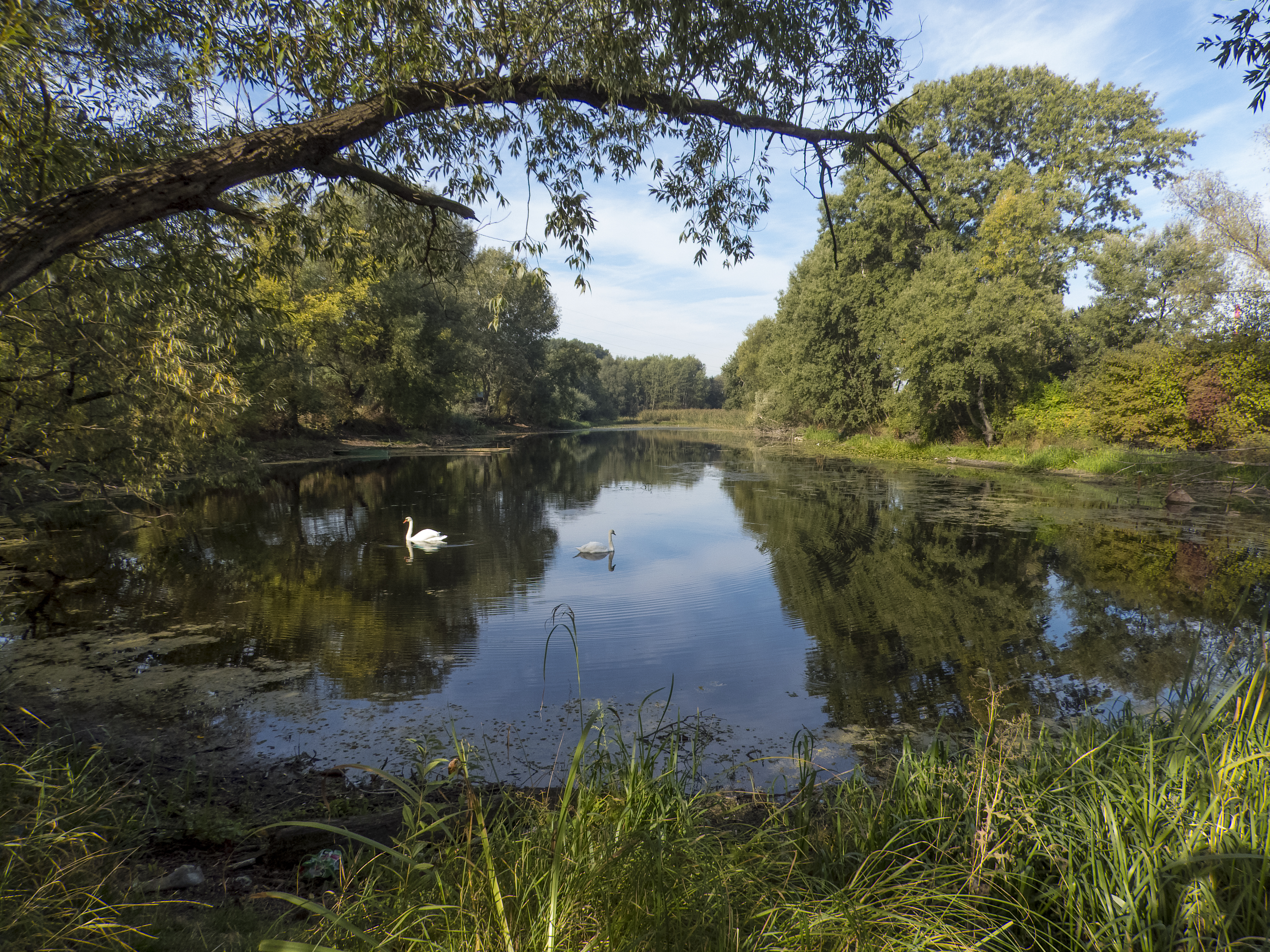
Zawady Pond in 2015.

Zawady is dominated by low-rise residential buildings, with additional presence of farmland.

Its western boundary is formed by Wilanówka river, and its eastern boundary, the Vistula river. Next to Wilanówska, in the area near Topolowa and Siedliska Streets is also located Zawady Pond.

In the northern portion of the neighbourhood, at 190 and 192 Syta Street, is the Południe sewage treatment plant, which handles sewage from the south-western portion of Warsaw.

== Location and administrative boundaries ==
Zawady is a neighbourhood, and a City Information System, located in the city of Warsaw, Poland, within the north–eastern portion of the district of Wilanów. To the west its border is determined by the Vistula river; to the south, by the Expressway S2; and to the north–east by the Wilanówka river. It borders Augustówka to the north, Nadwiśle, and Zerzeń to the east, Kępa Zawadowska to the south, and Powsinek, Wilanów Królewski, and Wilanów Niski to the east. Its northern and eastern boundaries form the border of the district of Wilanów, bordering districts of Mokotów to the north, and Wawer to the east.
