= Kępa Zawadowska =

Neighbourhood of Warsaw, Poland

- Neighbourhood and City Information System area
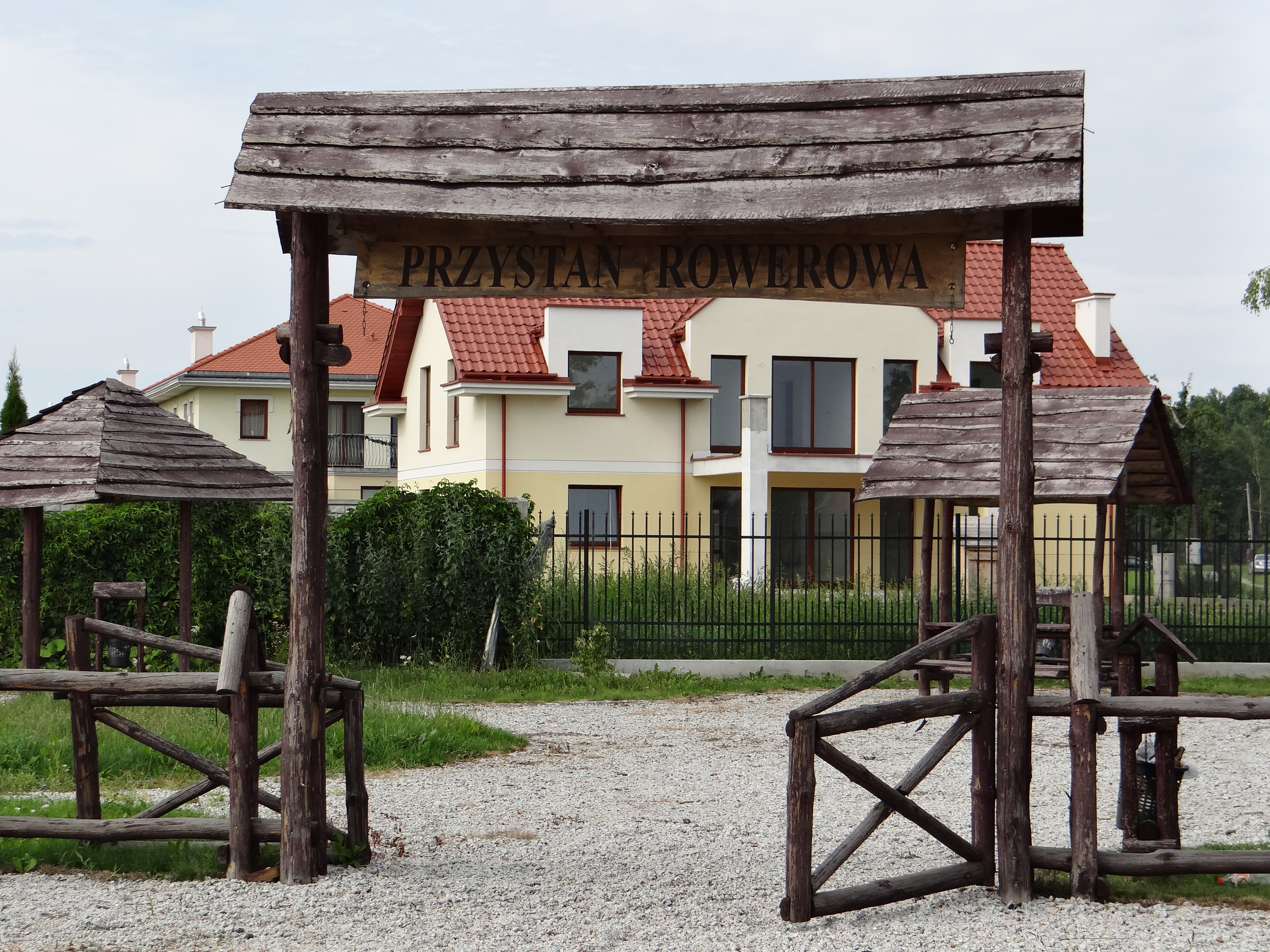
- A bicycle rest area near houses in Kępa Zawadowska, near Bruzdowa Street, in 2012.
- Interactive map of Kępa Zawadowska
- Coordinates: 52°09′08″N 21°07′45″E
- Country: Poland
- Voivodeship: Masovian
- City and county: Warsaw
- District: Wilanów
- Time zone: UTC+1 (CET)
  - Summer (DST): UTC+2 (CEST)
- Postal code: 02-995–02-994
- Area code: +48 22

Kępa Zawadowska (Polish: [ˈkɛm.pa za.vadˈɔf.ska]) is a neighbourhood and a City Information System area in Warsaw, Poland, located within the district of Wilanów.

The neighbourhood is dominated by low-rise residential buildings, with the additional presence of farmland. It was founded in 1819, and settled by German people. In 1951, it was incorporated into the nearby city of Warsaw.

== History ==
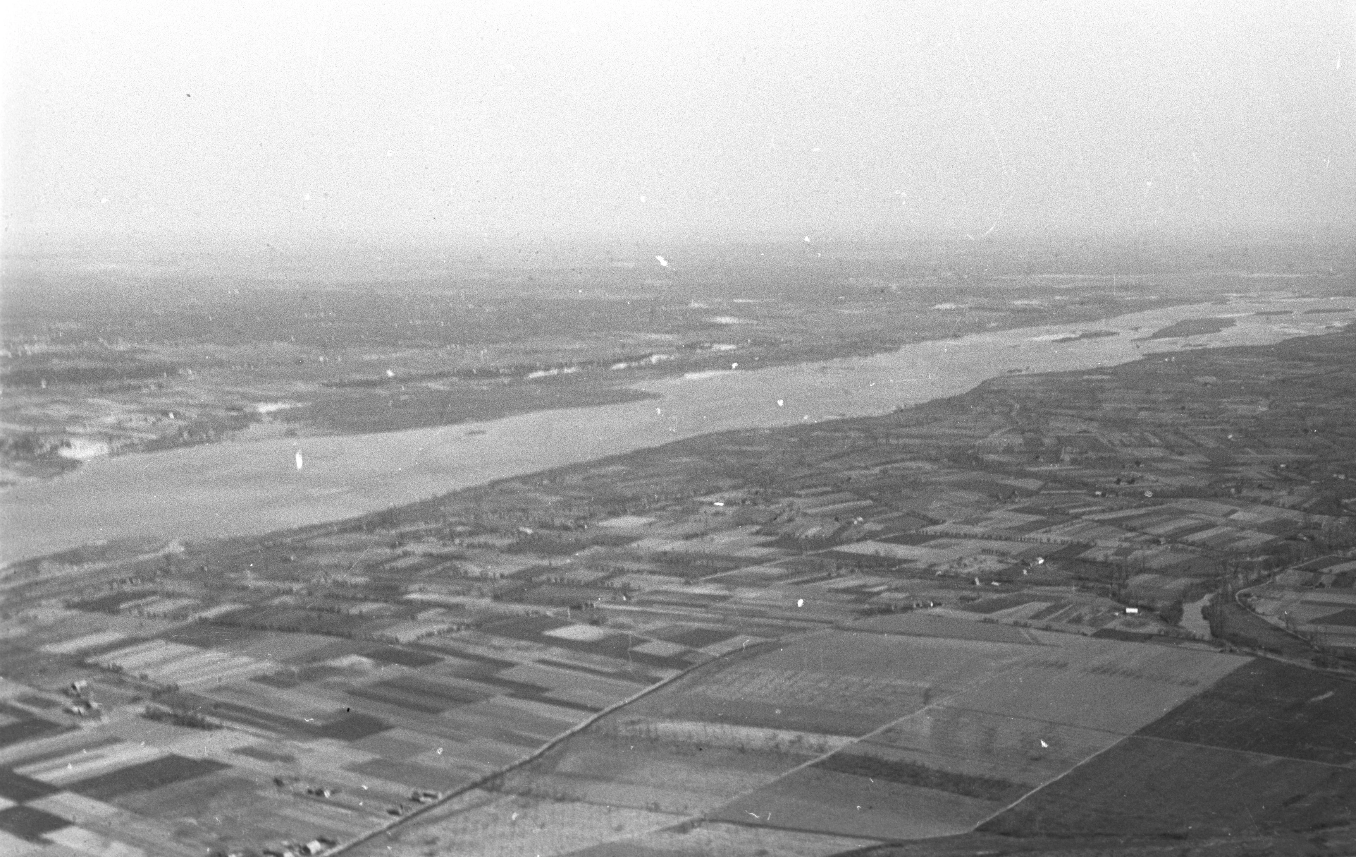
The aerial view of Kępa Zawadowska in 1948.

The village of Kępa Zawadowska was founded in 1819 next to the Vistula, by nobleperson Stanisław Kostka Potocki. It was located to the south of the village of Zawady, and inhabited by inhabited by Olenders, settlers of German origin.

In 1832 in the village new houses, a school, and an Evangelical–Augsburg Cemetery were built. In 1905 the settlement had the population if 278 people in 35 households.

During the Second World War, while under the German occupation, the inhabitants had been listed as the Volksdeutsche (ethnic Germans) by the German People's List. Between 1942 and 1943 in Kępa Zawadowska functioned a labour camp for the Jewish prisoners. In 1942 it incarcerated 400 prisoners. In June 1944, the population of the village was evacuated to Germany, due to closing in Soviet forces.

On 15 March 1951, Kępa Zawadowska was incorporated into the nearby city of Warsaw.

In 2006, the district of Wilanów was subdivided into the City Information System areas, with Kępa Zawadowska becoming one of them.

== Characteristics ==
Kępa Zawadowska is dominated by low-rise residential buildings, with additional presence of farmland.

Its western boundary is formed by Wilanówka river, and its eastern boundary, the Vistula river. In its south-eastern portion is located the Zawady Islands nature reserve, which includes a few islands on Vistula rives.

Currently, at 11 Bruzdowa Street is being built a Catholic Church of the Mission of the Students of Lord.

== Location and administrative boundaries ==
Kępa Zawadowska is a neighbourhood and a City Information System, located in the city of Warsaw, Poland, within the south-eastern portion of the district of Wilanów. To the north its border is determined by the Expressway S2; to the east by the Vistula river; to the south by the border of Warsaw to the south; and to the west by Wilanówka. It borders Zawady to the north, Falenica, and Nadwiśle to the east, Józefów to the south-east, the municipality of Konstancin-Jeziorna to the south, and Powsin, and Powsinek to the west. Its eastern boundary form the border of the district of Wilanów, bordering district of Wawer. Its southern border forms the border of Warsaw, bordering Piaseczno County, and Otwock County.
