= Falenica =

Neighborhood of Wawer, Warsaw

Coordinates: 52°10′02″N 21°12′38″E

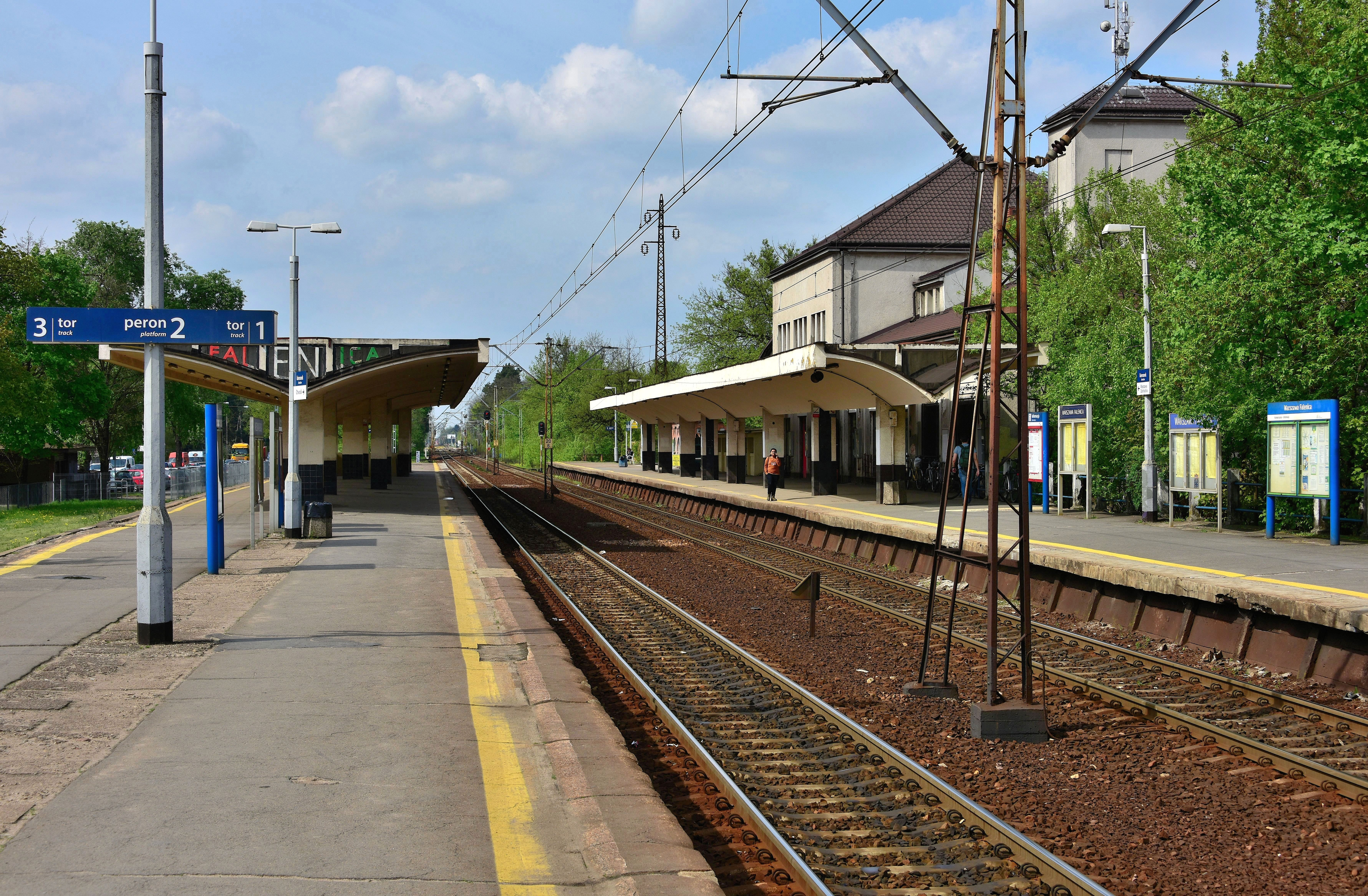
Railway station Warsaw-Falenica

Falenica is a part of Wawer, one of districts of Warsaw, located on the right bank of the Vistula, in the far southeastern corner of the city. Until 1951 it was a separate village, then it became part of Warsaw. Before the Second World War Falenica, which is located in a forested area, was a favorite location for summer cottages and houses. It has a population of around 8 600 inhabitants.

== World War II ==
During World War II the Germans opened a Jewish ghetto there, called Falenica-Miedzeszyn Ghetto. All of its inhabitants were transported to Treblinka in August 1942. Falenica is located along the main rail line, which connects Warsaw with Lublin.
