= Poles in Ukraine =

Ethnic group in Ukraine

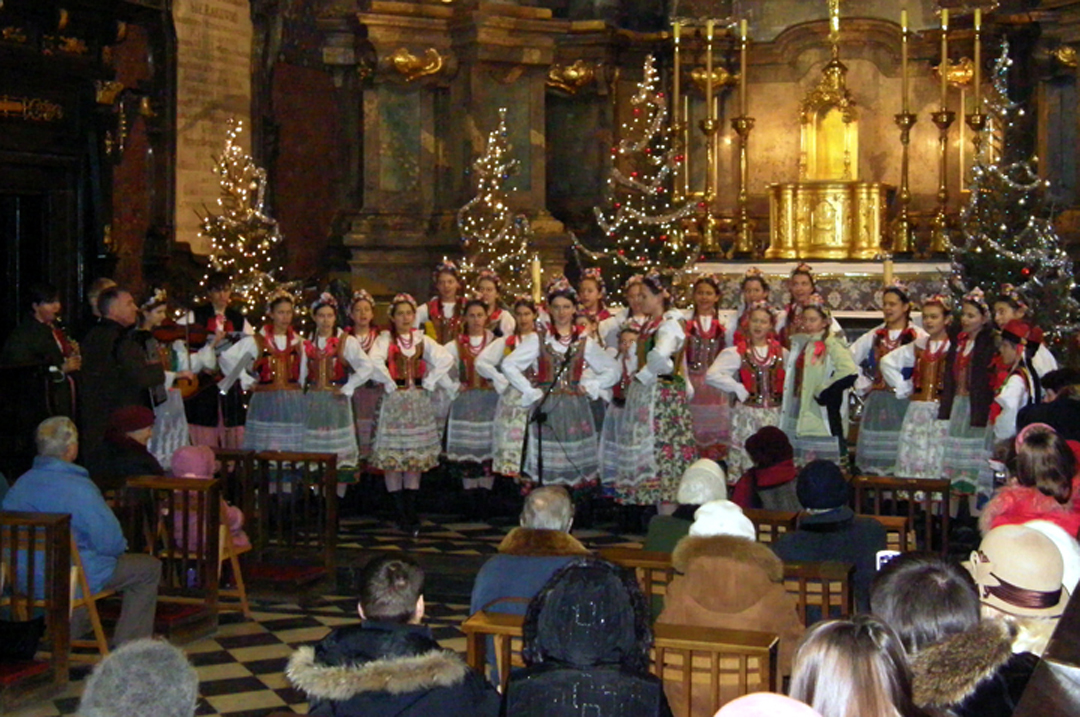
- Concert of Polish Children Choir in the Lviv Roman Catholic cathedral

Total population
- 144,130 (2001 census) – 2,000,000 (Polish estimates)

Regions with significant populations
- Zakarpattia Oblast, Zhytomyr Oblast, Khmelnytskyi Oblast, Lviv Oblast, Kyiv Oblast, Chernivtsi Oblast, Ternopil Oblast, Ivano-Frankivsk Oblast

Languages
- Polish, Ukrainian, Russian

Religion
- Roman Catholicism

Related ethnic groups
- Polish diaspora

The Polish minority in Ukraine officially numbers about 144,130 (according to the 2001 census), of whom 21,094 (14.6%) speak Polish as their first language. The history of Polish settlement in the current territory of Ukraine dates back to 1030–31. In the Late Middle Ages, following the extinction of the Rurik dynasty in 1323, the Kingdom of Poland expanded eastwards in 1340 to include the lands of Przemyśl and in 1366, Kamianets-Podilskyi (Kamieniec Podolski) as well. The settlement of Poles became common there after the Polish–Lithuanian peace treaty signed in 1366 between Casimir III the Great of Poland, and Liubartas of Lithuania.

== History ==
=== Early medieval times ===
In early medieval times the western territory of what is now Ukraine (Eastern Galicia) was known as Red Ruthenia. It was settled by tribes of Western Slavs – Lendians. According to the Nestor – Primary Chronicle tribe of Lendians were 'Lachy' (Lechites) and their Duke Wlodzislav took part in dealing with Byzantine empire together with the Rus. It is first attested in AD 981, when Vladimir the Great of Kievan Rus conquered the Red Ruthenian strongholds in his military campaign on the border with the land of Lendians. Nestor reports in his chronicle that: "Vladimir marched upon the Lyakhs (k Lyakbotri) and took their cities: Peremyshl (modern Przemyśl), Cherven (modern Czermno), and other towns." In the following century, the area was taken by Boleslav the Brave of Poland in 1018, then won by the Kievan Rus' in 1031 and recaptured by Poland in 1069. From 1080 until 1349 this region was part of Kievan Rus or the Kingdom of Galicia–Volhynia. During this time Polish settlers helped to economically develop the region and they formed a significant element in the courts of the Galician rulers.

Following the extinction of the Rurikid dynasty and the end of the Galician-Volhynian kingdom, this region was seized by the Polish Crown, and included in the Polish–Lithuanian peace treaty signed in 1366 by Casimir III of Poland, with Liubartas of Lithuania. A Roman Catholic Archdiocese was established in the old Galician capital of Halych in 1375, and was transferred to Lviv in 1412. Native nobles (boyars) who refused to declare allegiance to the Polish kingdom were dispossessed of their lands, which were granted to arriving nobles from Poland. Large numbers of settlers came to Galician lands from Lesser Poland; Polish nobles were given land grants, Polish peasants settled in the countryside and Polish, German and Armenian merchants and craftsmen settled in the towns. Over time, many but not all of the remaining native nobility (particularly the wealthy ones with much land) as well as the townspeople assimilated into Polish culture, while the Polish peasant settlers assimilated into the native culture.

In the Ukrainian lands further east, near the Kyiv region, the first Polish settlers were prisoners of war who were captured by Yaroslav the Wise during his war against Poland in 1030–1031 and settled on lands near Kyiv, where they became farmers and assimilated into the local population. More Polish settlers arrived in the 12th century, resulting in the establishment of a Roman Catholic mission in Kyiv.

=== During the Time of the Polish–Lithuanian Commonwealth ===
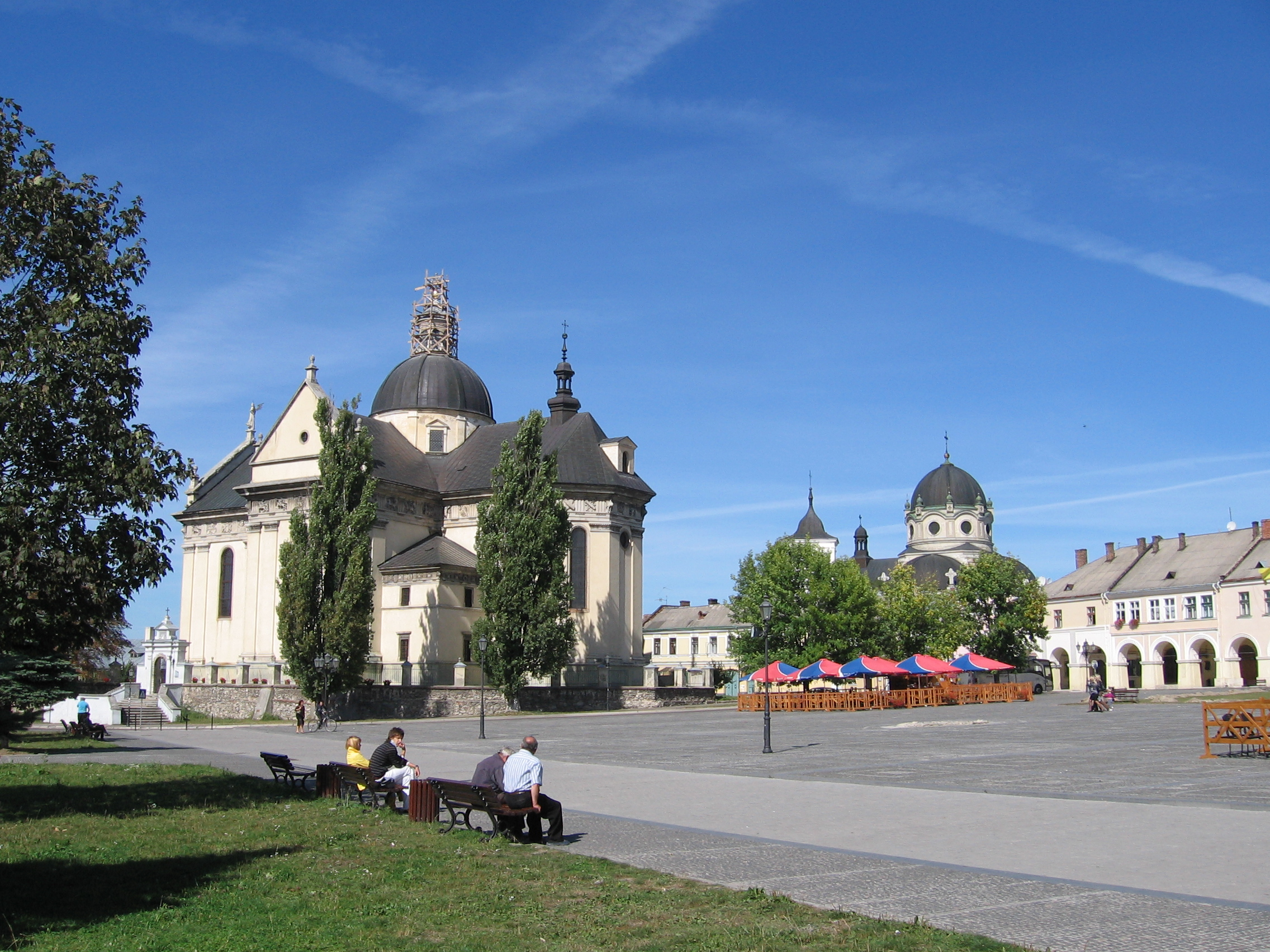
Zhovkva (Żółkiew) was founded in the 16th century as a Renaissance town by Polish military leader Stanisław Żółkiewski

To mitigate the depopulation stemming from the Crimean–Nogai slave raids, Polish kings, in particular Stephen Báthory and Sigismund III Vasa, sponsored large-scale Polish colonization of central and eastern Ukrainian regions in the 16th and 17th centuries. Polish magnates were given large tracts of sparsely settled lands, while Polish petty gentry managed the estates and served as soldiers. Serfs were enticed to move into these territories by a temporary 20 year exemption from serfdom. Although most serfs were from western Ukrainian lands, a significant number of Polish serfs from central Poland also settled these estates. The latter tended to assimilate into Ukrainian society and some of them even took part in Cossack uprisings against the landlords. Polish magnates from Ukraine, such as members of the family Potocki and Zolkiewski, played a significant political and social role within the Polish–Lithuanian Commonwealth, as did Polonized native magnates such as the family Wisniowiecki. They were amongst the wealthiest nobles in Poland; the Wisniowiecki estate included 38,000 households with a population of 230,000 subjects. In the 16th century, Bratslav and Kyiv areas, which had suffered substantial destruction during the previous century's conflicts, were repopulated by Volhynian Ruthenians and Polish settlers from Lesser Poland.

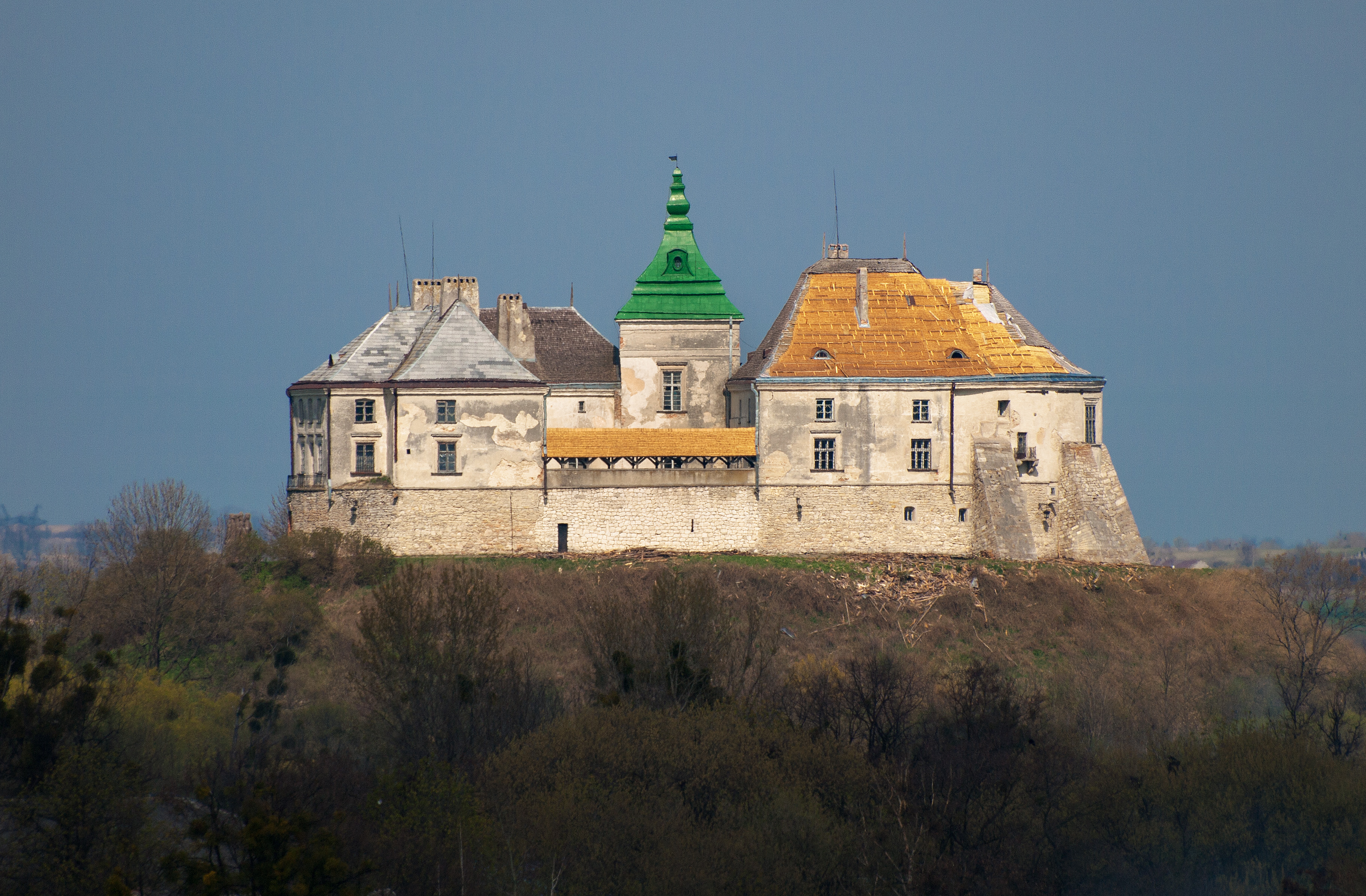
Olesko Castle is the birthplace of Polish King John III Sobieski

Polish rule involved expansion of Jesuit schools and large scale construction or ornate castles and estates that included libraries, art collections and archives that in many cases were the equal in importance to those in Poland itself. Prominent Poles from lands that are currently Ukraine include the historian and poet Józef Bartłomiej Zimorowic, Polish baroque poet Kasper Twardowski, and Roman Catholic Bishop of Kyiv, as well as writer, Andrzej Chryzostom Załuski. Also Polish Kings Michał Korybut Wiśniowiecki, John III Sobieski and Stanisław Leszczyński were born in present-day Western Ukraine.

Following the successful uprising of Bohdan Khmelnytsky against the Polish crown in the mid 17th century, Ukrainian lands east of the Dnipro River, the Cossack Hetmanate, became briefly independent and then became an autonomous part of Russia. In this area, many of the Polish nobles were expelled and Polish political influence was curtailed. Regions west of the river, however, remained part of Poland-Lithuania for approximately another 150 years, retained their Polish orientation and were the stage of ongoing Polish colonization. By the late 18th century, approximately 240,000 people of the Volhynian, Podilian and Kyiv regions, or 11% of the population, were Roman Catholics, most of whom were Poles. Approximately half of this number had arrived in the early 18th century.

=== Within the Cossack Hetmanate ===
In the mid seventeenth century the Cossack Hetmanate east of the Dnipro River successfully rebelled against the Polish-Lithuanian Commonwealth, and after a brief period of independence became an autonomous area under the Russian Empire. In this region some Poles and Polonized Ukrainian nobles who had joined the Cossacks remained and in some cases even obtained high positions in the local administration. Most of the Polish nobles, however, were expelled and their political influence eliminated. Polish influence upon the local Ukrainian culture remained strong until the mid 18th century, however. The Polish language was the administrative language of the Hetmanate and the language of command for the Hetmanate's military forces. The Hetmanate's most prominent schools, the Kyiv Academy and Chernihiv Collegium, used Polish and Latin as languages of instruction. Polish was taught in schools and Kyiv and Chernihiv hosted Polish printing-houses.

=== During the Nineteenth and Early Twentieth Centuries ===
At the end of the 18th century, resulting from joint Partitions of Poland with Austria-Hungary and the German Empire, Russia absorbed lands west of Kyiv while Austria absorbed the region of eastern Galicia. The Cossack Hetmanate was eliminated and its lands fully integrated within the Russian Empire.

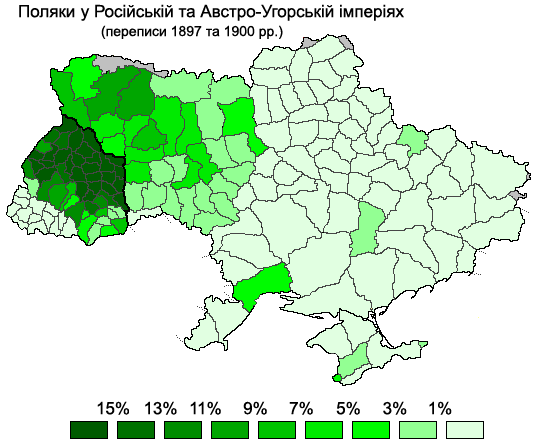
Map showing percentage of population who are of Polish origin in Austria-Hungary and Russia, 1897–1900

==== Within the Russian Empire ====
At the time of the partition, approximately ten percent of the population of the territories annexed by Russia was Polish. Poles included wealthy magnates with large estates, poorer nobles who worked as administrators or soldiers, and peasants. Long after this region ceased being a part of Poland, Poles continued to play an important role in both the province and in the city of Kyiv. Until the failed Polish insurrection of 1830–1831, Polish continued to be the administrative language in education, government and the courts. In 1812 there were over 43,000 Polish noblemen in Kyiv Governorate, compared to only approximately 1,000 "Russian" nobles. Typically the nobles spent their winters in the city of Kyiv, where they held Polish balls and fairs. Throughout the Tsarist period Poles wielded considerable influence. Polish landlords owned approximately 46 percent of all private property in Ukraine west of the Dnipro River. Until the mid-18th century Kyiv (Polish Kijów) was Polish in culture, although Poles made up no more than ten percent of Kyiv's population and 25% of its voters. During the 1830s Polish was the language of Kyiv's educational system, and until Polish enrollment in Kyiv's university of St. Vladimir was restricted in the 1860s they made up the majority of that school's student body. The Russian government's cancellation of Kyiv city's autonomy and its placement under the rule of bureaucrats appointed from St. Petersburg was largely motivated by fear of Polish insurrection in the city. Warsaw factories and fine Warsaw shops had branches in Kyiv. Józef Zawadzki, founder of Kyiv's stock exchange, served as the city's mayor in the 1890s. In 1909, 9.8 percent of the city of Kyiv's population (44,400 people) were Poles. Kieven Poles tended to be friendly towards the Ukrainian national movement in the city, and some took part in Ukrainian organizations. Henryk Józewski, a Pole from Kyiv, served in the government of the Ukrainian People's Republic under his friend Symon Petliura and later as governor of Volhynia under Poland.

===== Polish assimilation =====
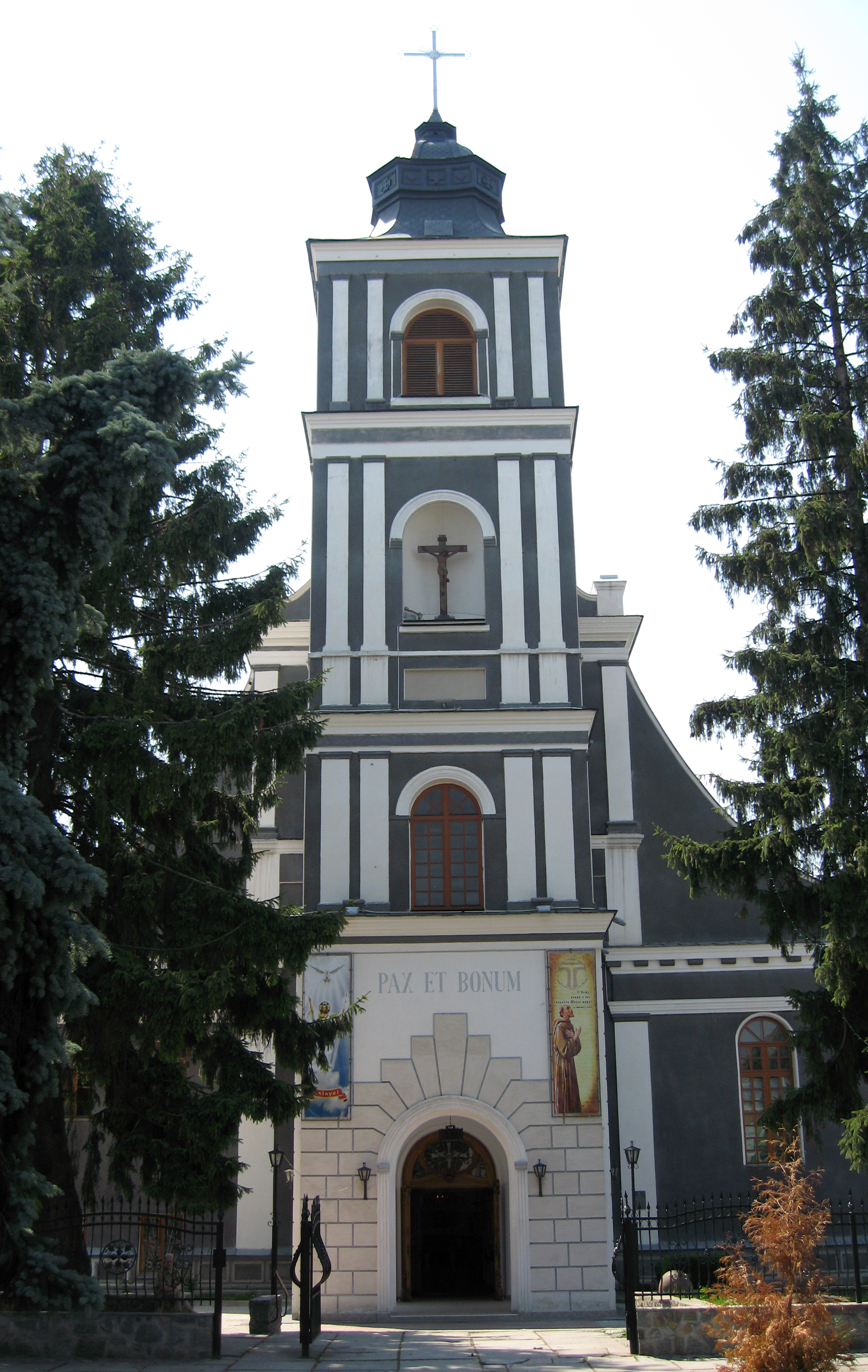
The Catholic Church of St. John in the center of Zhytomyr. This city is the site of the third largest Polish cemetery outside Poland.

Under the Russian Empire, Polish society tended to stratify. The Polish magnates prospered under the Russian Empire, at the expense of the serfs and of the poorer Polish nobility whom they pushed from the land. The wealthy magnates tended to oppose the Polish insurrections, identified with their Russian landlord peers, and often moved to St. Petersburg. The Polish national movement in the Ukrainian lands thus tended to be led by members of the middle and poorer gentry, who formed secret societies in places with large Polish populations, such as Kyiv, Zhytomyr and Berdychiv. As a result of an anti-Russian insurrection in 1830, the Polish middle and poorer nobility were stripped of their legal noble status by the Russian government. These Polish nobles, legally reduced to the status of peasants, often assimilated into the Ukrainian language and culture. Many of the poorer Polish nobles who became Ukrainianized in language, culture and political loyalty constituted an important element of the growing Ukrainian national movement. Ukrainian-speaking Poles from the Russian empire include Ukrainian political theorist Vyacheslav Lypynsky, historian and nineteenth century leader of the Ukrainian national awakening Volodymyr Antonovych (Włodzimierz Antonowicz), and painter Kazimir Malevich.

Due to assimilation, whereas at the time of the annexation of Ukrainian lands by Russia in 1795 10% of the population were Poles, in spite of ongoing migration of Poles from central Poland into Ukrainian lands, by the end of the nineteenth century only three percent of the total population of these territories reported that Polish was their first language.

==== Poles in Austria-Hungary (Eastern Galicia) ====
Approximately 21% of the population of Ukrainian territory annexed by Austria-Hungary were Poles. In 1890, 68% of Poles in this region were peasants, 16 percent worked in industry, 8.5 percent worked in transport or trade, and 7.5 percent had administrative, professional or service jobs.

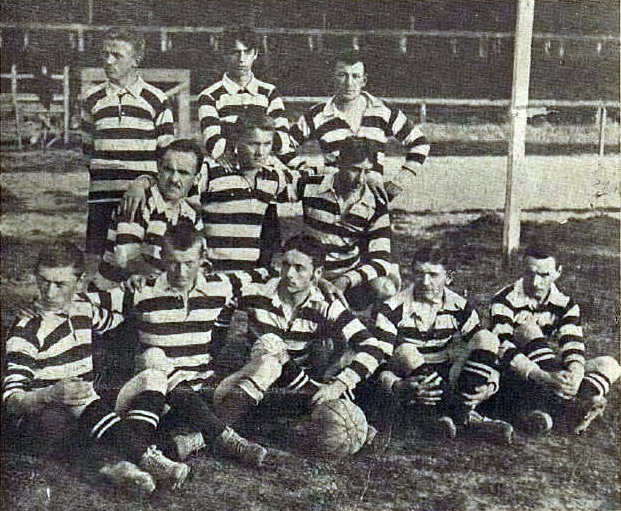
The first Polish football clubs, Lechia Lwów (pictured), Czarni Lwów and Pogoń Lwów, were all founded and based in Lwów (present-day Lviv)

The Austrians began their rule by implementing policies that limited the control of Polish nobles and magnates over peasants; the Polish nobles and magnates, however, then took over the local bureaucracy and succeeded in establishing control over most municipal governments, as well as the regional assembly. These ethnic Polish authorities promoted Polish colonization of lands in eastern Galicia; by 1890, one third of the Poles living in eastern Galicia had moved there from western areas. Approximately 35,000 Poles moved into these territories between 1891 and 1900 alone. Between 1852 and 1912, the Polish-controlled local administration provided 237,000 hectares of land to Poles moving to eastern Galicia from western Galicia, and only 38,000 hectares of land to Ukrainians. As a result of such policies, despite larger Ukrainian family sizes the percentage of the population who were ethnic Poles grew significantly, to over 25% by 1910. Under Austrian rule Lviv became a leading center of the Polish national revival. Lviv was home to the Polish Ossolineum, with the second largest collection of Polish books in the world, the Polish Academy of Arts, the Polish Historical Society, the Polish Theater and Polish Archdiocese.

Poles in Austria-Hungarian-ruled Ukraine generally belonged to three groups politically: Polish conservative landowners; Polish liberal nationalists (the National Democrats, or Endeks), and socialist groups. Of these, only the latter group cooperated with Ukrainians, whereas the other two were extremely hostile towards Ukrainian political or cultural aspirations. Thus, in contrast to the situation in Russian-ruled Ukraine, where relations between Poles and Ukrainians were friendly and where Poles were often active in the Ukrainian national movement, in Austrian-ruled Ukraine relations between Poles and Ukrainians were generally quite antagonistic. When Ukrainian historian Mykhailo Hrushevskyi moved from Kyiv to Lviv in 1894 he was surprised to see that Poles there were hostile to the Ukrainian cause.

=== During the First World War and Revolution ===
==== Within the Russian Empire ====
During the First World War, over 40,000 Polish refugees fleeing the central powers settled in Kyiv. After the Revolution, the mainstream Polish political organization, the Polish Democratic Center Party, supported the Ukrainian national movement's post-revolutionary government, the Ukrainian Central Rada. One of the Polish Democratic Center Party leaders, Mieczysław Mickiewicz, was appointed the head of the Ukrainian government's Ministry of Polish Affairs. In November 1917, a Polish University College was established in Kyiv.

The advance of the Bolshevik armies, the Polish–Soviet War of 1919–1921, and the incorporation of these Ukrainian lands into the Soviet Union, led to a massive exodus of Poles, particularly landowners and intelligentsia, from Ukraine into Poland. Some of these emigrants, such as Henryk Józewski, obtained important positions within the Polish government.

==== In what is now Western Ukraine ====
After the dissolution of Austria-Hungary in November 1918, the region's Poles found themselves within the West Ukrainian People's Republic. Poles constituted approximately 25% of this region's population (1,351,000 people) but were the majority within this country's capital, Lviv. Within several weeks, the Poles of Lviv successfully rebelled against the West Ukrainian government. The rest of the territory would be captured during an offensive of the Polish–Ukrainian War by the Polish Armed Forces entering these lands from Poland, in July 1919.

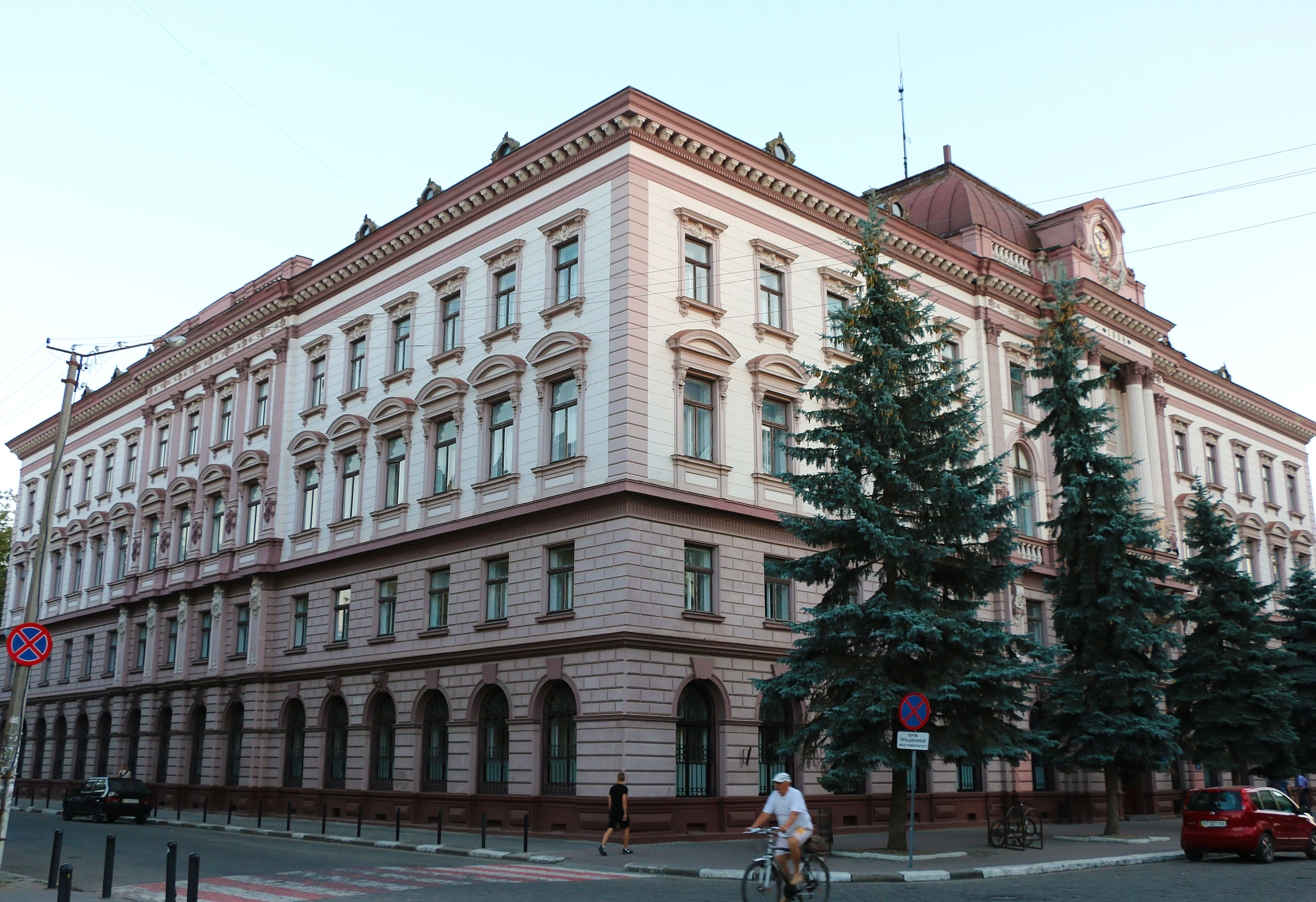
Seat of the pre-war Polish Stanisławów Voivodeship administration in Ivano-Frankivsk (formerly Polish Stanisławów)

=== History after World War I ===
The lands that are currently western Ukraine were part of the Second Polish Republic during the Interwar period. In this territory, the population of Poles ranged from 17% in the Wołyń Voivodeship (1921–1939) to 58% in the Lwów Voivodeship. Altogether, Poles in these lands made around 35% of total population, around 3 million people.

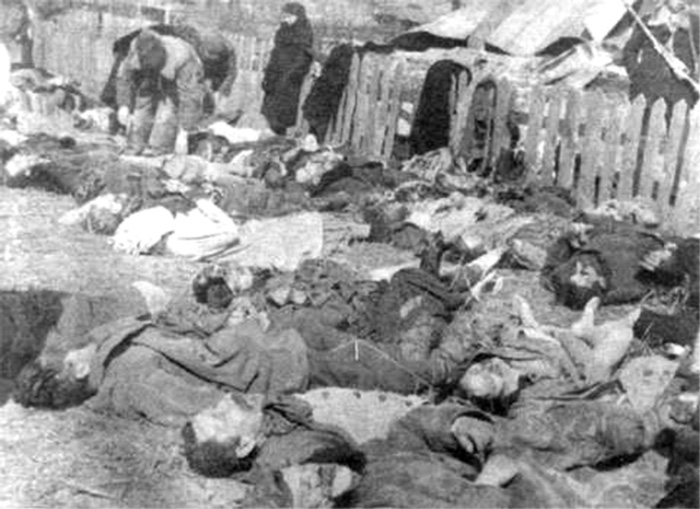
Victims of a massacre committed by UPA in the village of Lipniki in Volhynia as part of the genocide of Poles, 1943

This large Polish population dramatically decreased in the late 1930s and 1940s after the Soviet occupation of eastern Poland (see: Soviet invasion of Poland), as a result of Soviet mass deportation of Poles to Siberia and other eastern regions of the USSR as well as a campaign of ethnic cleansing, carried out by the nationalist Ukrainian Insurgent Army (see: Massacres of Poles in Volhynia and Eastern Galicia). After the Soviet Union recaptured Ukraine, Joseph Stalin and Soviet Ukrainian First Secretary Nikita Khrushchev pursued increasingly repressive policies towards Poles to force them to relocate to the Polish People's Republic.

In the Ukrainian SSR east of the Zbruch river, in 1926 there were 476.435 Poles, which was 1.6% of total population of Soviet Ukraine. Of these, 48.8% listed Ukrainian as their native language. In the Ukrainian SSR there was a Polish Autonomous District#Marchlewszczyzna, near Zhytomyr, created in 1926, but it was disbanded in 1935 and its Polish inhabitants were either murdered or deported to Kazakhstan. Actually, the former Polish Autonomous District is a territory with largest ethnic Poles concentration in Ukraine, the former Polish Autonomous District capital Dovbysh population is predominantly Polish and Catholic.

In the 1937-8 Polish Operation of the NKVD, 55,928 people were arrested in the Ukrainian Soviet Socialist Republic, of which 47,327 were shot and 8,601 were sent to gulags. Not all of those arrested were Polish. The Polish population in the Ukrainian SSR fell from 417,613 in 1937 to 357,710 in 1939.

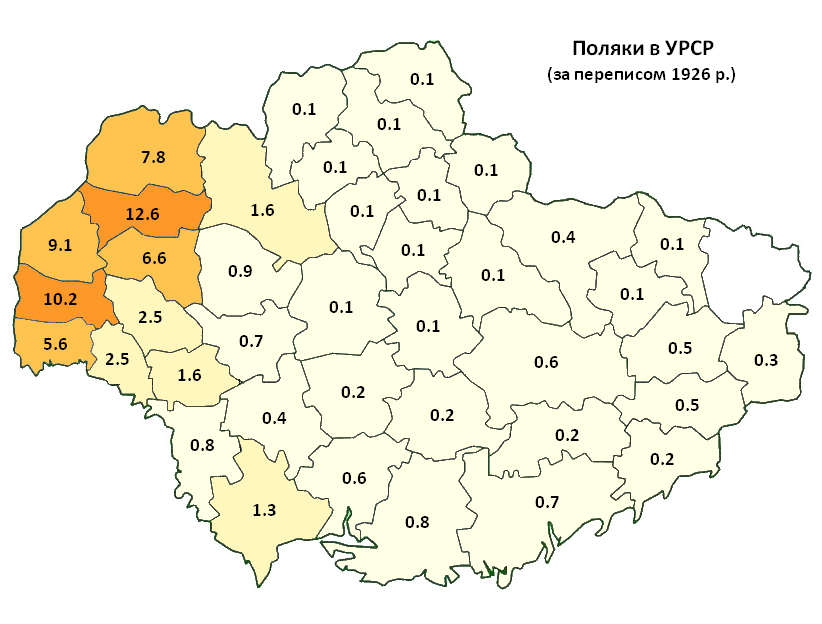
Map showing percentage of population who are of Polish origin in the Ukrainian SSR, 1926

That number has been steadily decreasing over the past half a century; the censuses of Soviet Ukraine gave the following numbers: 1959 – 363,000; 1970 – 295,000; 1979 – 258,000 and 1989 – 219,000. This decline can be explained due to policies of Sovietization, which aimed to destroy Polish culture on Soviet Ukraine.

As most Poles from the Polish areas annexed by the Soviet Union were transported to Poland (primarily Regained Territories), there were actually relatively few Poles left on the former southeastern territories of the Second Polish Republic incorporated into Soviet Union.

The majority of Poles in Ukraine assimilated into the Ukrainian culture. By 1959, 69% spoke the Ukrainian language, 19 percent spoke Polish and 12 percent spoke Russian.

== Poles in contemporary Ukraine ==
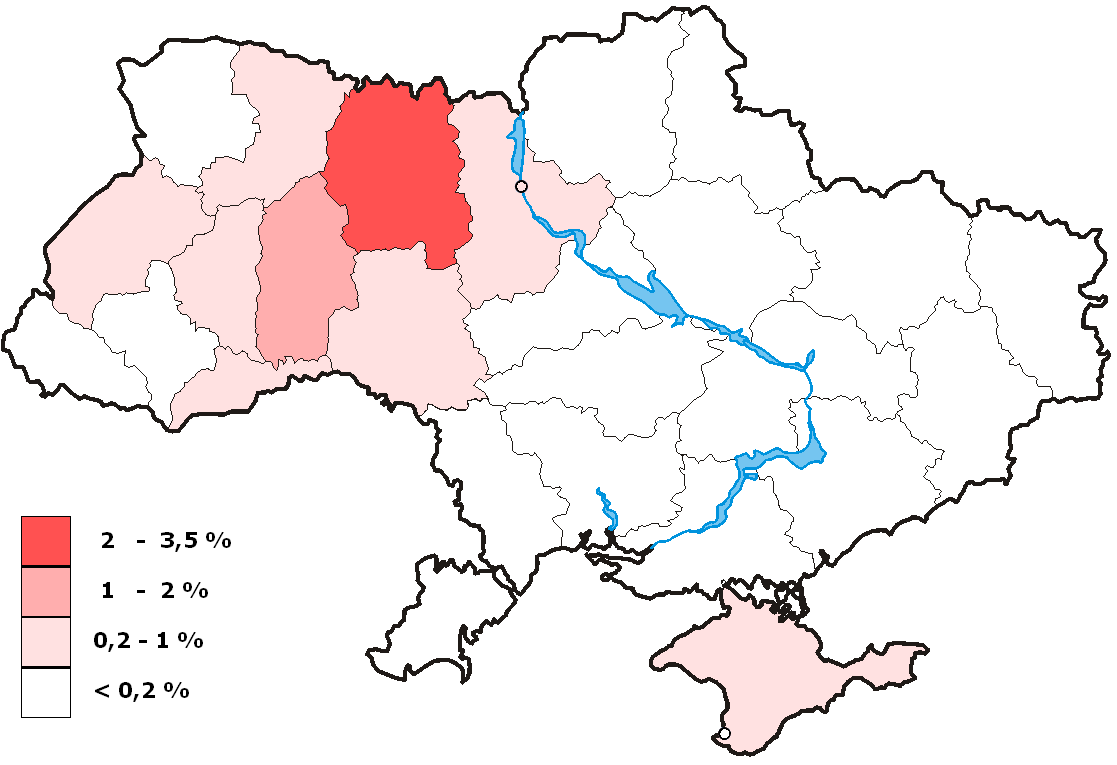
Map showing percentage of population who are of Polish origin in Ukraine, 2001

The situation of Polish minority has improved when Ukraine regained independence, the policy of Sovietization ended and various Polish non-governmental organizations were allowed to operate. On October 13, 1990, Poland and Ukraine agreed to the "Declaration on the foundations and general directions in the development of Polish–Ukrainian relations". Article 3 of this declaration said that neither country has any territorial claims against the other, and will not bring any in the future. Both countries promised to respect the rights of national minorities in the land and to improve the situation of minorities in their countries. This declaration re-affirmed the historic and ethnic ties between Poland and Ukraine, containing a reference to "the ethnic and cultural kinship of the Polish and Ukrainian peoples". Under the "Declaration of rights of nationalities of Ukraine" (approved November 7, 1991) Poles, as minorities, were guaranteed political, economic, social, and cultural rights. The Polish minority in Ukraine were and have been active supporters of Ukrainian independence; they supported Viktor Yushchenko over Viktor Yanukovych virtually as a bloc in the disputed 2004 election.

The number of Poles in Ukraine declined after Ukraine's independence, with a total number of 144,130 counted in the census of 2001. Most Poles who remained in Ukraine were and are concentrated in Zhytomyr Oblast (about 49,000), Khmelnytskyi Oblast (about 20,000), and Lviv Oblast (about 19,000). However, the official 2001 census numbers are highly controversial and questioned by many (for example, the Union of Poles in Ukraine, Roman Catholic Church in Ukraine and even Polish Consulate General in Lviv) who allege that the real number of Poles and Polish descendants living in Ukraine is up to 2 million people.

== Cultural heritage ==
Polish cultural heritage in Ukraine includes:

Palaces of Polish nobility, examples:

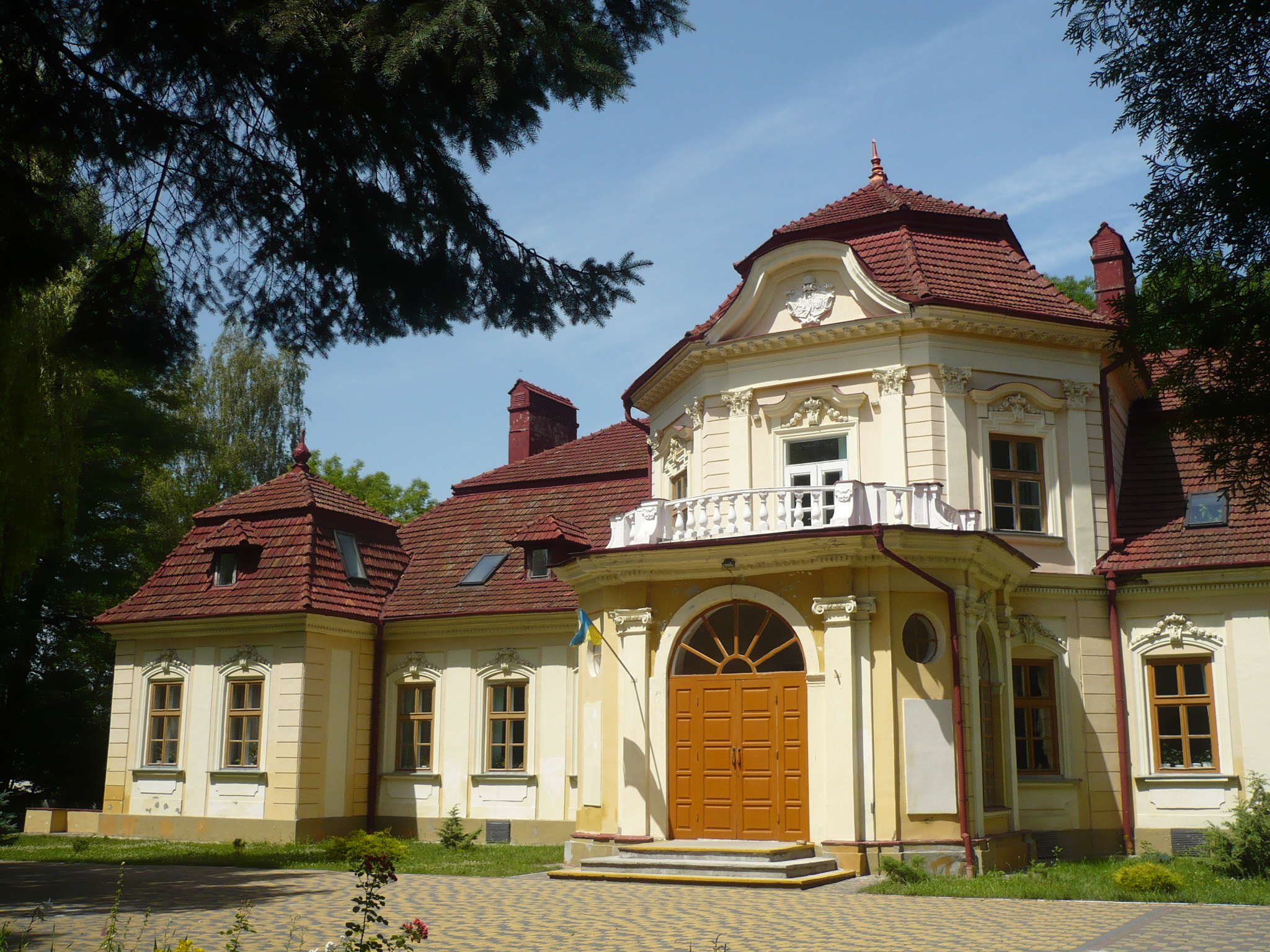
Brunicki Palace in Velykyi Liubin (17th century)

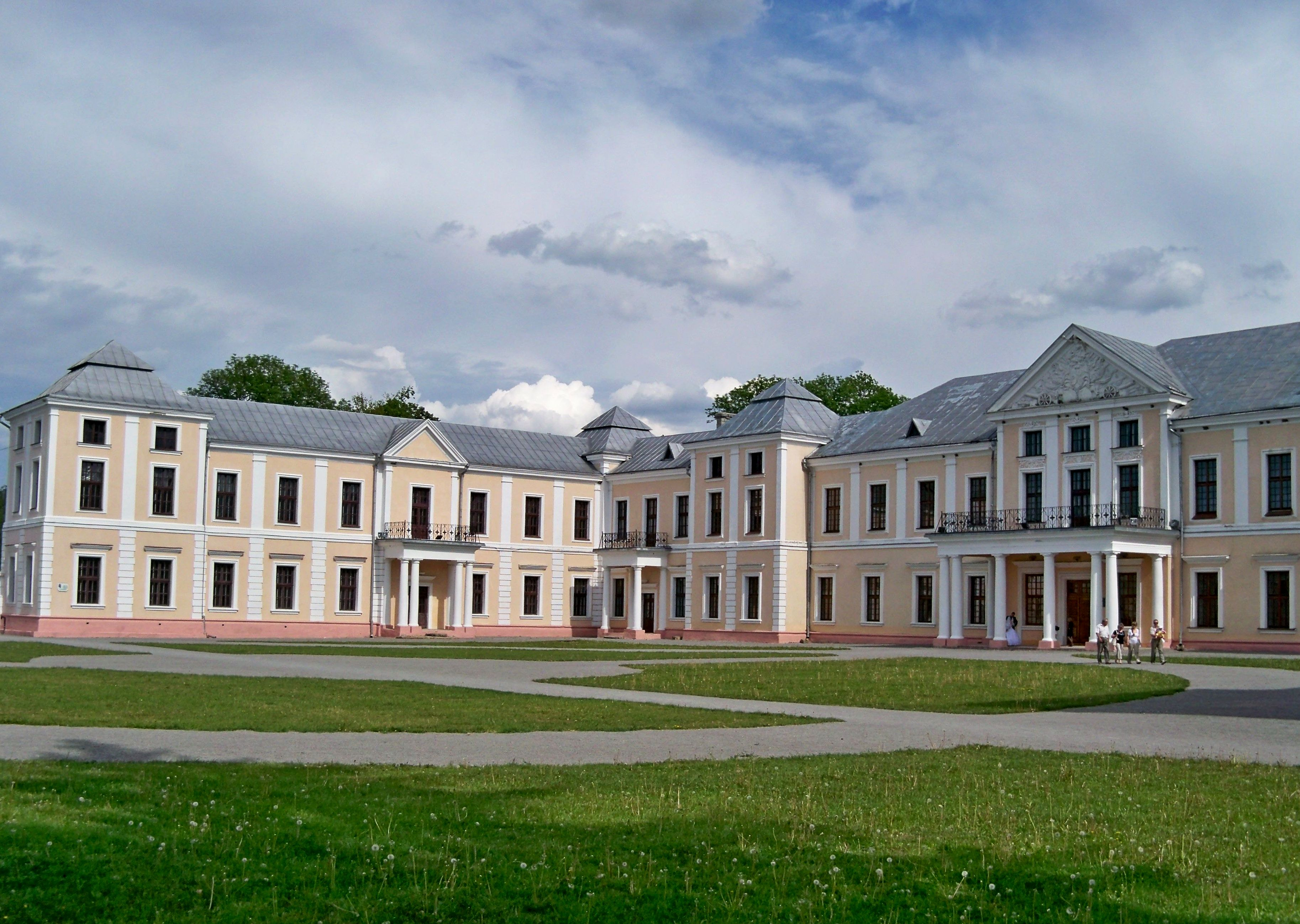
Wiśniowiecki Palace in Vyshnivets (18th century)

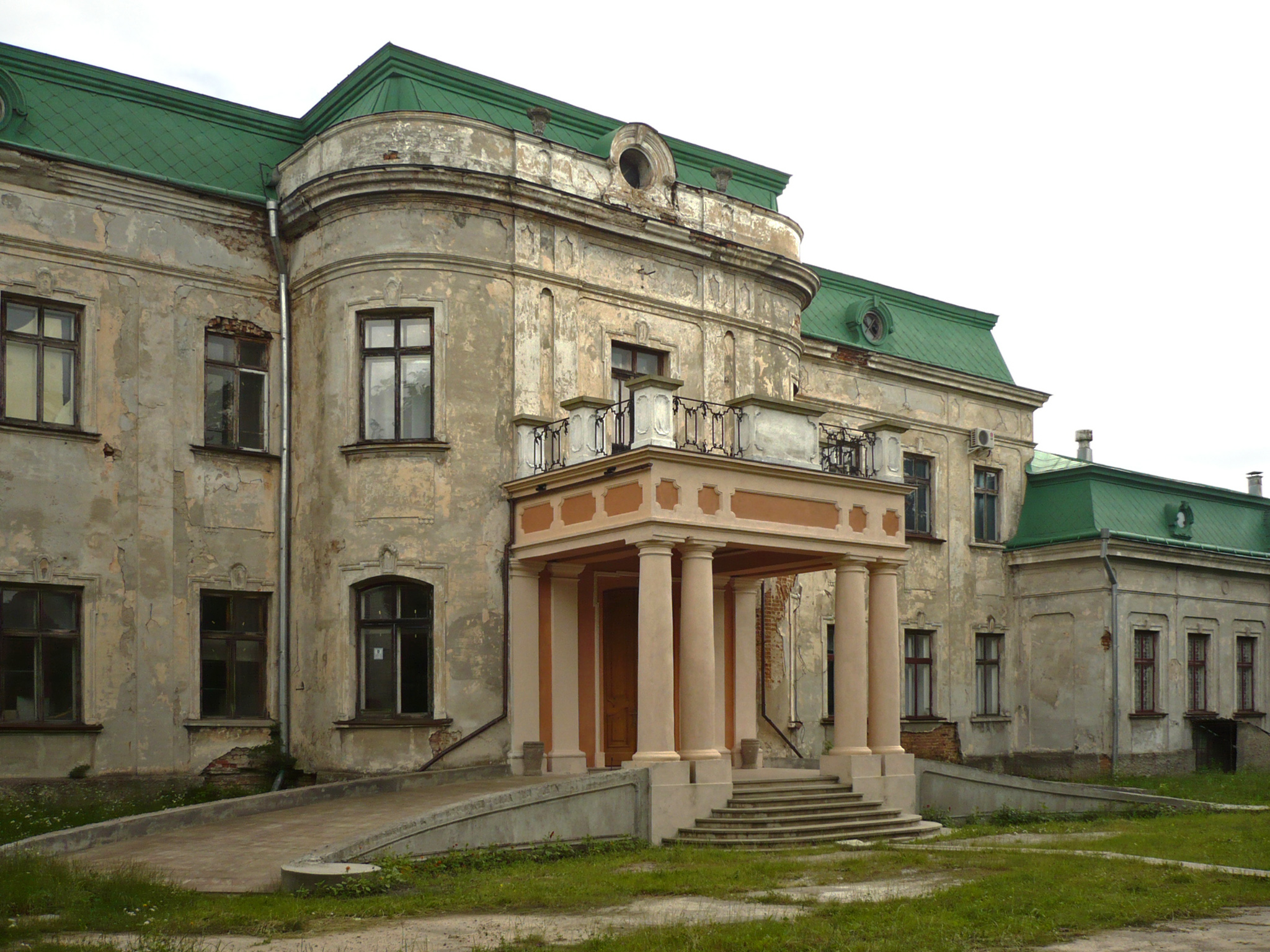
Potocki Palace in Sheptytskyi (18th century)

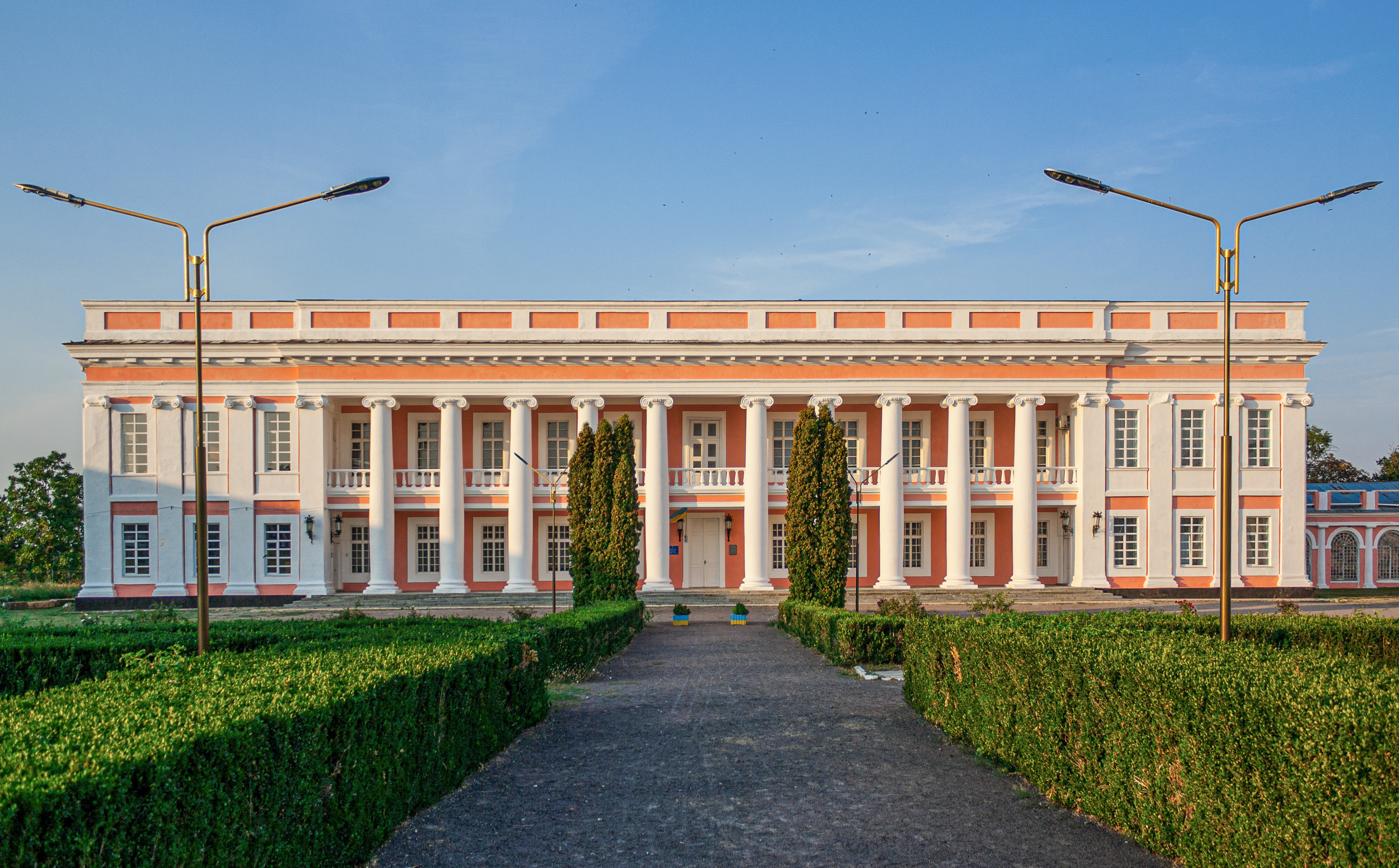
Potocki Palace in Tulchyn (18th century)

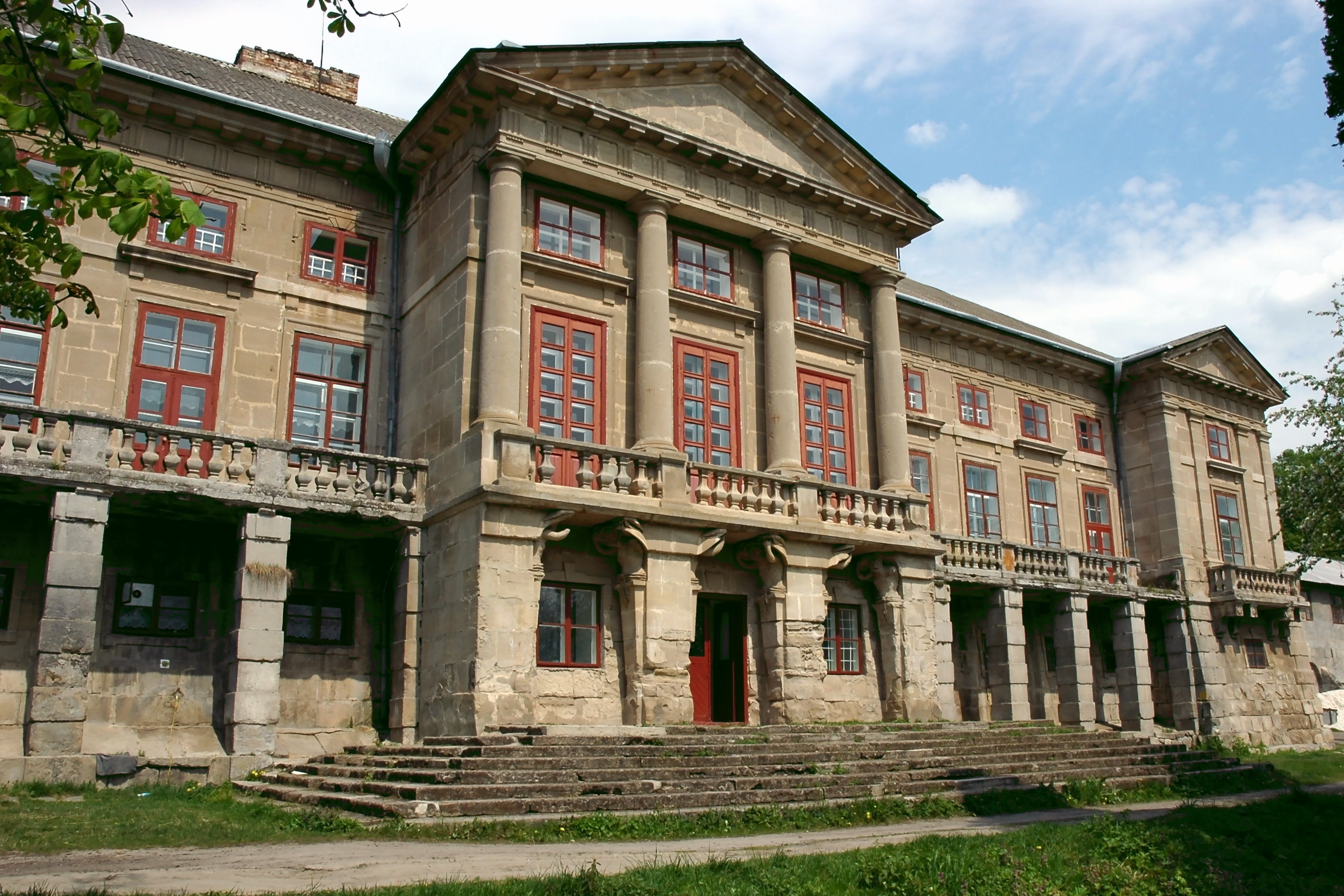
Orłowski Palace in Maliivtsi (18th century)

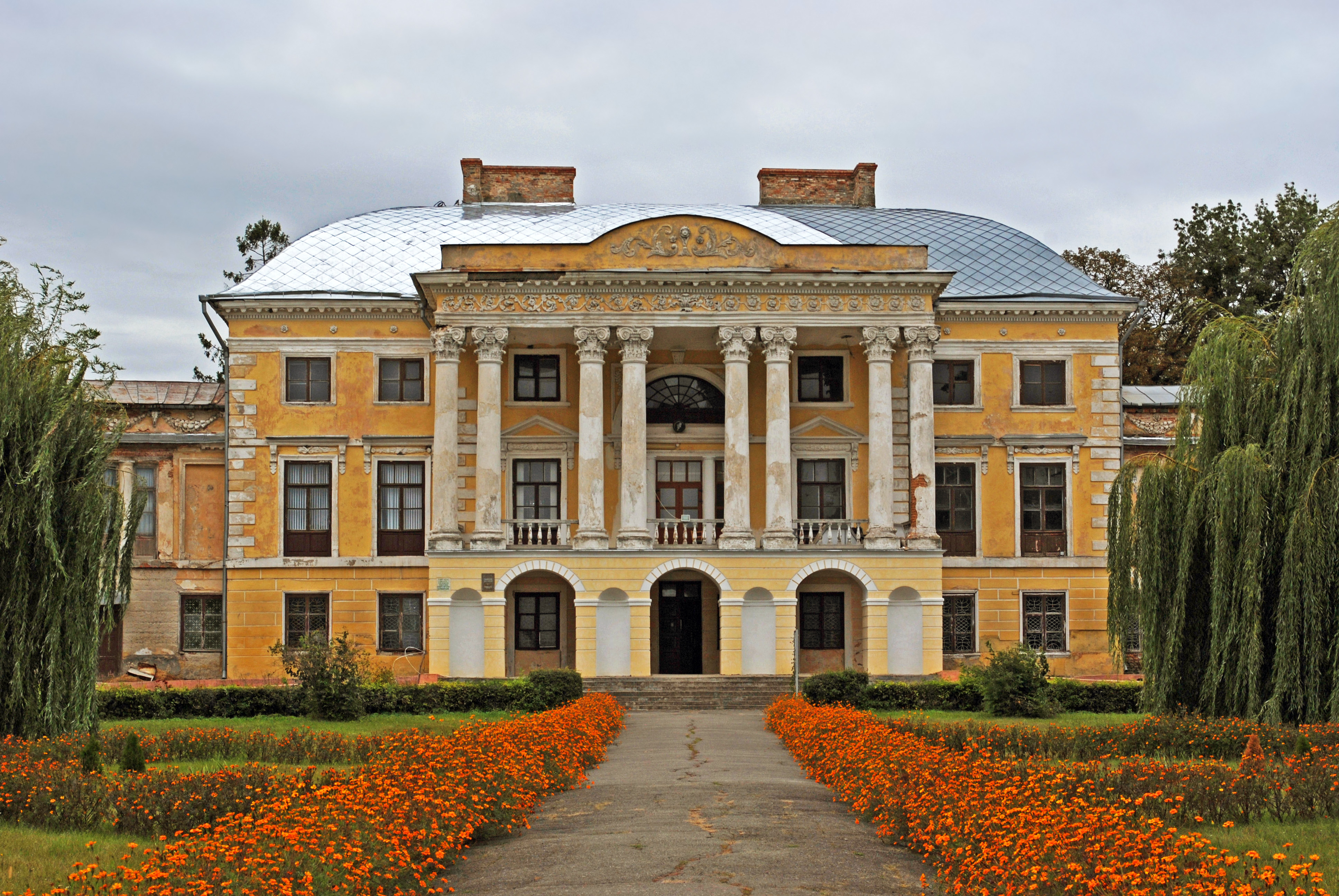
Grocholski Palace in Voronovytsia (18th century)

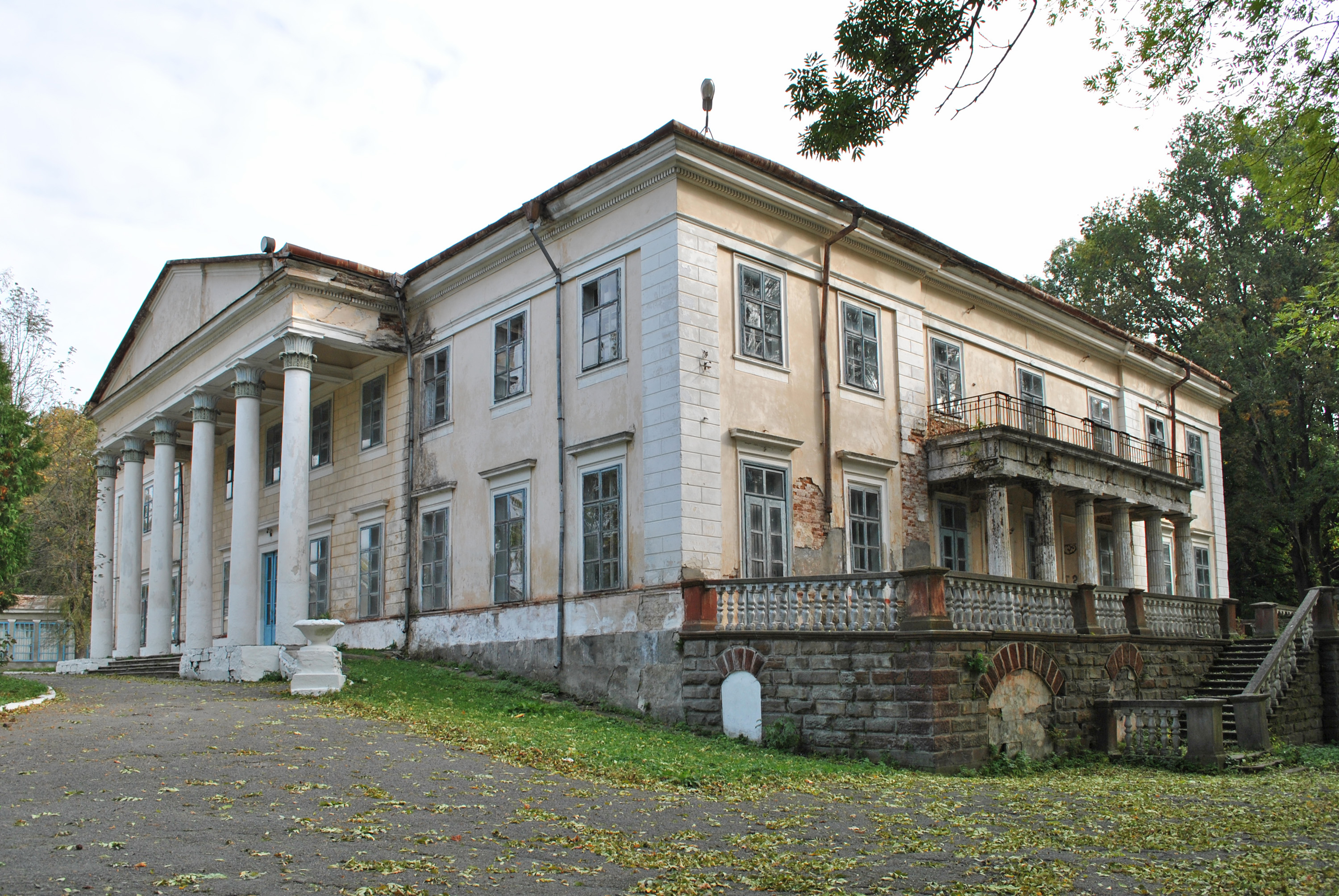
Lanckoroński Palace in Strusiv (18th century)

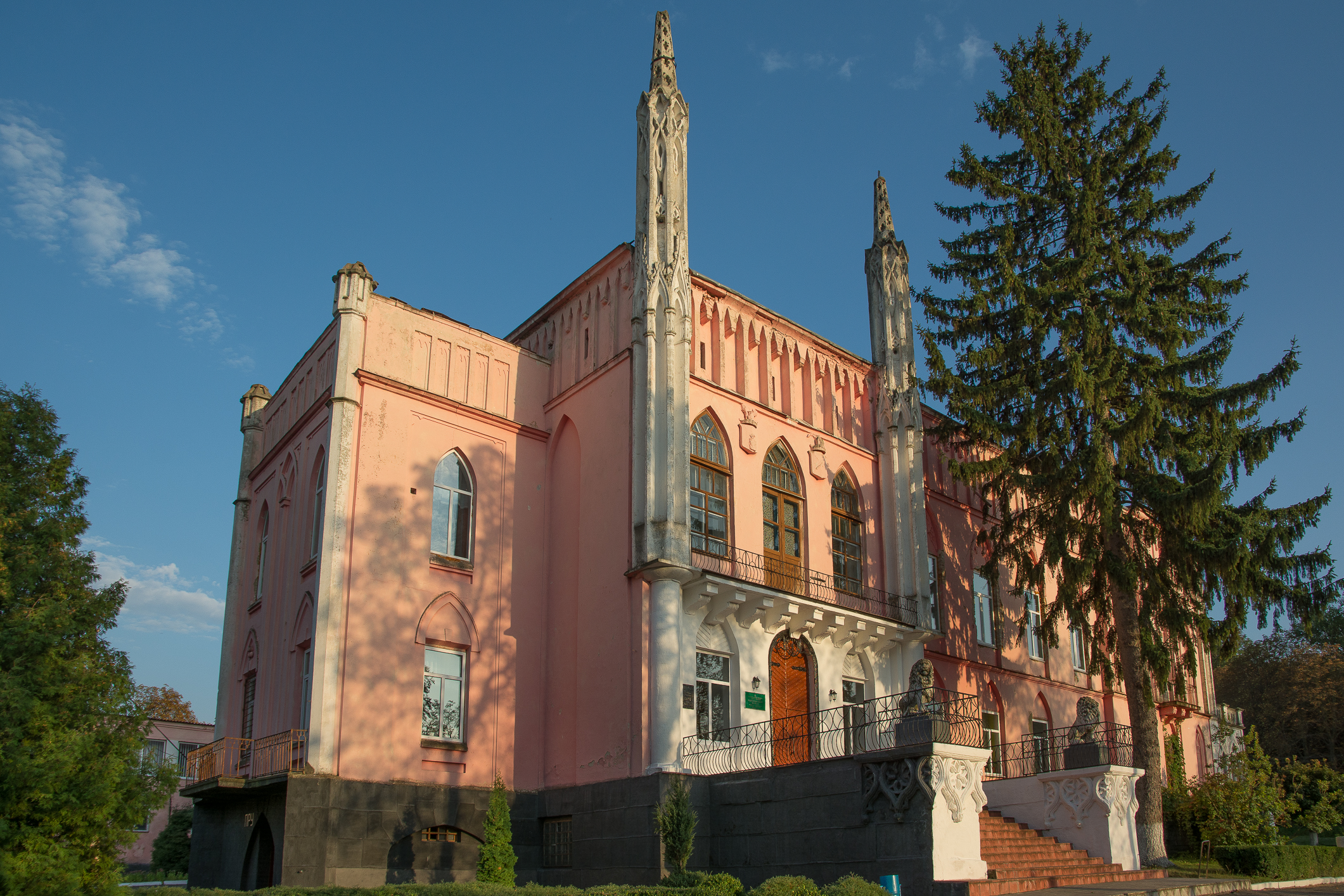
Witosławski Palace in Cherniatyn (19th century)

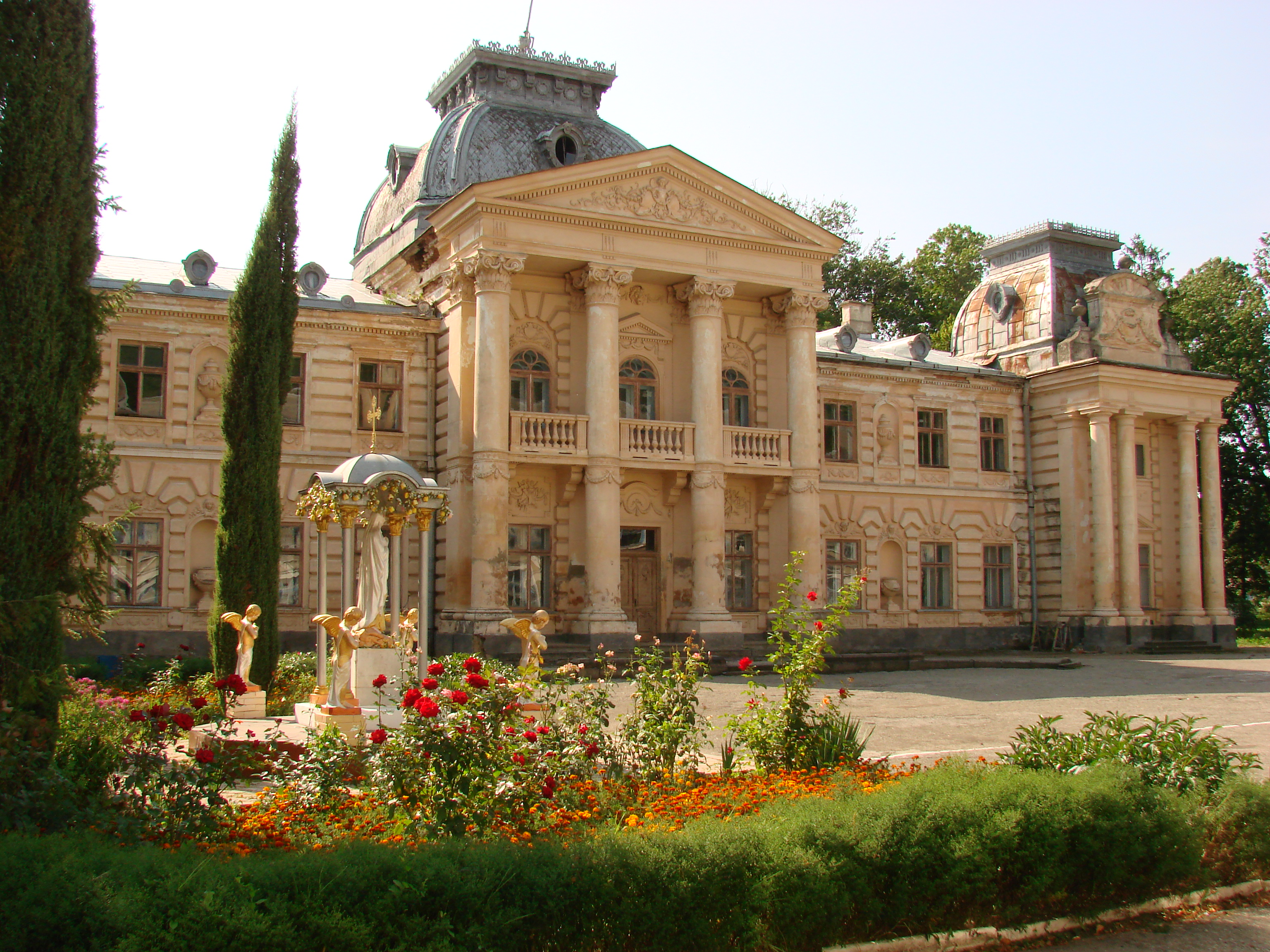
Mysłowski Palace in Koropets (19th century)

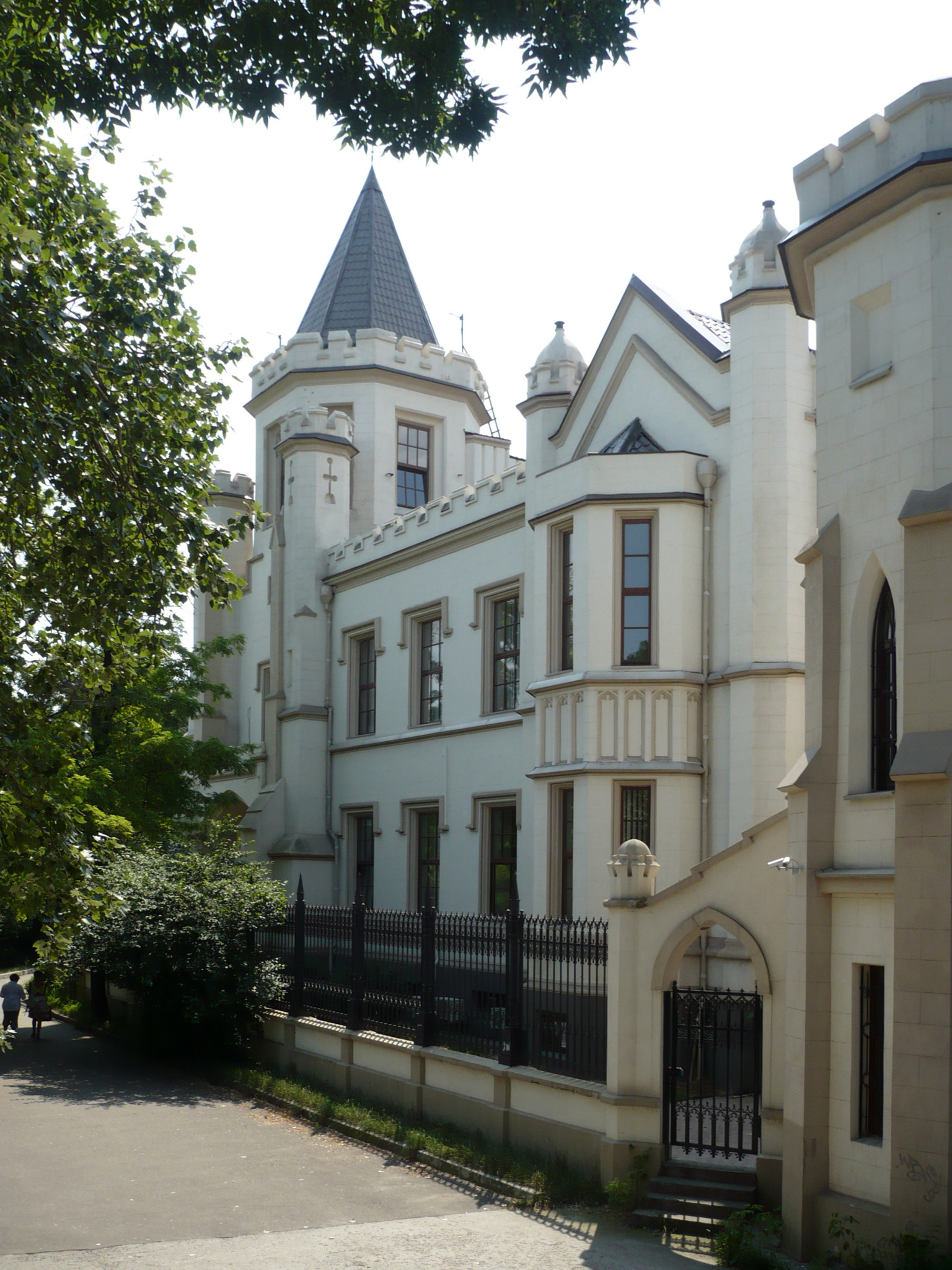
Belina-Brzozowski Palace in Odesa (19th century)

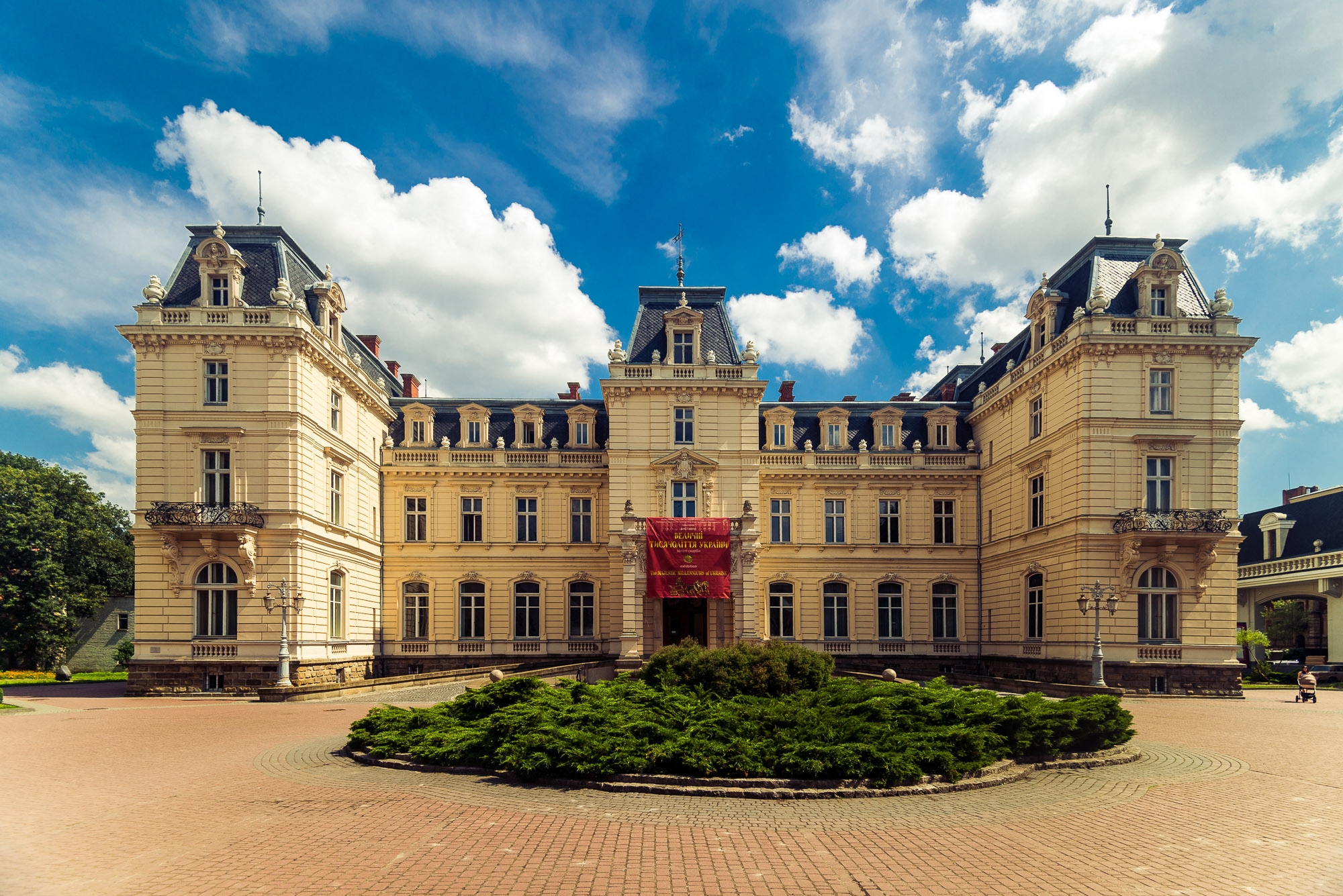
Potocki Palace in Lviv (19th century)
Former Polish cultural and educational institutions, examples:

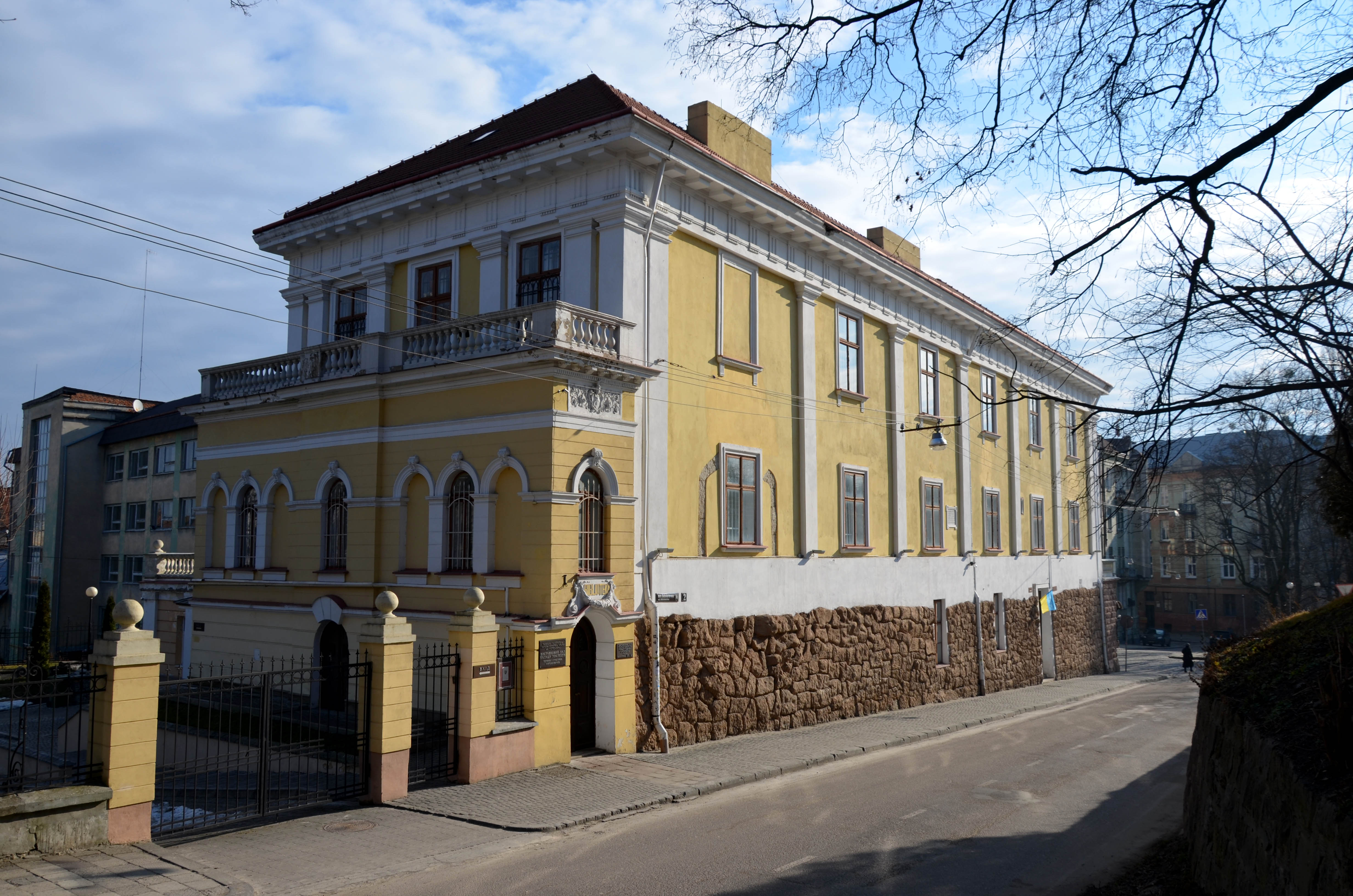
Baworowscy Library in Lviv

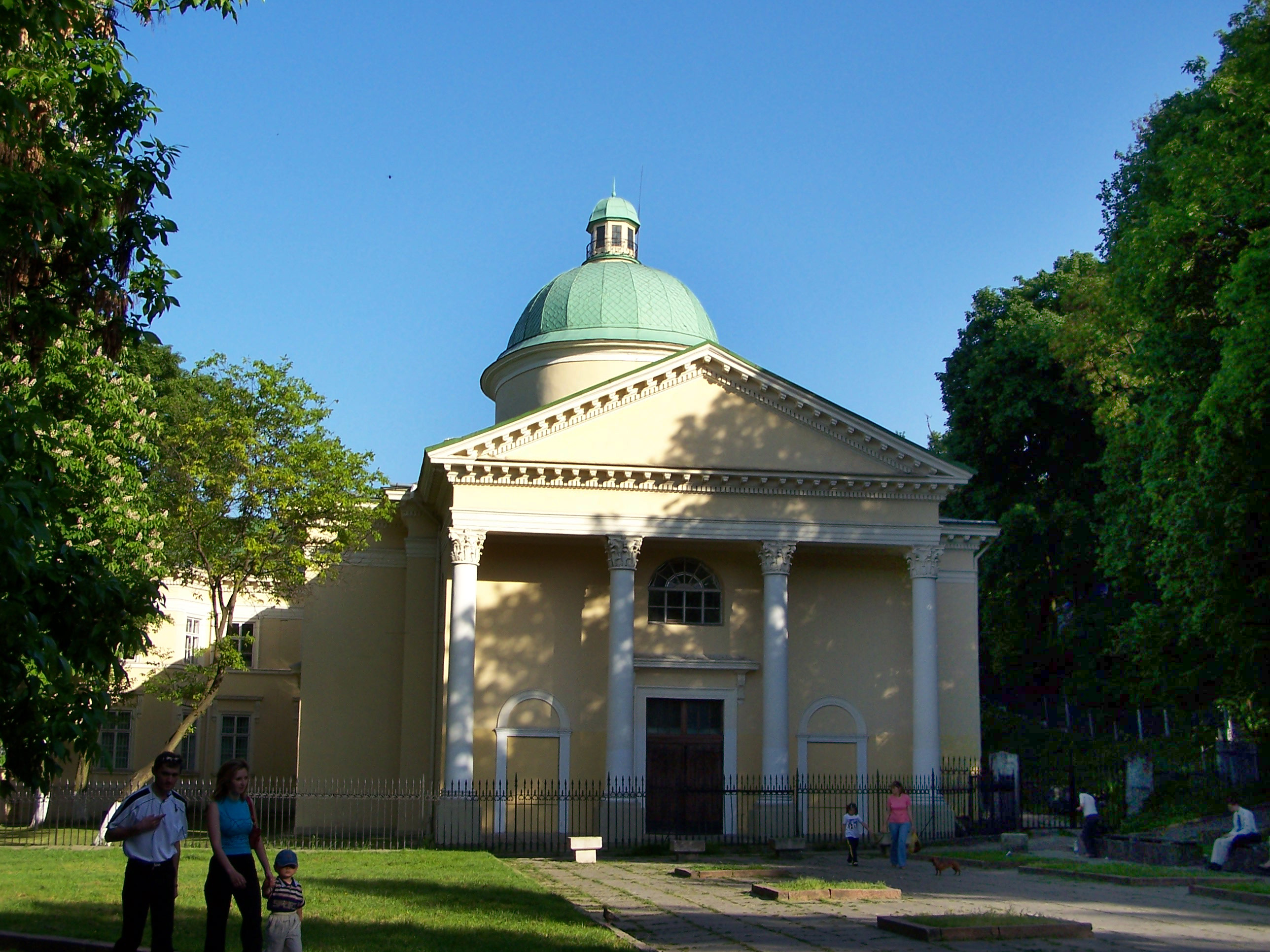
Ossolineum edifice in Lviv

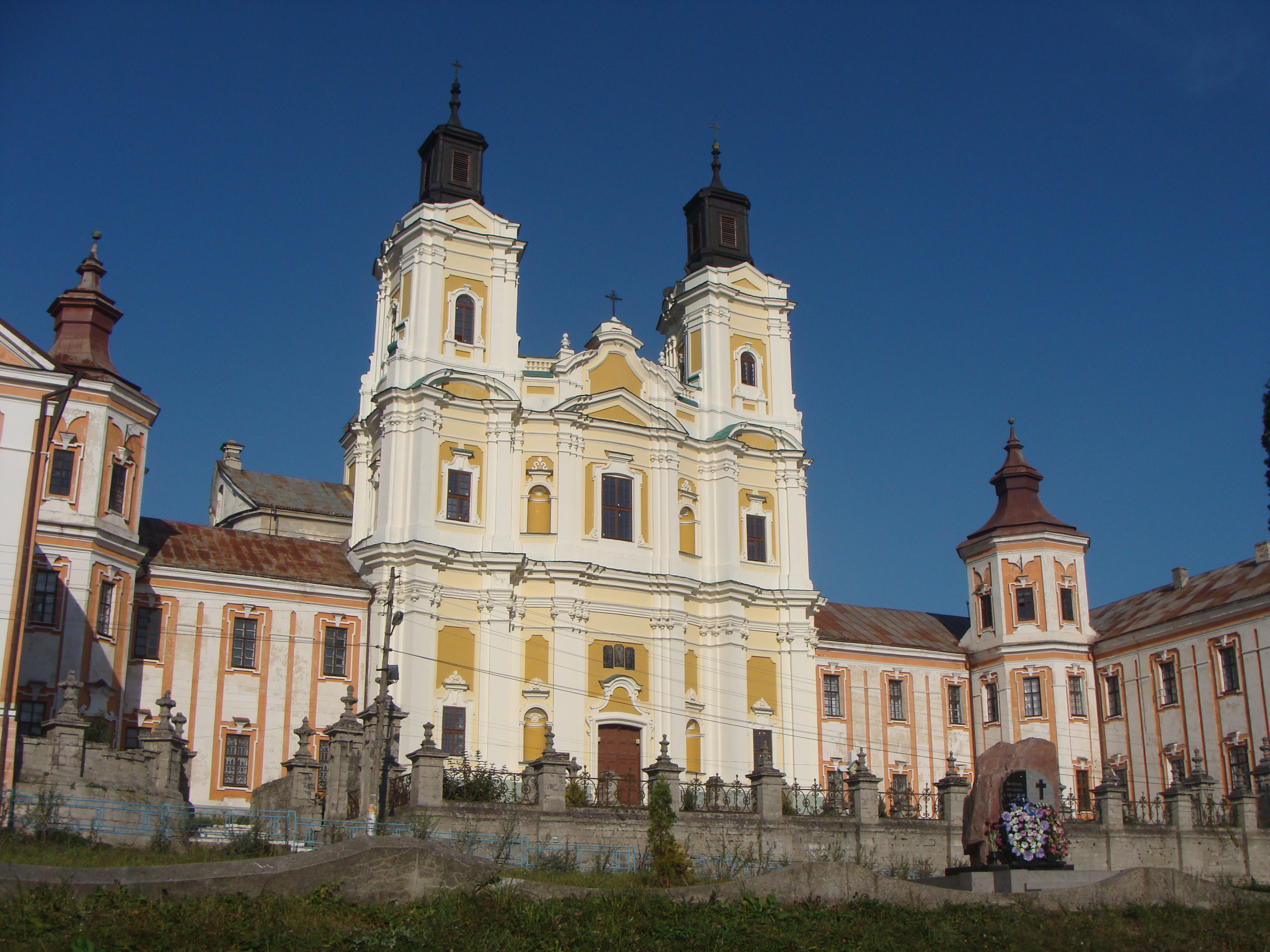
Krzemieniec Lyceum in Kremenets

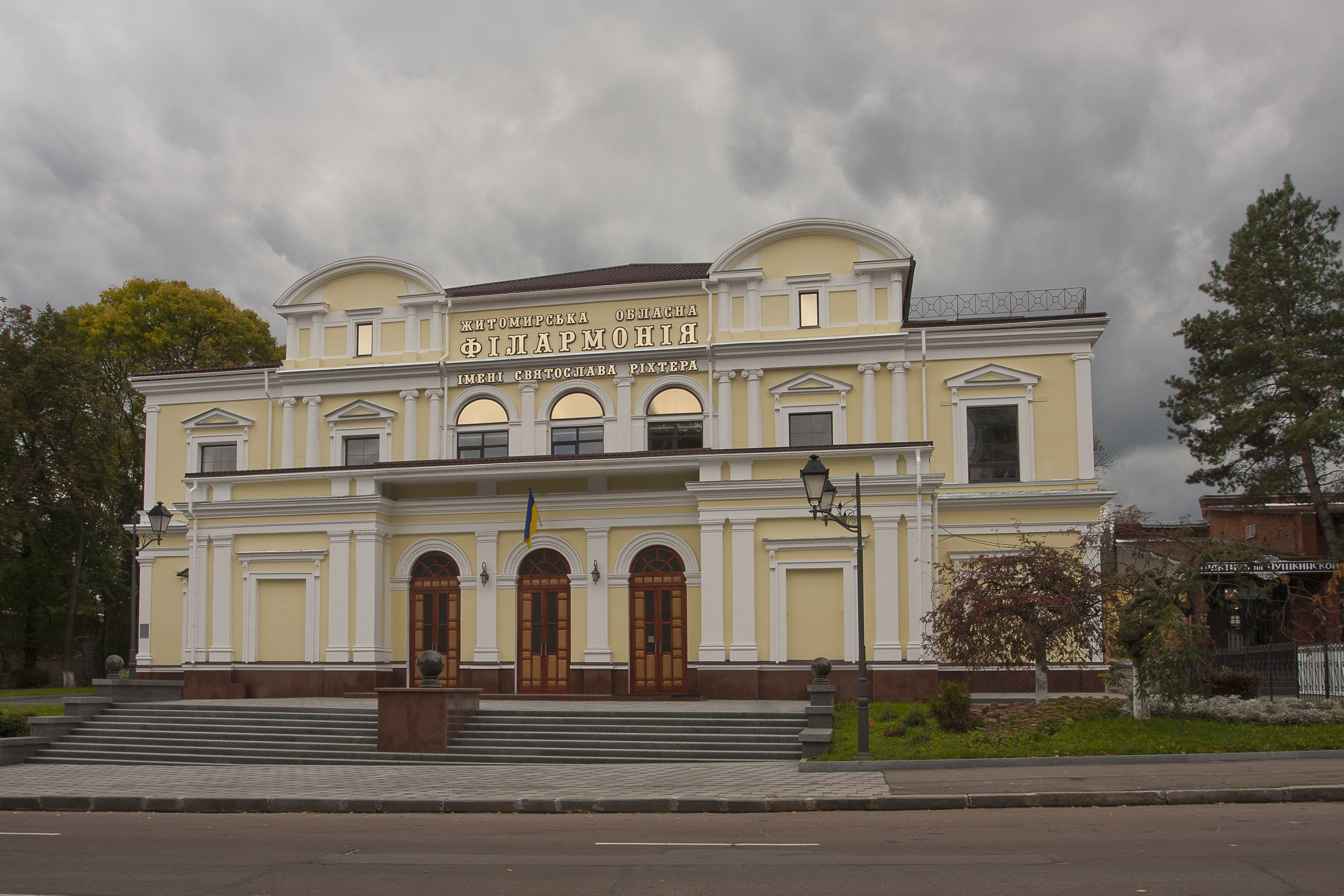
City Theatre in Zhytomyr (19th century)

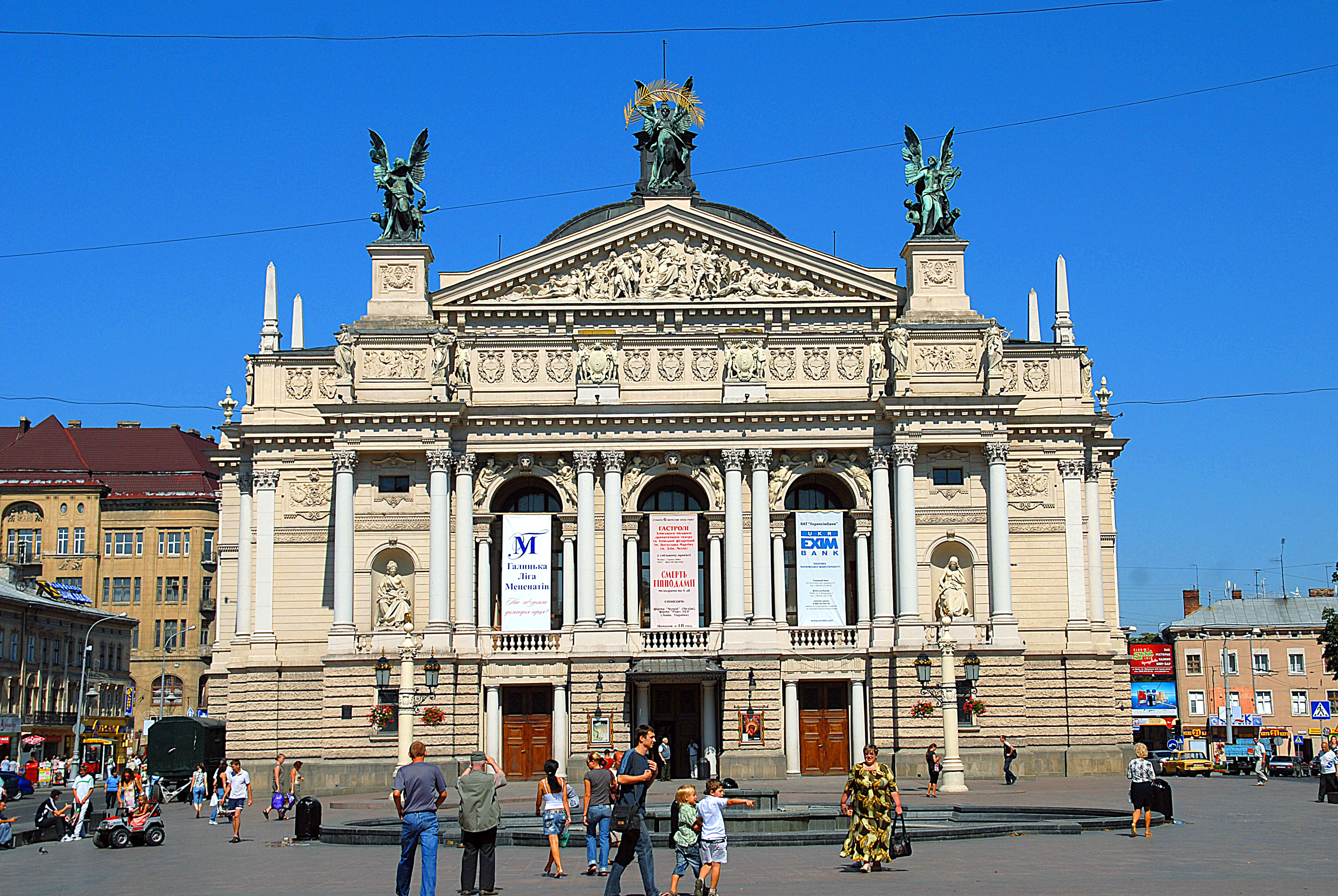
Grand Theatre in Lviv (19th century)
Polish churches, examples:

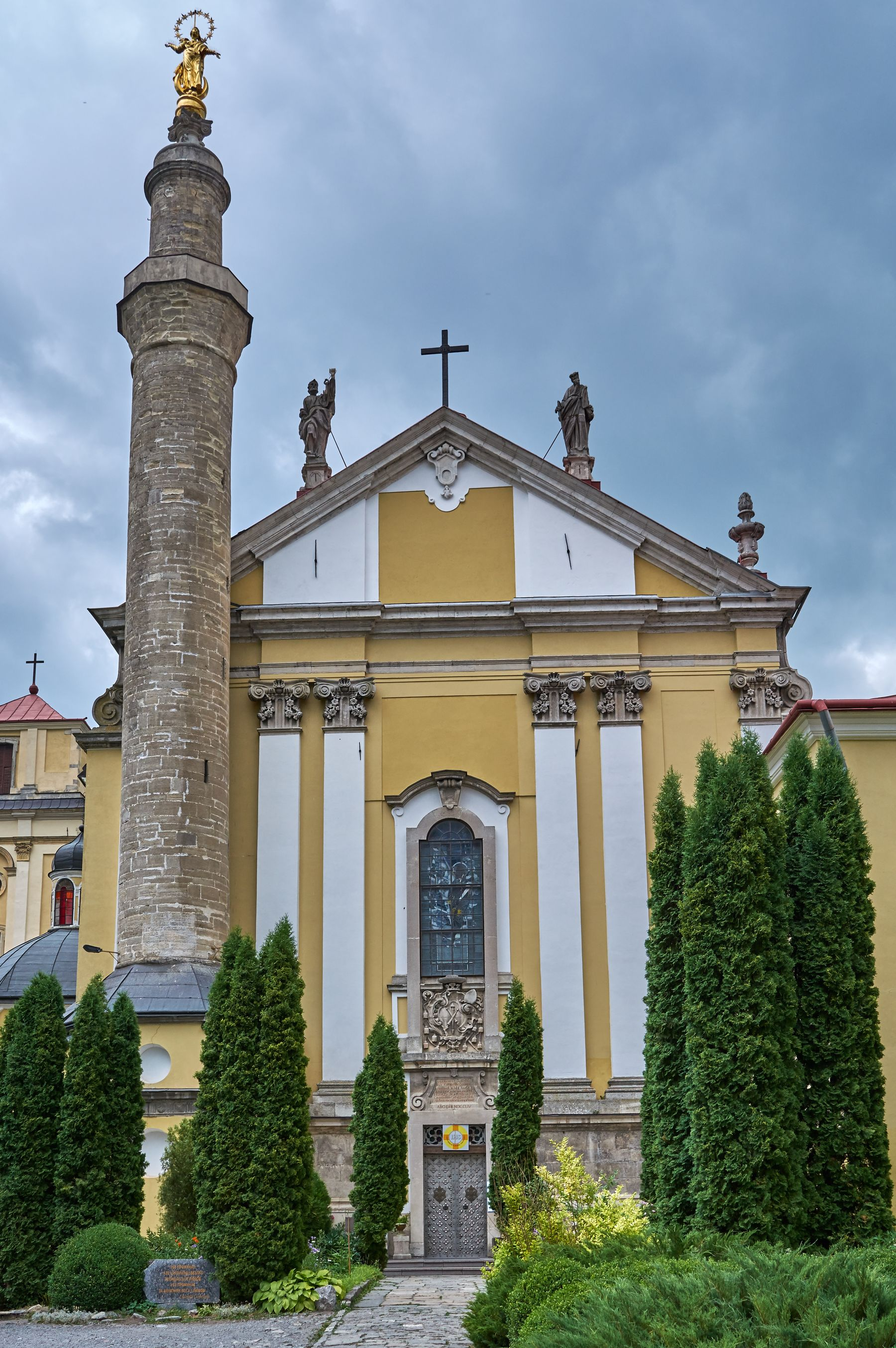
Sts. Peter and Paul Cathedral in Kamianets-Podilskyi (16th century)

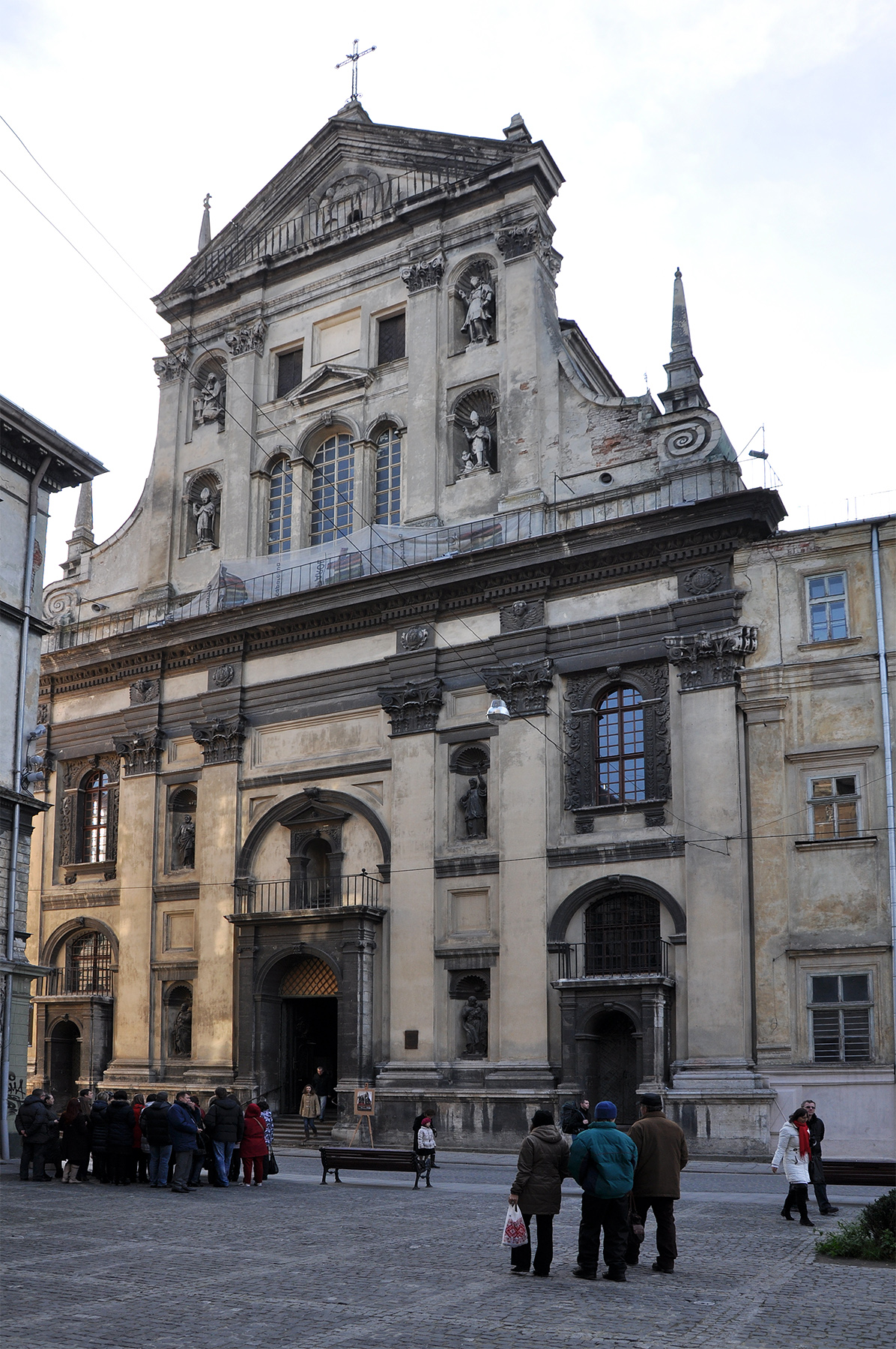
Jesuit Church in Lviv (17th century)

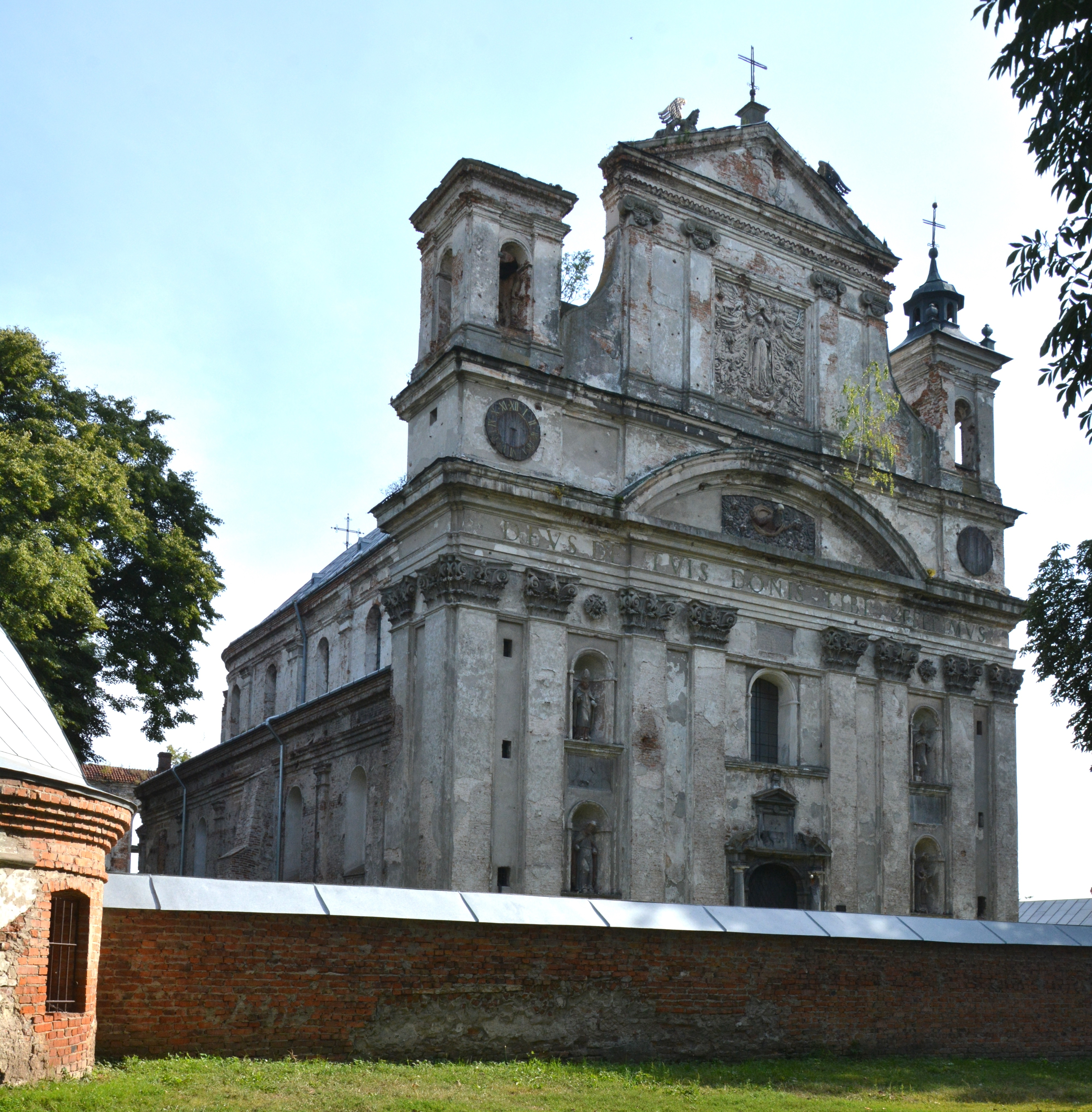
Church of the Holy Trinity in Olyka (17th century)

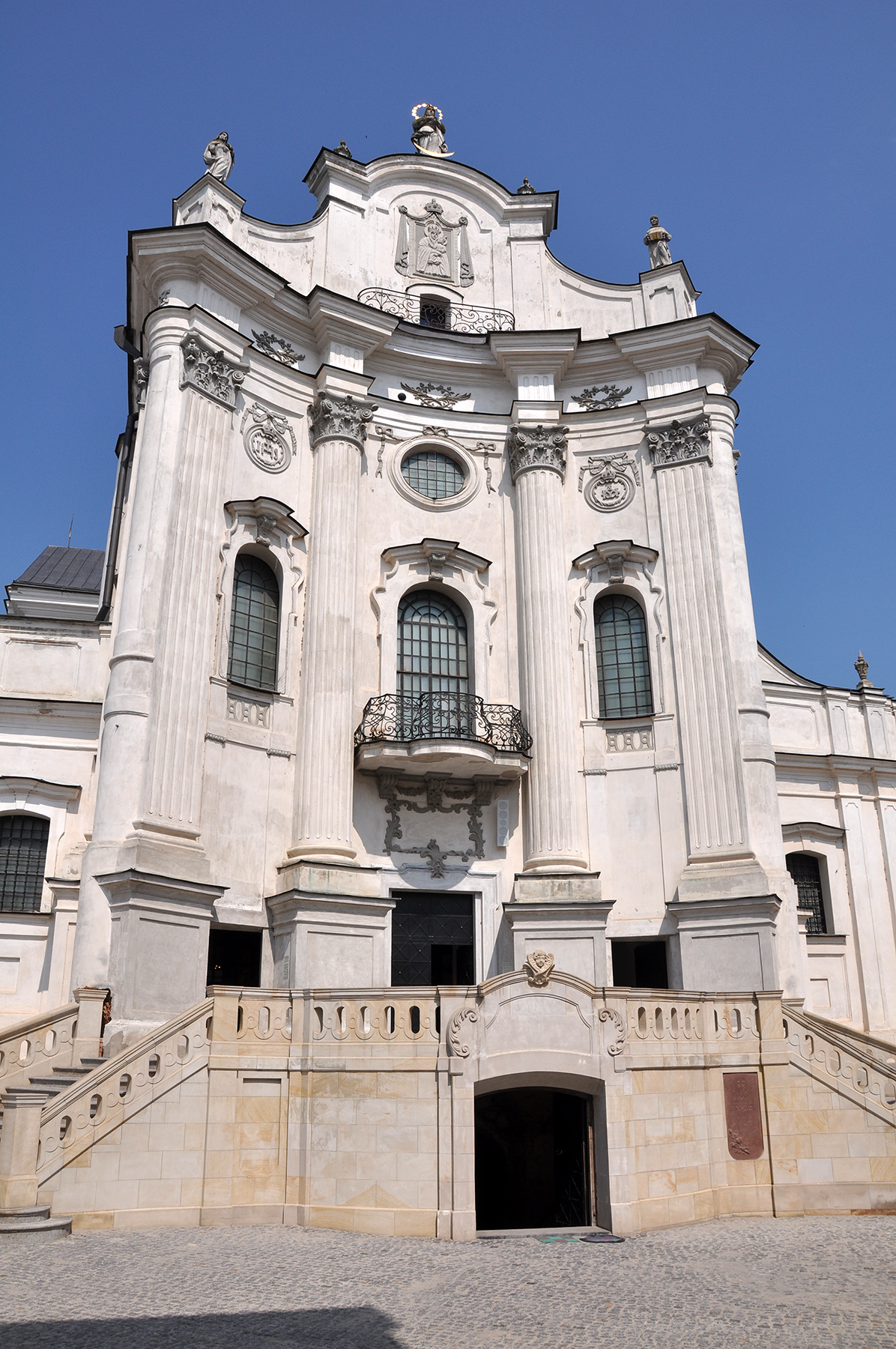
Church of the Virgin Mary in Berdychiv (18th century)

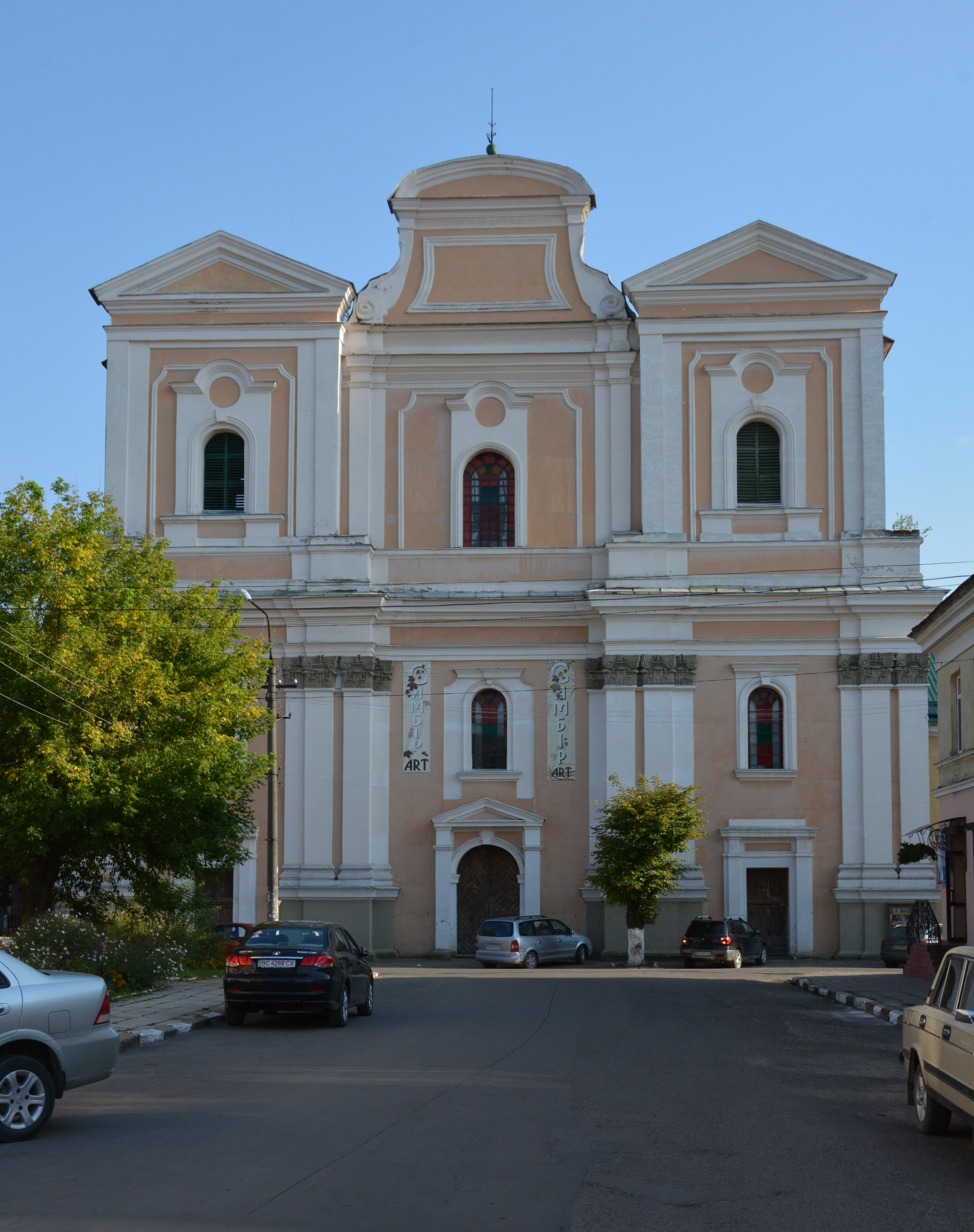
Saint Stanislav church in Sambir (18th century)

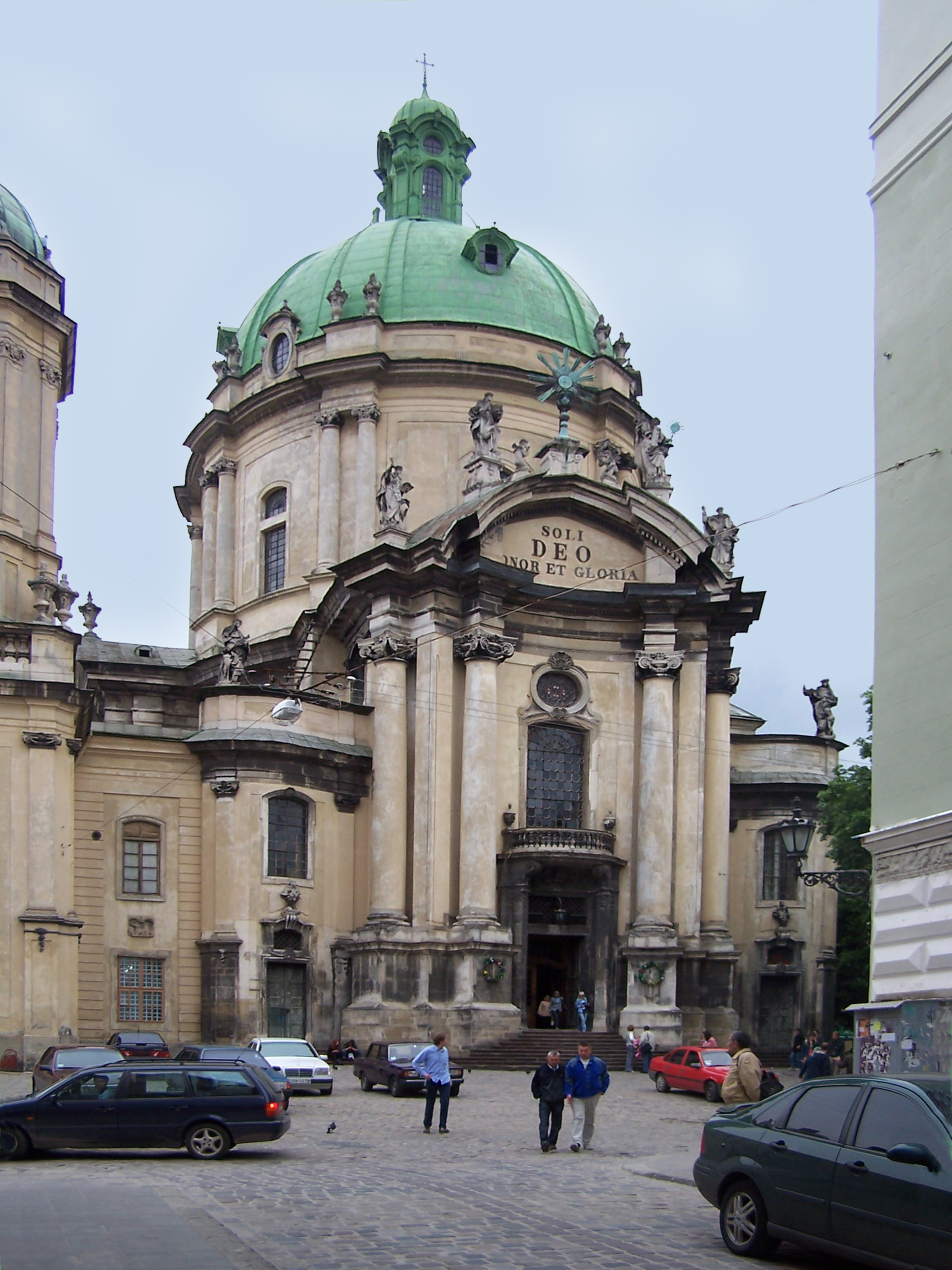
Dominican Church in Lviv (18th century)

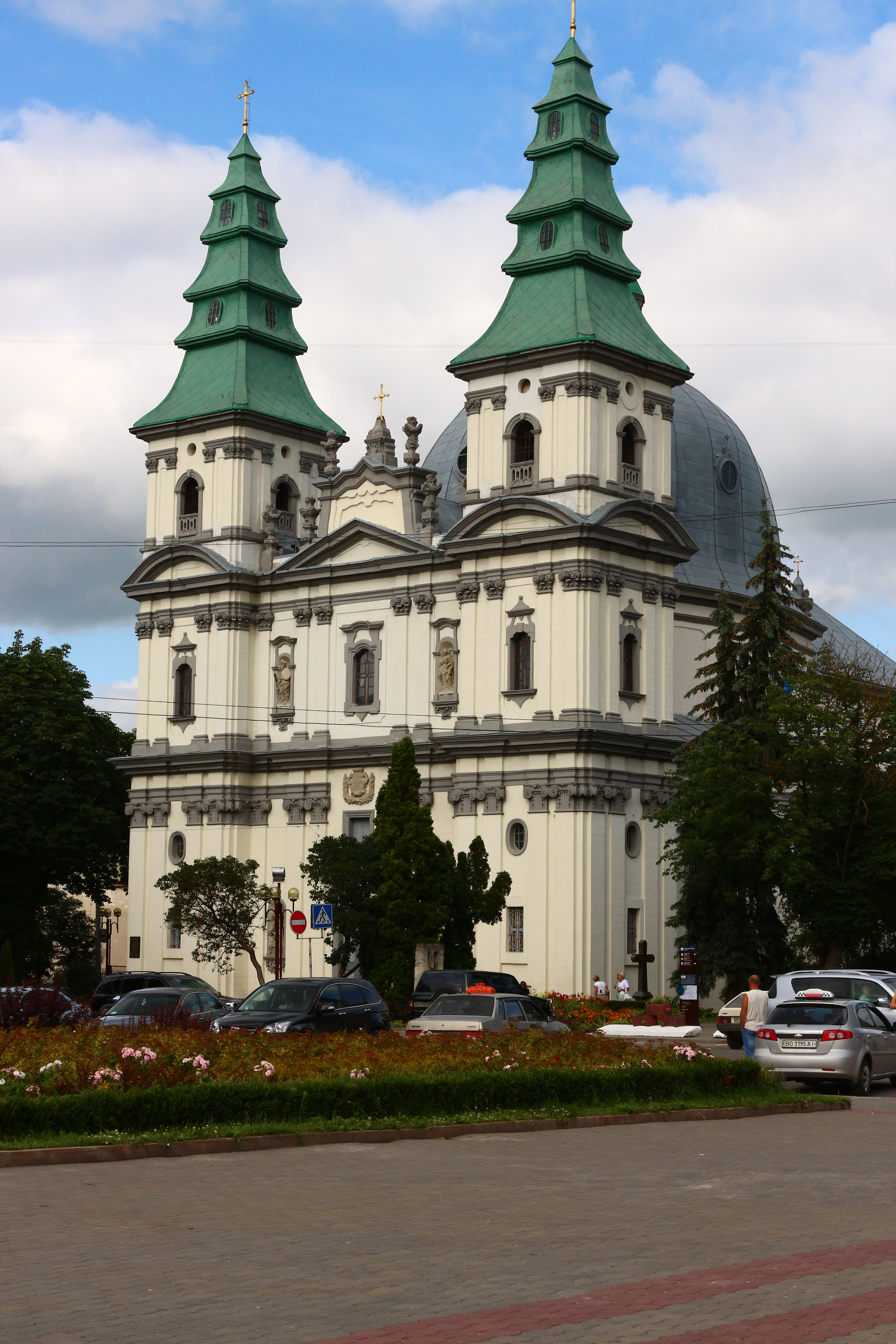
Dominican Church in Ternopil (18th century)

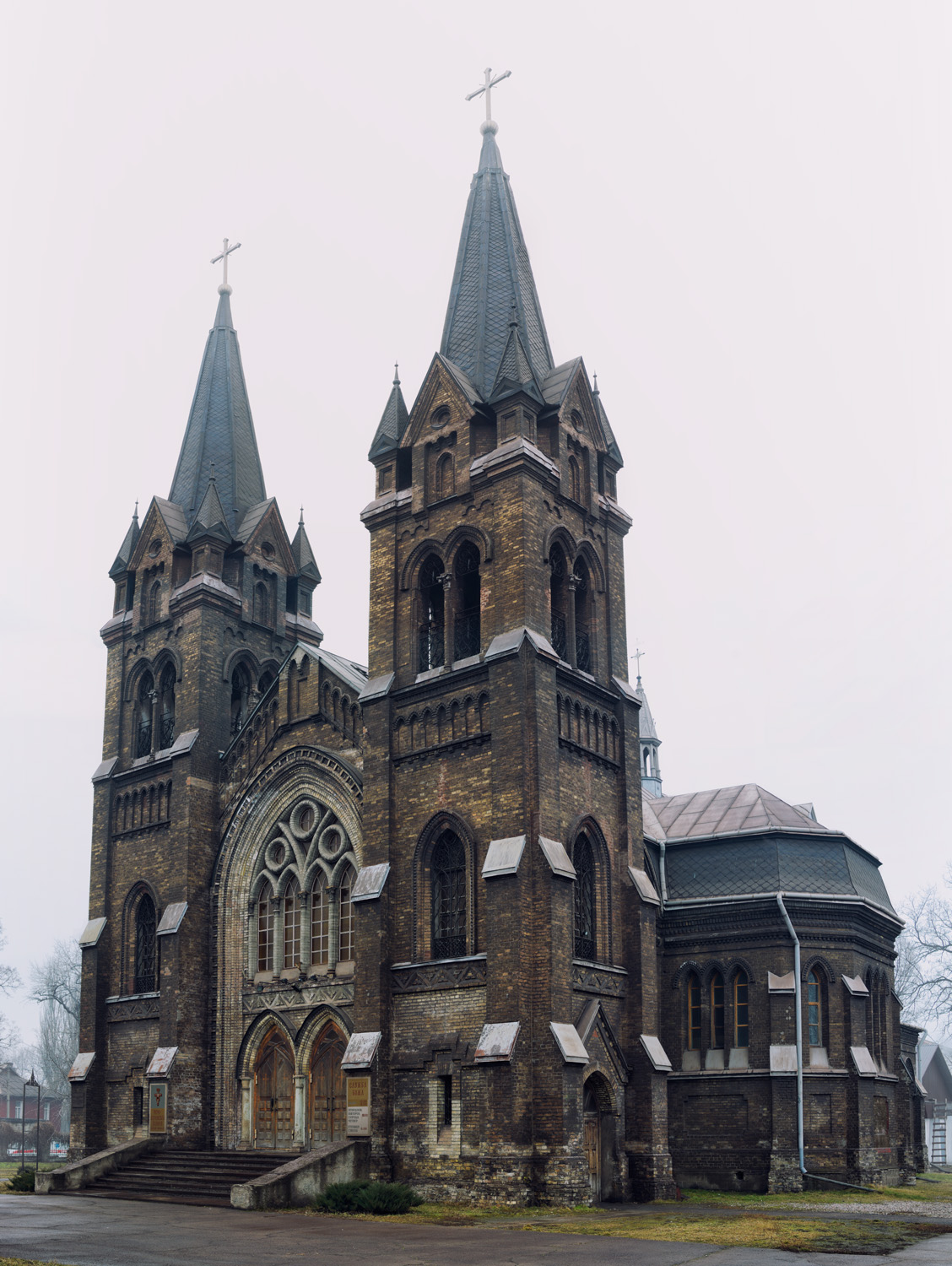
Saint Nicholas Roman Catholic Church, Kamianske (1897)

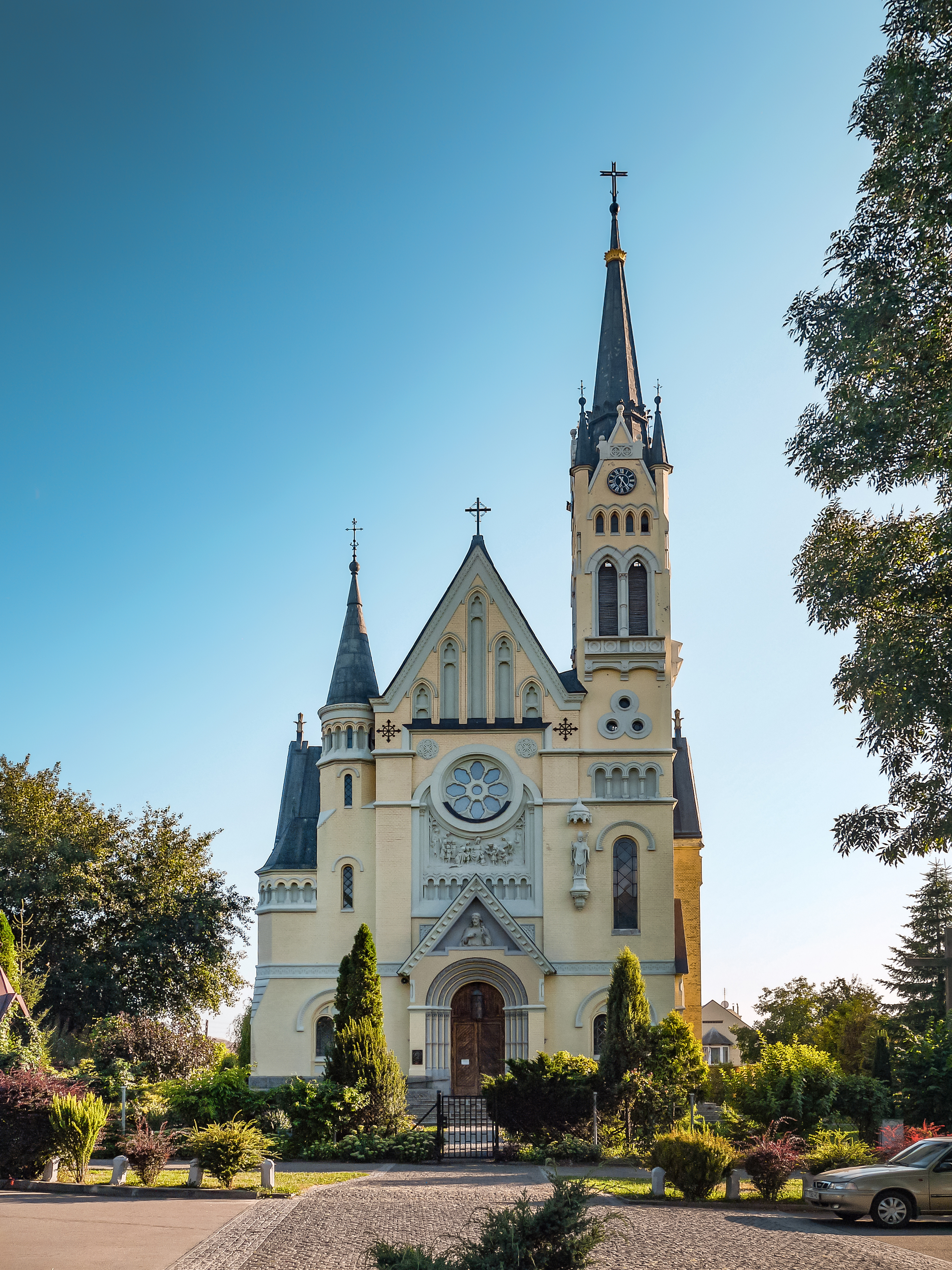
Church of the Exaltation of Holy Cross, Fastiv (1911)
Houses of famous Polish people, examples:

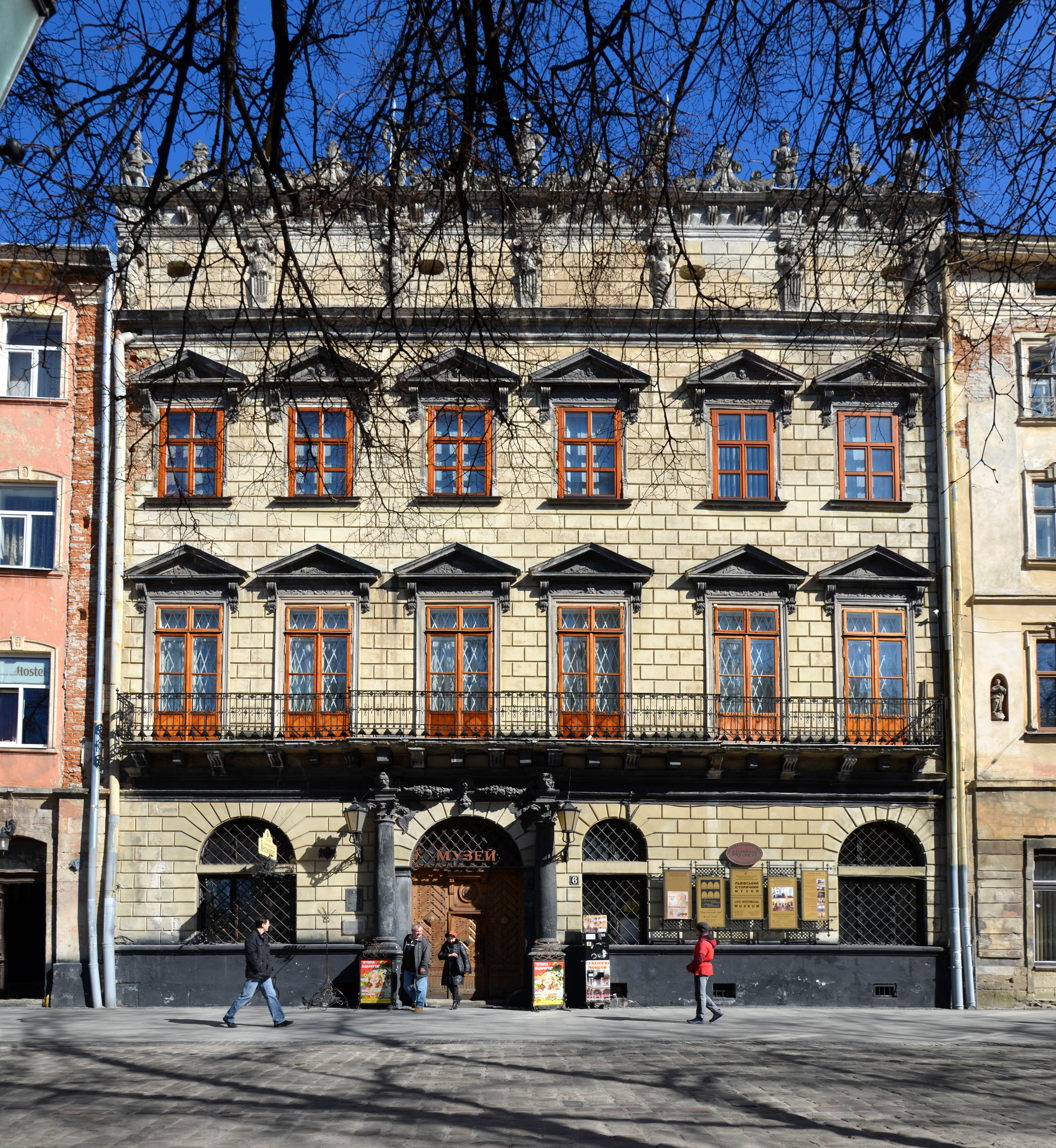
Residence of King John III Sobieski in Lviv

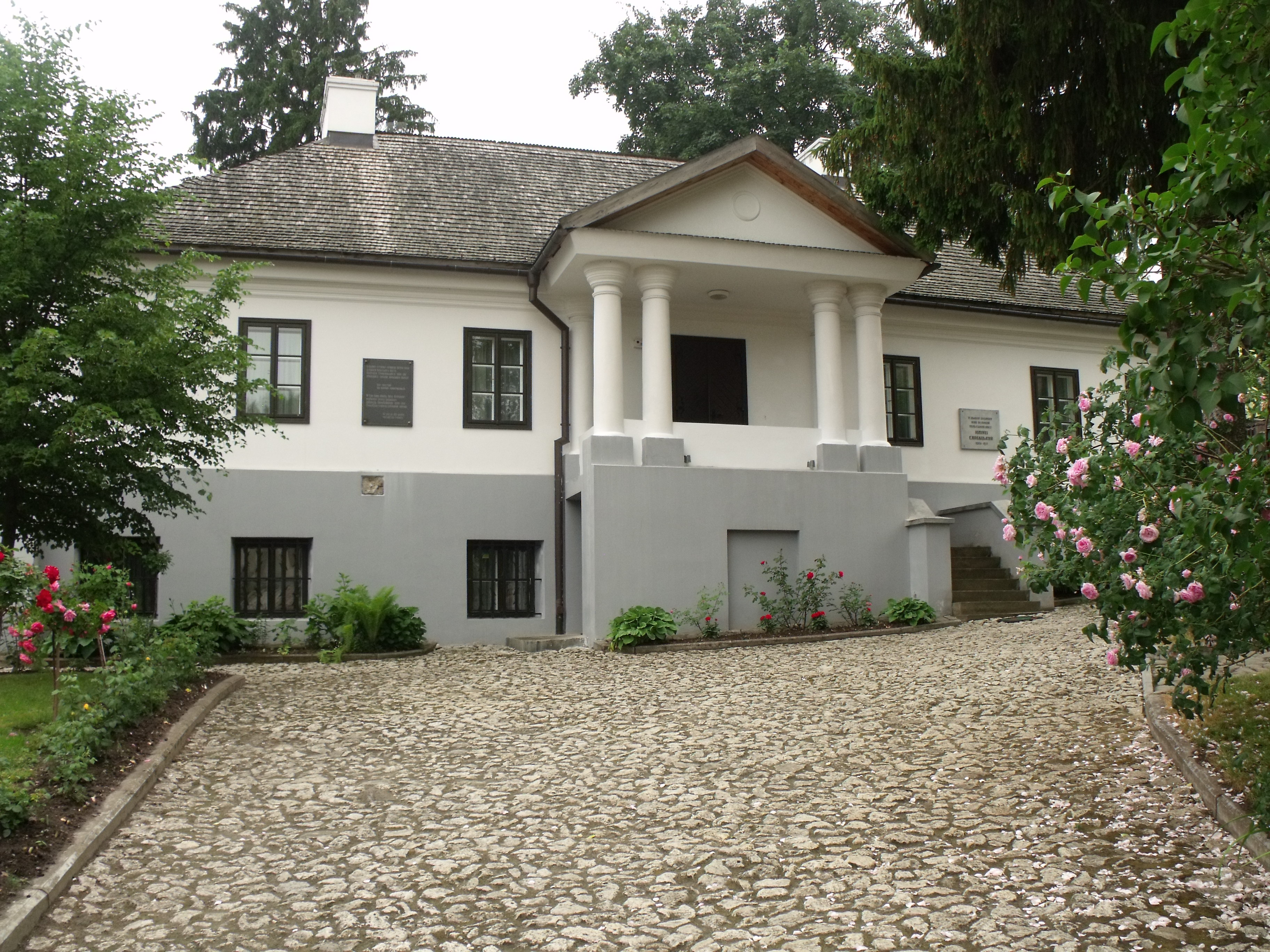
Childhood home of Juliusz Słowacki in Kremenets

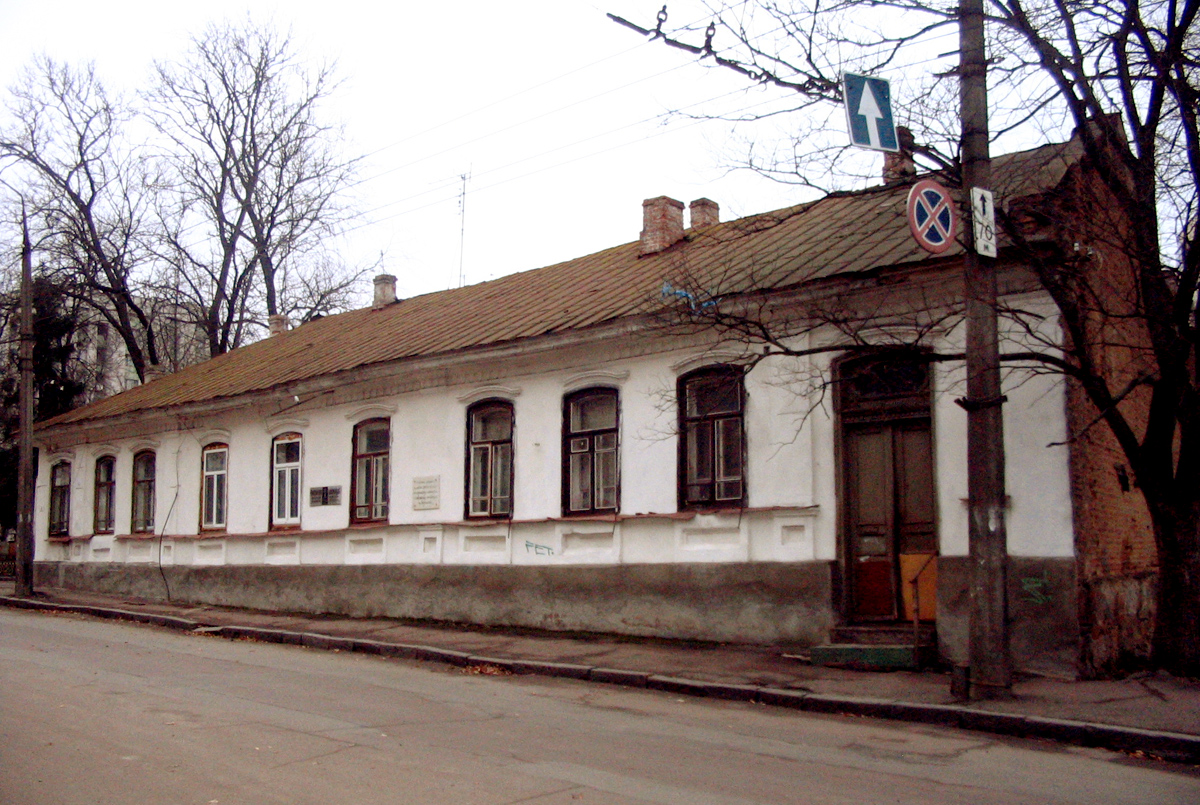
House of Józef Ignacy Kraszewski in Zhytomyr

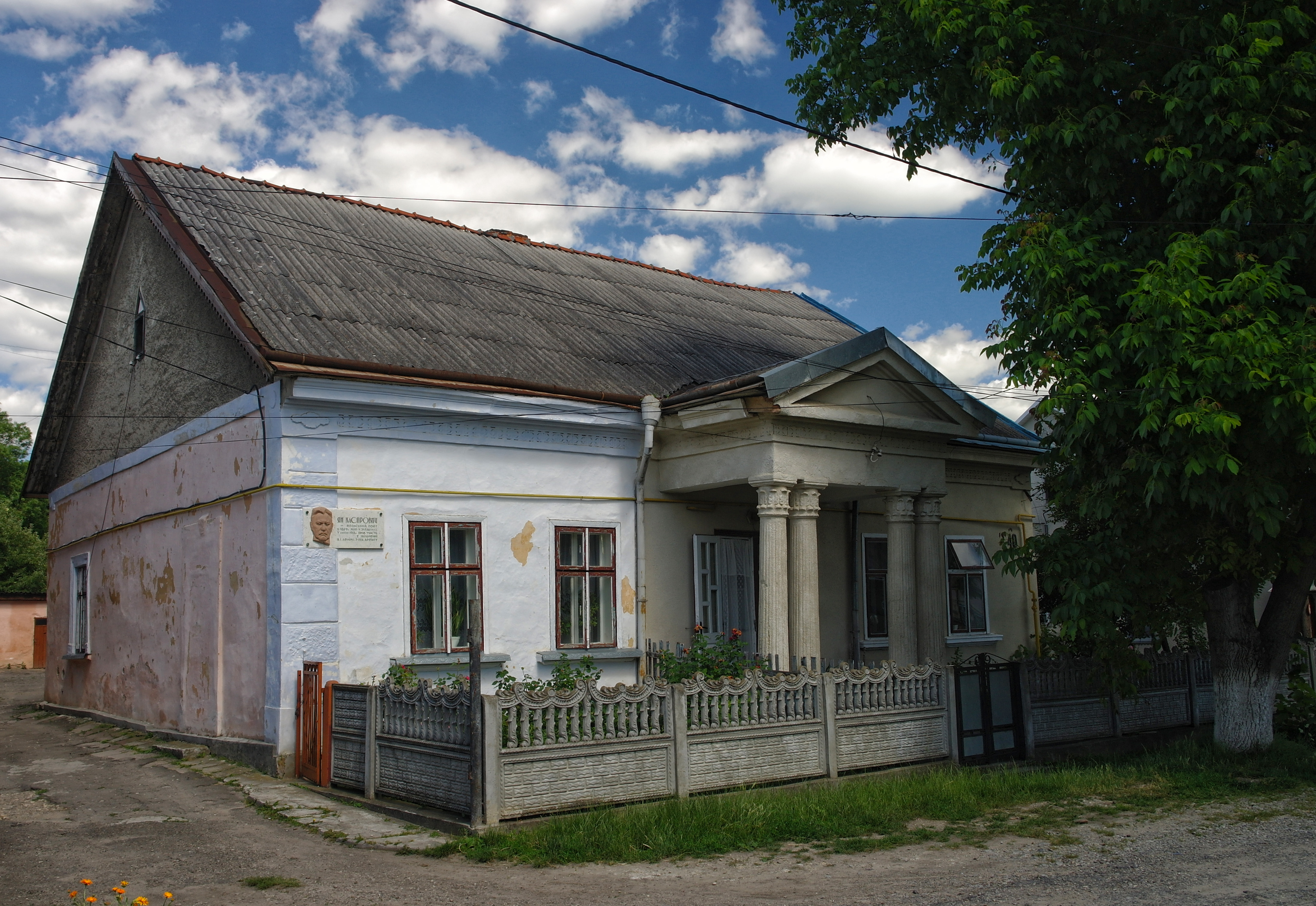
House of Jan Kasprowicz in Zalishchyky

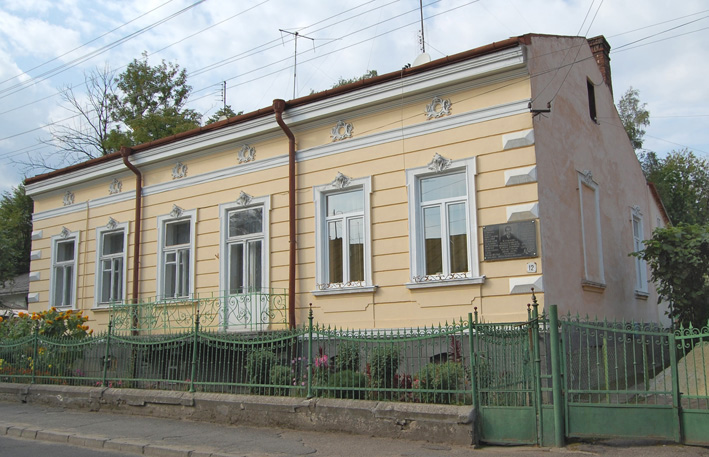
House of Bruno Schulz in Drohobych

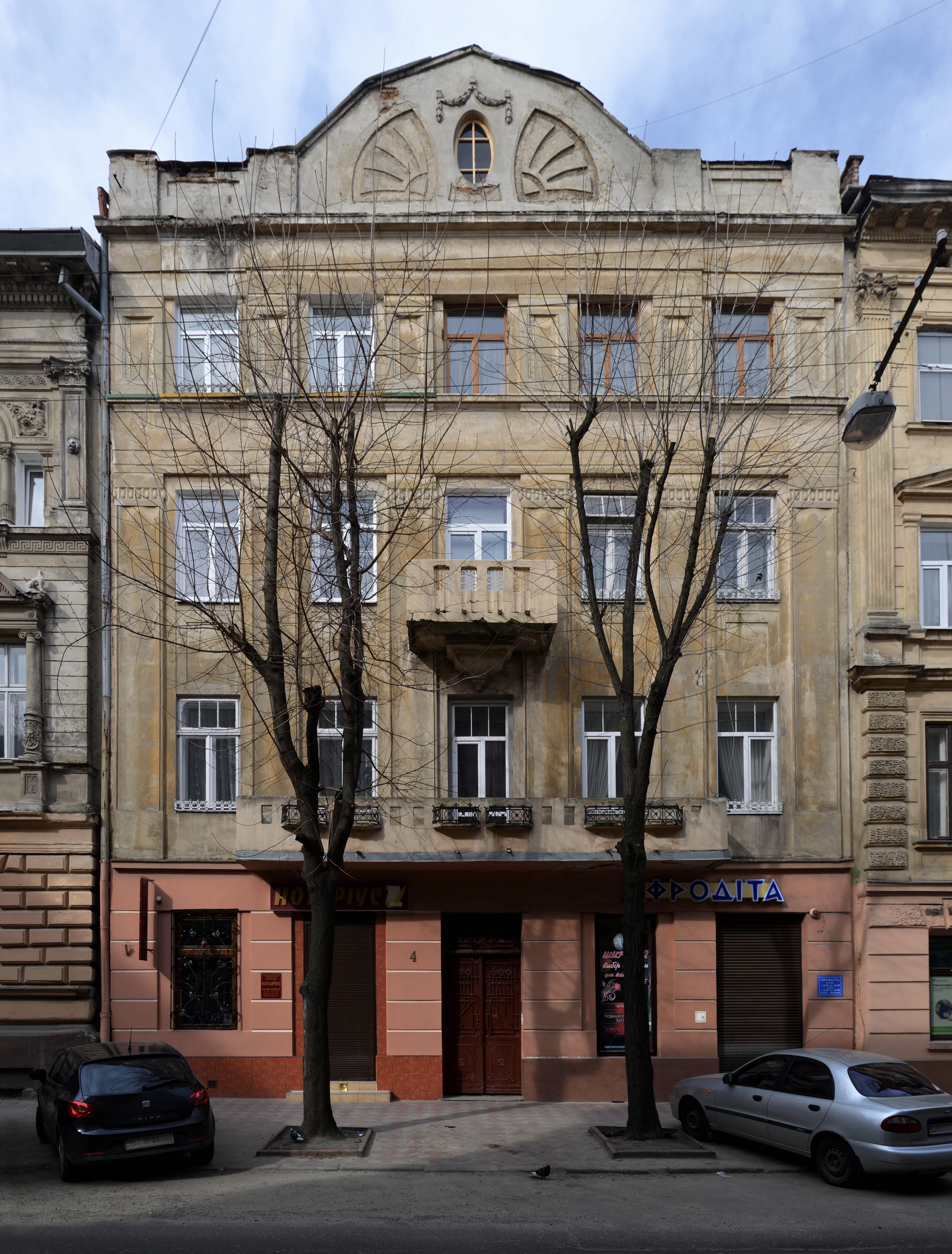
Childhood home of Stanisław Lem in Lviv

== See also ==
- Poland–Ukraine relations
- Ukrainians in Poland
- Polish minority in Soviet Union
- Demographics of Ukraine
- Soviet repressions of Polish citizens (1939–1946)
- Association of the Polish Culture of the Lviv Land
