= Baworowscy Library =

Former library in Lviv, Ukraine

Coordinates: 50.3969°N 24.0364°E

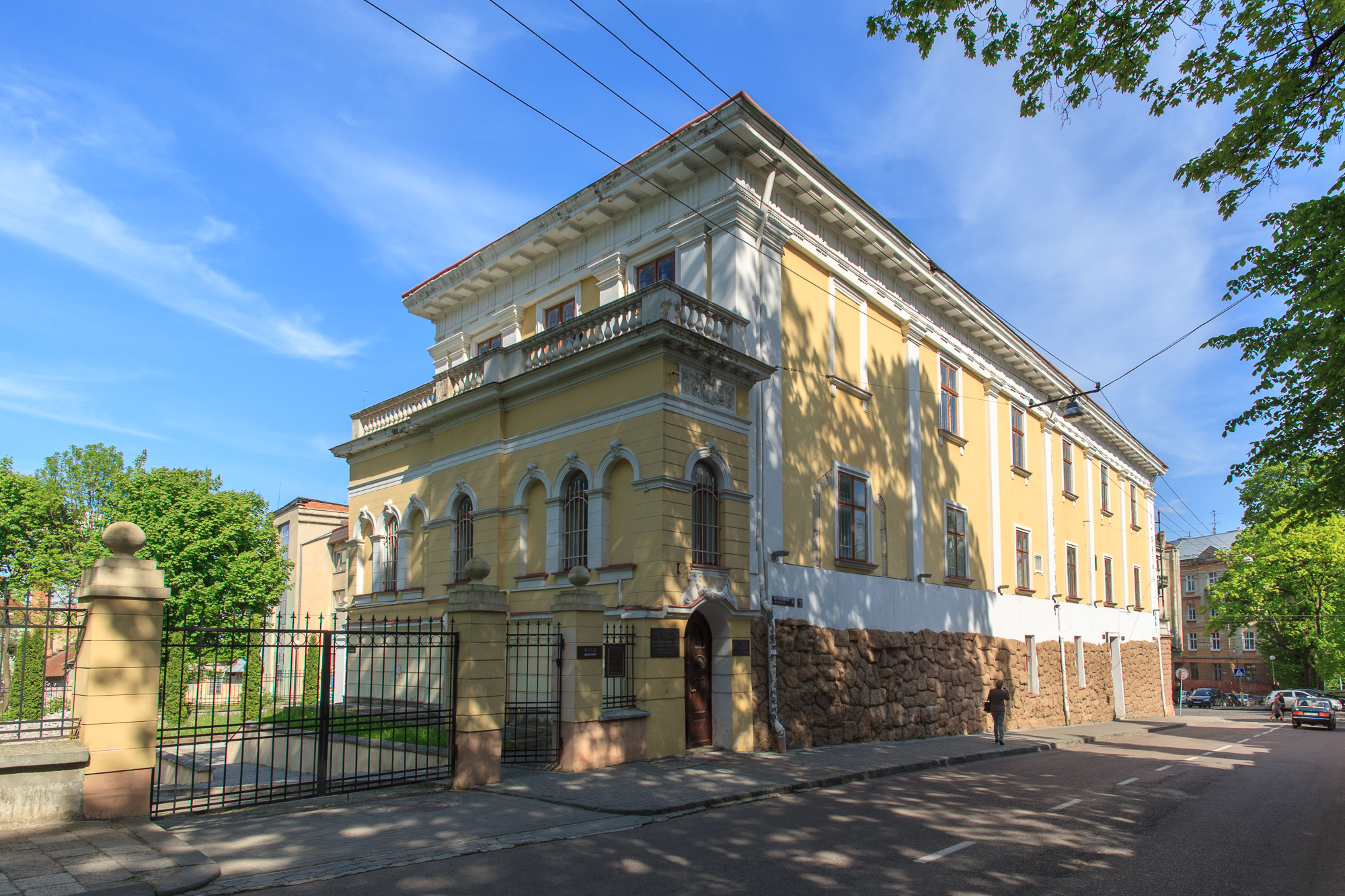
Lviv - The Sieniawski Arsenal - main office of the Library

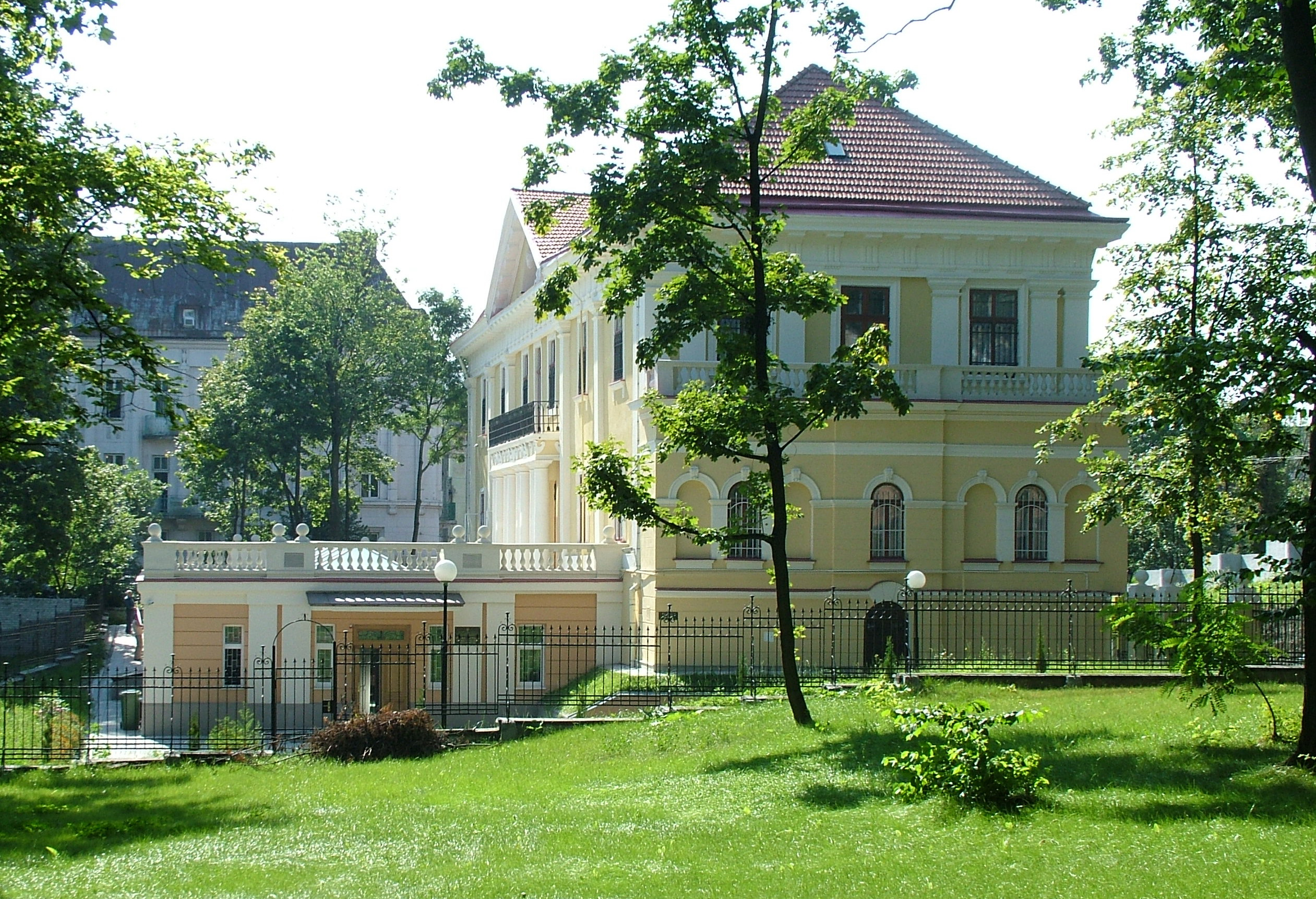
Baworowscy Library

The Baworowscy Library (Polish: Biblioteka Baworowskich) was one of major Polish libraries, with thousands of books and historical documents. It was located in Lwow (now Lviv, Ukraine), and ceased to exist after World War II.

== History ==
The library was founded in the mid-19th century, by count Wiktor Baworowski (1826–1894), who was a great admirer of literature, and translator of works of Lord Byron, and Victor Hugo. Baworowski had a large collection of artworks, and a private library of some 60,000 volumes. He owned his own palace in Lwow, which used to be in former arsenal of the Sieniawski family. The arsenal was built in 1630 by general of artillery Pawel Grodzicki. In the 19th century, it belonged to the Czartoryski family, and later was purchased by the Baworowski family. The new owners redecorated the building, turning it in 1830 into a palace.

The most important part of the library included precious topographical papers, and historic materials in books and manuscripts. In 1944, it had around 38,000 prints, including 30 incunabula, and 1254 manuscripts. There also was the gallery of 285 oil paintings, and 11 000 sketches. The collection included some of the most precious documents of the early history of Poland (Chronicle of Wincenty Kadlubek, and Statutes of Kazimierz Wielki), as well as letters and autographs of Julian Ursyn Niemcewicz, Jan Sniadeck, Aleksander Fredro, and Stanislaw Konarski.

Across the years, the Baworowscy Library was expanded by collections from other libraries. Altogether, 15,000 prints and 10,000 drawings were added, including:

- a collection of 7,000 volumes of count Zygmunt Czarnecki. These were rare papers connected with early Polish history and law, but also religious documents of Dioceses of Kraków and Poznan.
- a collection of some 8,000 volumes of the World War I period, including all prints of the Supreme National Committee

The library also included several pieces of precious furniture from the 17th and 18th centuries, old weaponry, china, clocks, coins, and medals. Art gallery of the library included 300 works of Polish, Dutch, German and Italian painters, such as Mengs, Dolci, Renie, Domenichin, Canaletto, Juliusz Kossak.

After Soviet invasion of eastern Poland, the library was managed by Rudolf Kotula, who on April 13, 1940, together with thousands of Poles, was forcibly taken to Siberia. Kotula was replaced by Stefan Inglot of the Ossolineum. The collection was gradually scattered among Soviet-created institutions. Between 1941 and 1944, under German occupation, the library was reopened under management of professor Mieczysław Gębarowicz, who in early 1944, as the Red Army advanced westwards, transferred some of the works of art to the National Library in Kraków.

== See also ==
- List of libraries in Poland
