= Roman Aftanazy =

Polish historian and author (1914–2004)

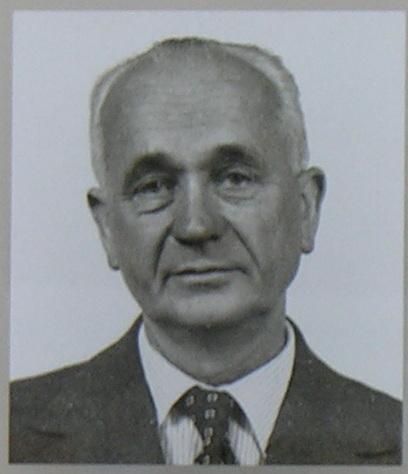
- Born: Włodzimierz Roman Aftanaziw; 2 April 1914; Morszyn, Lwów Oblast, Ukraine
- Died: 7 June 2004 (aged 90); Wrocław, Poland
- Resting place: Powązki Cemetery, Warsaw, Poland
- Citizenship: Polish
- Education: Jan Kazimierz University, Lwów
- Known for: Dzieje rezydencji na dawnych kresach Rzeczypospolitej, History of Residences in Poland's Former Eastern Borderlands
- Awards: Order of Merit of the Republic of Poland, Order of Polonia Restituta
- Scientific career
- Fields: Polish history, Polish architecture, art history
- Workplaces: University of Wrocław, Ossolineum

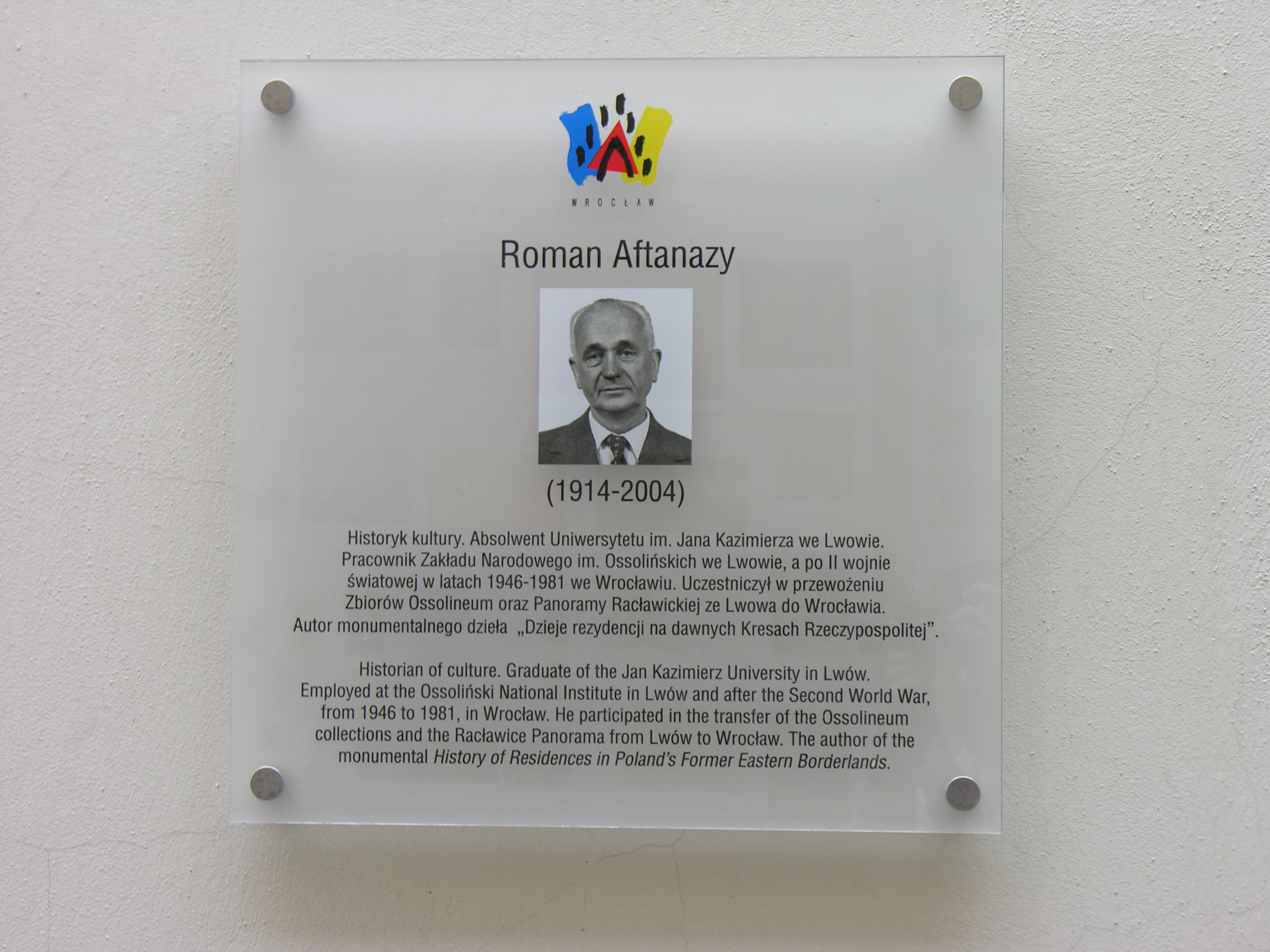
Memorial plaque to Roman Aftanazy

Włodzimierz Roman Aftanaziw, known as Roman Aftanazy (2 April 1914 – 7 June 2004) was a Polish historian, librarian and writer. He is the author of a monumental work of reference, Dzieje rezydencji na dawnych kresach Rzeczypospolitej - History of Residences in Poland's Former Eastern Borderlands, (1991–1997), listing and describing the cultural heritage contained in the myriad estates and grand residences in the once Polish Kresy and Inflanty regions.

== Biography ==
Roman Aftanazy was born on 2 April 1914 in Morszyn, Lwów Oblast, into the family of Jan, a railway official and his wife Olimpia, née Kraśnik. Initially the family name was Aftanaziw. Having completed his primary education in the town of Morszyn, in what is now the Lviv Oblast of today's Ukraine, he attended the Marshal Jozef Pilsudski state secondary school in Stryj which he left in 1935. That year he went on to the Jan Kazimierz University in Lwów, to study history. His formal studies were interrupted by the Outbreak of World War II. Nevertheless, he continued a programme of covert studies under the auspices of the underground University of Lwow and completed his degree in 1942. His master's degree in history was not formally granted until 1946 by the Humanities Faculty of the University of Wrocław, for a thesis, entitled Schooling in Congress Poland 1807–1815, which he had written before the war under the supervision of Stanisław Łempicki.

From January 1940 he was initially employed as a manual worker in the administration of Morszyn Spa, but later assumed an office role. From April 1944 he worked in the library of the National Ossolineum Institute in Lwów, initially as a volunteer, and from August that year as a full-time librarian. In spring 1944, he participated in the transfer of the collections to the crypt of the Dominican Church in Lwów as a safeguarding measure against enemy bombardment.

In January 1945 he was arrested as part of the ethnic purging action against the Polish population of Lwów, on the charge of Anti-Soviet agitation and detained in the Łącki Street prison in Lwów. He was released after intensive interrogations in May and was able to return to his post in the library. On his return he took part in the selection of items that were to be transported to German-occupied Western Poland. He assisted Mieczysław Gębarowicz and the Dominican Fathers in the covert preparation of a rescue transport to Poland of uncatalogued collections of the Ossolineum.

In April 1946 he left Lwów as part of the Population exchange between Poland and Soviet Ukraine and settled in Wrocław. There, from June 1946, he was employed in the University Library. In July 1946 he was a member of the delegation that went to receive in Przemyśl those items of the Ossolineum collections that were "granted" to Poland, as well as collections from certain other museums in Lwów and Kiev. He went on a similar mission in March 1947. In May 1948 he passed an examination that gave him access to the first rank of the Polish state library service, and awarded him employment from June 1948 in the now transferred Ossolineum Institute and its ZNiO library in Wrocław, while formally still on the roll of the University Library till October of that year.

In January 1949 he was appointed curator of the ZNiO library. From April 1949 he managed the acquisitions and completion of collections, a post he retained until November 1981. He achieved his personal aim by the mid-1970s, in so far as gathering all the most important materials and publications extant in 1939. This attainment put the standing of the Ossolineum Library on a par with the collections of the Polish National Library, Biblioteka Narodowa and that of the Jagiellonian Library, Biblioteka Jagiellońska.

In 1982 he was honoured with a Festschrift entitled, Włodzimierz Roman Aftanazy w Bibliotece Ossolineum. Until the end of 1987 he continued to work full-time in the Department of Acquisitions. Roman Aftanazy had no issue and never married.

He died on 7 June 2004 in Wrocław. He was buried in the Powązki Cemetery in Warsaw.

The collections he gathered are now kept in the "Manuscript and Graphics Cabinet" of the ZNiO Library in Wrocław.

== Research and writing ==
=== A chance meeting ===
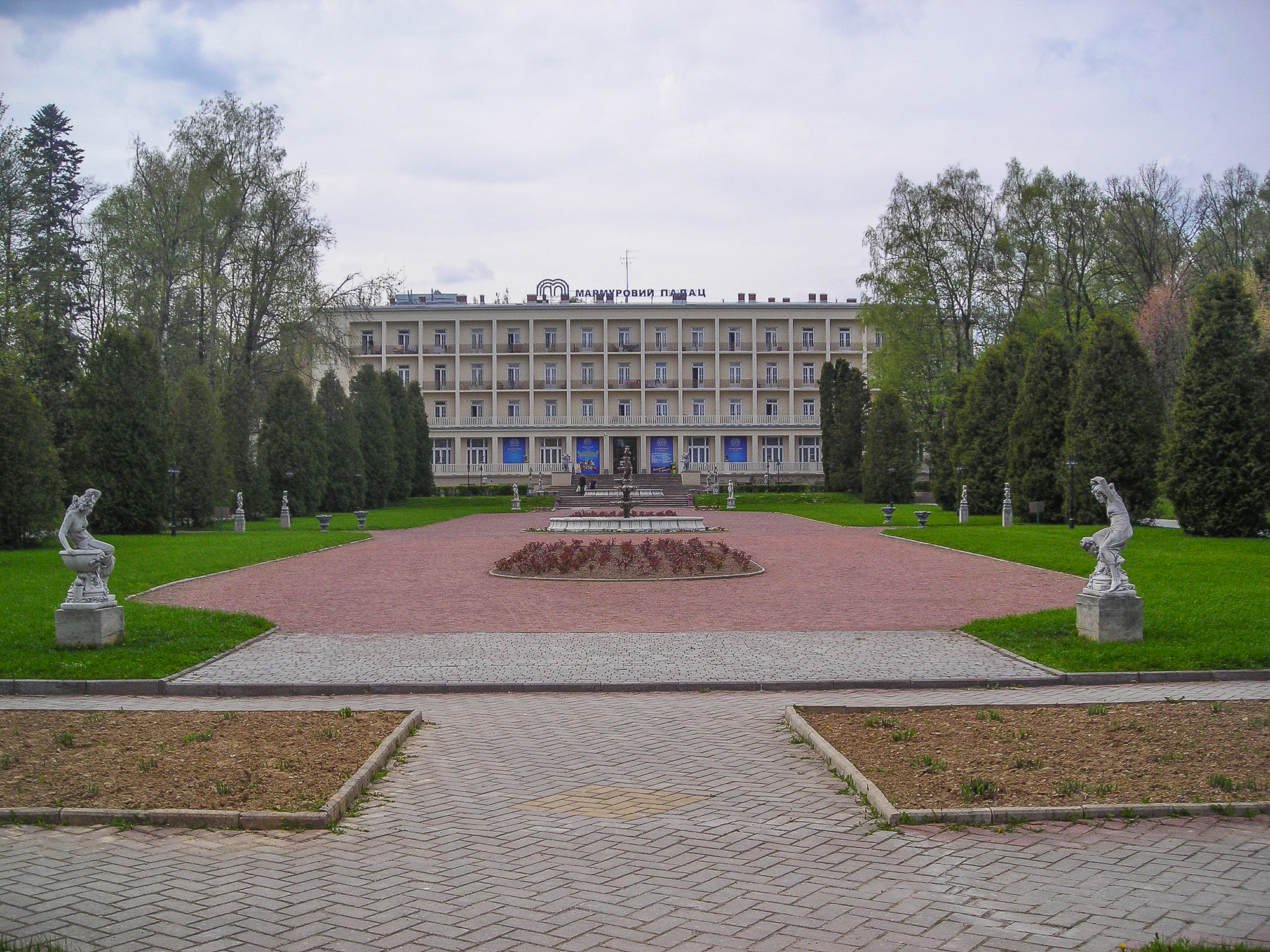
Marble Palace at Morszyn Spa

But for the chance meeting of two women at the Morszyn Spa gardens, in the early 1930s, Roman Aftanazy's illustrious career might have turned out differently. One woman was Aftanazy's mother; the other, Jadwiga Smolka, daughter of historian Prof. Jan Smolka and sister of Maria Smolka, who had married into the Orda family and owned the Nowoszyce estate in Polesie Province in Podolia. Jadwiga Smolka asked the teenage Aftanazy's mother whether her son might be interested in seeing a still functioning traditional estate and its grand residence, mentioned by writers such as Maria Rodziewiczówna and Józef Weyssenhoff. Aftanazy was invited there for a holiday and came back dazzled by the experience.

=== Scholarship ===
Aftanazy dedicated his entire adult life to gathering material for his academic study of Polish estates and palaces owned by the Polish szlachta, that is, the nobility in the Eastern Kresy region of the Republic of Two Nations. During the interwar period he focused on a description of Polish grand houses as they had been within the frontiers of the state as of 1772. He would travel from one estate to the next, taking photographs and collecting information. Up to and including 1939, he had taken pictures of around 70 sites.

Using the pen name, Ksawery Niedobitowski, he published well over a dozen articles in several popular magazines, including: Ilustrowany Kurier Codzienny, Światowid and the weekly As. After World War II he broadened his interest to the entire former territory of the Kingdom of Poland and the Grand Duchy of Lithuania. At first he considered his outings as a hobby, but this was soon supplanted by the idea of publishing a Monographic series. With a systematic survey in mind, he designed a questionnaire that he would send out to former Polish landed families throughout the world.

By the late 1950s he had completed studies on the castles, courts and palaces of Wolyn and Podolia. However, in 1957 all he was able to publish in the Annals of the National Ossolinski Institute was an article, whose title translates as, The architect Merk and his works. An essay on the history of Classical architecture in Poland, encompassing just two chapters on Wolynian estates. The reason for the restriction on further publication of the available material was censorship formalities by the Polish state. Aftanazy continued his mission in his spare time financing the project from his personal means.

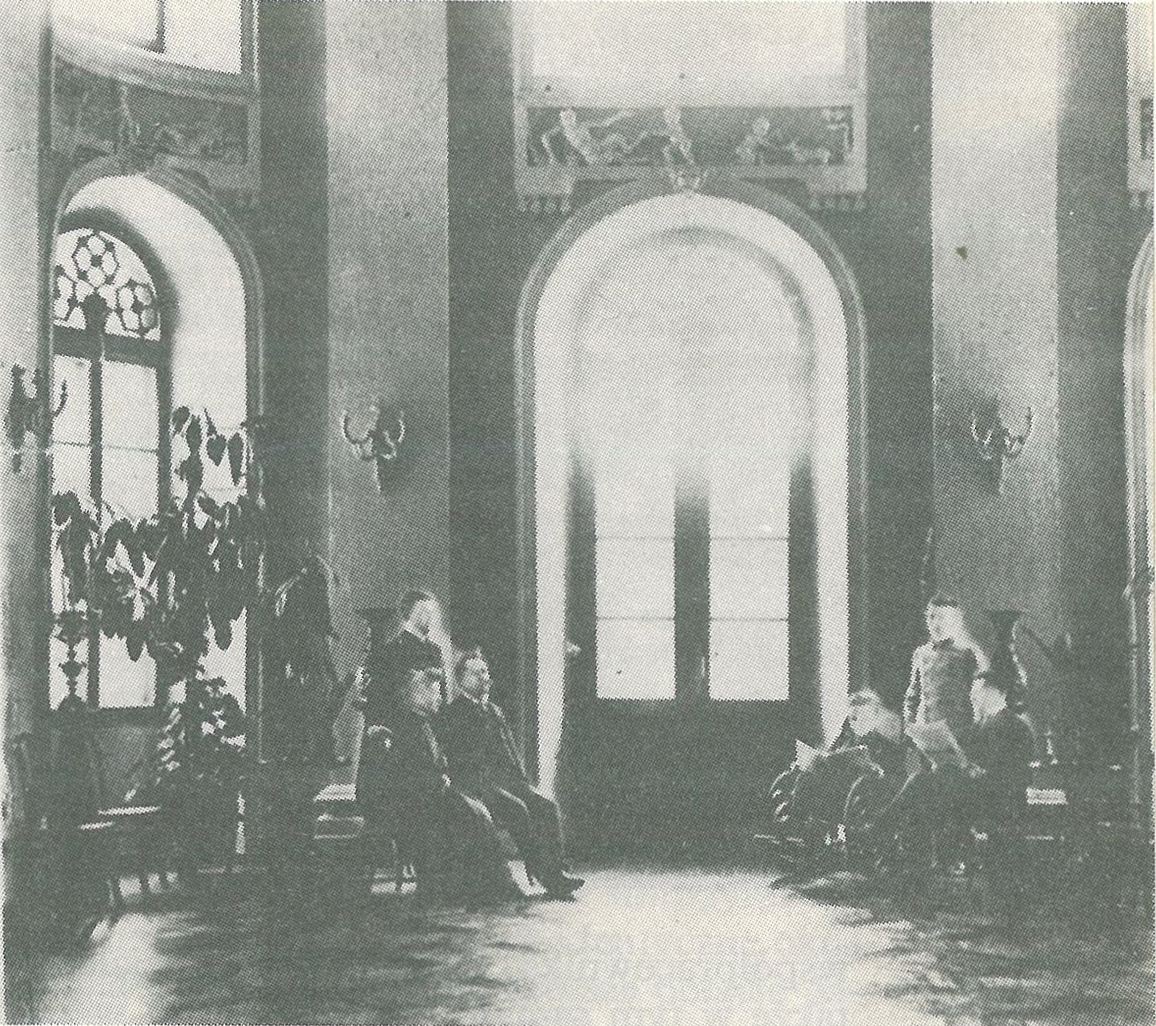
Illustration from Aftanazy's "History", Siomkaŭ Sałamiarecki, Chmara, c. 1914

Gradually Aftanazy's activities became known among Polish art historians. The initiative to publish his monumental work was taken by Tadeusz Chrzanowski, followed in 1984 by Stanislaw Mossakowski, the then director of the Arts Institute of the Polish Academy of Arts and Sciences (PAN), who took the decision to issue a printed version of the collected material. From 1986 onwards a series using the polygraphic method of printing technique began to be issued under the PAN imprint. Each print run was limited to 500 copies, under the title Materials for the History of Residences, purposely avoiding to mention the territorial aspect of the series. Its editor was Andrzej Baranowski. The project was funded with financial aid from the Polish art historian and philanthropist exiled in London, Andrzej Ciechanowiecki.

After the Fall of communism in Poland the print run was raised to 1,000 copies and began to appear in 1993. The series now consisted of 11 volumes with 22 supplements. Between 1991 and 1997 a second amended edition with additions was issued by the ZNiO publishing house, under the new title, History of Residences in Poland's Former Eastern Borderlands.

== Publications ==
- Biographies of Emanuel Małyński and Wacław Mańkowski in the Polish Biographical Dictionary (1974)
- Materiały do dziejów rezydencji. published by Instytut Sztuki PAN, 1986-1994 (11 volumes in 22 bound copies)
- Dzieje rezydencji na dawnych kresach Rzeczypospolitej. Wydawnictwo Ossolineum, Wrocław 1991-1997

=== Titles of the eleven volumes of the History ===
- Vol. 1. Województwa: mińskie, mścisławskie, połockie, witebskie
- Vol. 2. Województwa: brzesko-litewskie, nowogródzkie
- Vol. 3. Województwo trockie, Księstwo Żmudzkie, Inflanty Polskie, Księstwo Kurlandzkie
- Vol. 4. Województwo wileńskie
- Vol. 5. Województwo wołyńskie
- Vol. 6. Województwo bełskie. Ziemia Chełmska województwa ruskiego
- Vol. 7. Województwo ruskie. Ziemia Halicka i Lwowska
- Vol. 8. Województwo ruskie. Ziemia Przemyska i Sanocka
- Vol. 9. Województwo podolskie
- Vol. 10. Województwo bracławskie
- Vol. 11. Województwo kijowskie oraz uzupełnienia do tomów 1-10

== Prizes and honours ==
- Honorary membership of the Polish Association of Conservators (1987)
- Lower Silesia Prize (1987)
- Prize awarded by the Minister of Culture and the Arts and by the Association of Conservators (1990)
- Academic Prize from the Polish Academy of Learning (1990)
- Prize from Polish Association of Science Abroad, London (1990)
- The Jerzy Łojka Foundation Prize from the Jozef Pilsudski Institute in America, New York (1993)
- Wrocław City Council Prize (1993)
- Gold Medal to the Custodian of Places of National Memory from the Council for the Protection of the Memory of Battles and Martyrdom (1993)
- The Włodzimierz Pietrzak Prize (1994)
- Prize from the Foundation for Polish Education (1994)
- Władysław and Nelli Turzański Foundation Prize (1995)
- The „Przegląd Wschodni” (Eastern Review) Prize (1995)
- Honorary membership of the Polish Landowners Association (1998)
- Honorary Doctorate from the Independent Bielorussian College in Minsk (2000)
- Posthumous Guardian of National Memory Prize (2014)

== Awards ==
- Gold Cross of Merit (1956)
- Knight's Cross of the Order of Polonia Restituta (Krzyż Kawalerski Orderu Odrodzenia Polski)
- Commander's Cross (3rd class) (12 December 1994, decree by President Lech Wałęsa, citation: In honour of outstanding service to the Nation's culture

== Bibliography ==
- Andrzej Kwilecki (2007). Silva rerum. Ludzie – instytucje – wydarzenia. Zapiski i wspomnienia. Poznań: Wydawnictwo Poznańskie. ISBN 9788371774669.
- Juzwenko, Adolf. Ed. (2016). Kustosz i Samotnik. Tom poświęcony pamięci Romana Aftanazego. Wrocław: Seria Osso Wczoraj i Dziś. ISBN 978-83-65588-06-7.
- Słownik geograficzny Królestwa Polskiego Geographical Dictionary of the Kingdom of Poland (in Polish)
