= Ossolineum =

Polish cultural foundation, publishing house, archival institute and research centre

National Ossoliński Institute
- Zakład Narodowy im. Ossolińskich
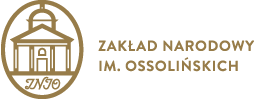

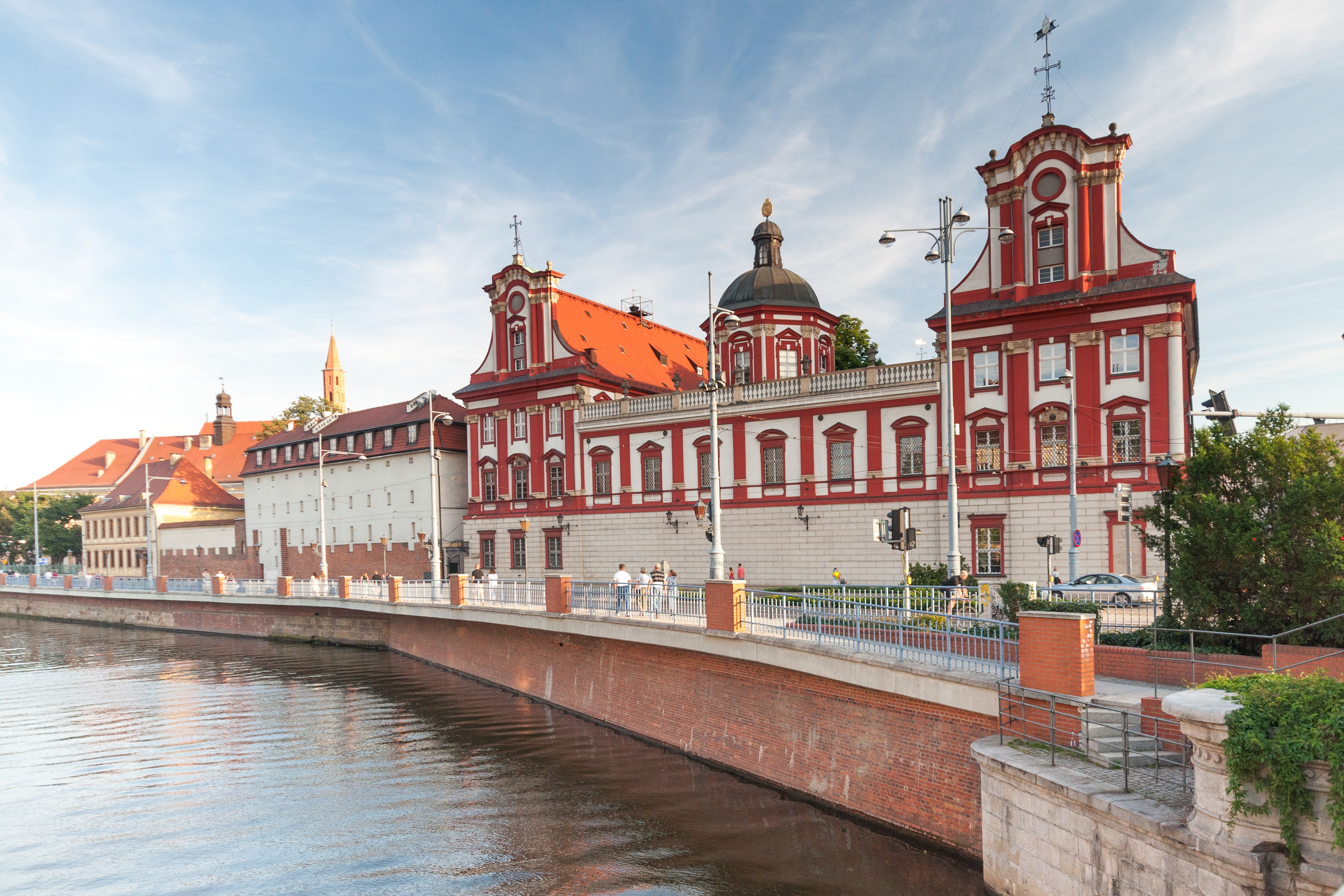
- Main building of the Ossolineum, Wrocław
- Location: Wrocław, Poland
- Type: National library, publishing house
- Established: 12 June 1817; 209 years ago

Collection
- Size: 1,800,000 (As of 2015)

Other information
- Director: Phd Łukasz Kamiński
- Website: ossolineum.pl

Ossoliński National Institute (Polish: Zakład Narodowy im. Ossolińskich, ZNiO), more commonly known as the Ossolineum, is a Polish cultural foundation, publishing house, archival institute and a research centre of national significance founded in 1817 in Lwów (now Lviv). Located in the city of Wrocław since 1947, it is the second largest institution of its kind in Poland after the ancient Jagiellonian Library in Kraków. Its publishing arm is the oldest continuous imprint in Polish since the early 19th century. It bears the name of its founder, Polish nobleman, Count Józef Maksymilian Ossoliński (1748-1826).

Although its origin may be traced to the foreign imposed partitions of the Polish–Lithuanian Commonwealth in the 18th century, the institute's actual history dates from 1817 in the former Polish city of Lwów, then known as Lemberg, capital of Galicia, a province of Austrian Empire (now Lviv in western Ukraine). The institute first opened its doors to the public in 1817. Ossoliński's purpose was not only to establish a library with archival and other historical materials and a printing works as a basis for the most important Polish national cultural institution at a time when sovereign Poland did not exist, but also to disseminate information to the Polish population through publishing as a means of maintaining cultural ties.

Due to continued existential ordeals provoked by two world wars and other military and political conflicts, such as the ethnic cleansing of the Polish population of the Eastern Borderlands (Kresy) after the annexation of one-third of Poland's landmass in 1939, much of the library and other collections were plundered, scattered or deliberately destroyed. Barely one-third of the artefacts and printed items from the Ossolineum made it to Wrocław after World War II. However those items which survived, did so thanks to the heroic dedication of staff, not least, Mieczysław Gębarowicz.

Since its westerly relocation in 1947 the Ossolineum's Polish department has become the most extensive in the country as it strives to complete a record of the whole Polish scientific and literary oeuvre. It is the repository of manuscripts of some of the foremost Polish scientists, writers and poets, including: Nicolaus Copernicus' De revolutionibus orbium coelestium, Jan Kochanowski, Adam Mickiewicz, Adam Asnyk, Jan Kasprowicz, Władysław Reymont, Stefan Żeromski, Juliusz Słowacki, and in particular Henryk Sienkiewicz, whose chief publisher it has been.

The ZNiO departments are: the Ossolineum Library (1816), the Lubomirski Museum (1823), Ossolineum Publishers (1827), the Pan Tadeusz Museum.

== History ==
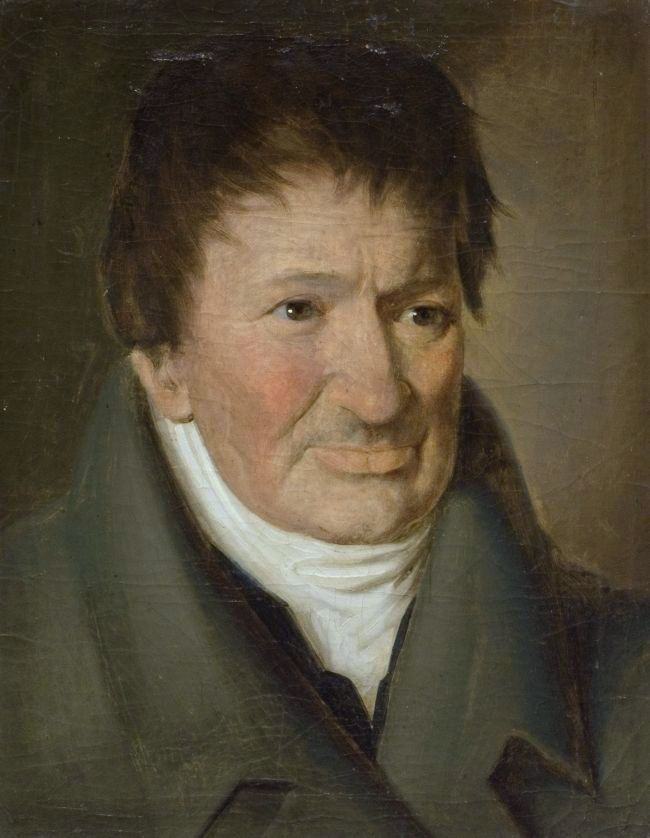
Józef Ossoliński

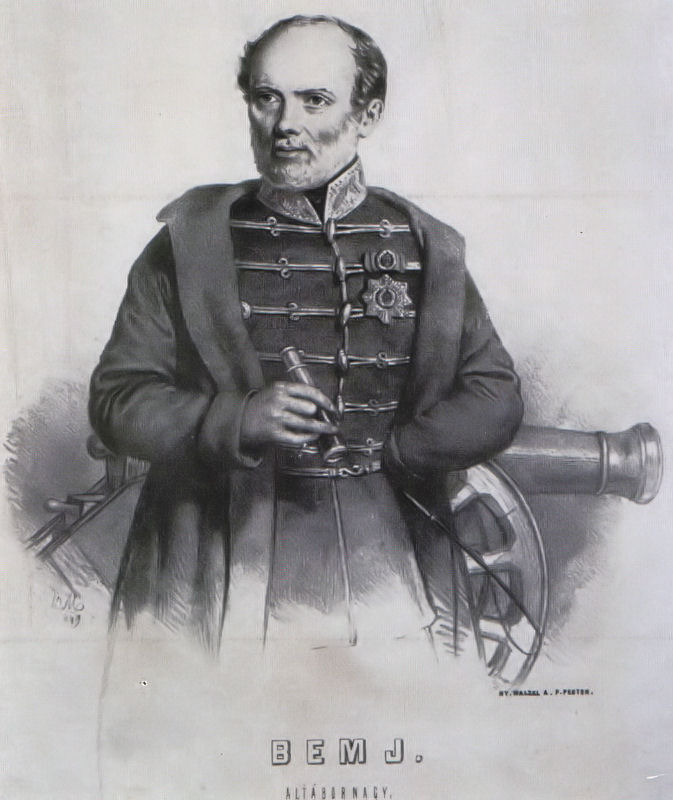
Joseph Bem in 1848

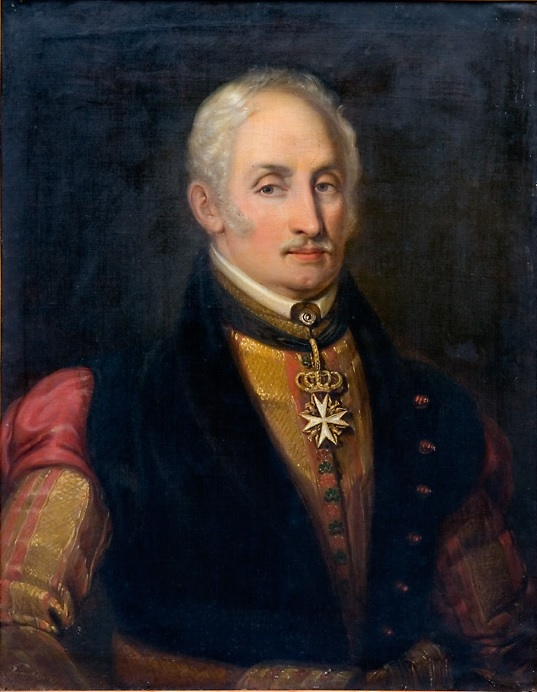
Prince Henryk Lubomirski

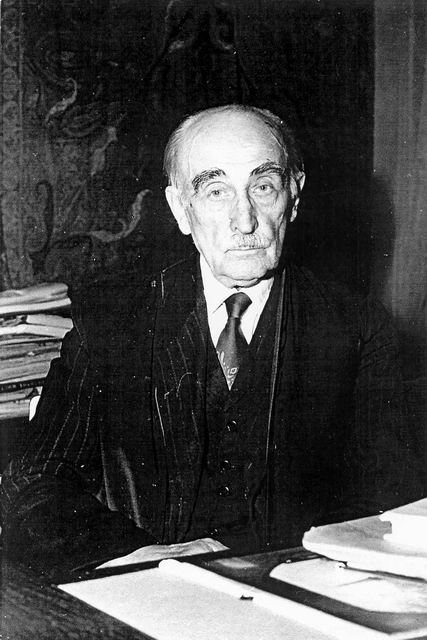
Mieczysław Gębarowicz, the wartime director who outsmarted the invaders

Ossoliński who was a politician, writer and researcher had already devoted his long life to building and cataloguing an extremely rich library collection, consisting of books, manuscripts, prints and coins. It was only upon mature consideration and after observing developments since the Congress of Vienna that he opted for Lwów, as the most suitable place in which to house his 52 crates of materials having obtained prior approval of the Austrian emperor, Francis I. Thus began his Institute in Lwów (Institut in Lemberg in German). The income from Ossoliński's landed properties served for over three decades to finance his acquisitions and collection. The Ossolineum quickly became a celebrated centre for Polish science and culture which not only survived under foreign rule, but throughout the Second Polish Republic in the Interwar period.

Until the 1939 invasion of Poland it had combined a library, publishing house, and the Lubomirski Museum. The National Ossoliński Institute had been located from its foundation until 1945 in the former convent and church buildings of the Carmelite Order of nuns in Lwów at 2, Ossolińscy street, (since renamed vulytsia Stefanyka). After the first partition of Poland and the dissolution of many convents by the Austrian emperor Joseph II, the convent buildings had become a ruin. Their restoration became a project for General Józef Bem who in 1823 merged the Lubomirski Museum (originally founded by Prince Henryk Lubomirski) with the Ossoliński Institute.

Under Austrian rule, the Ossolineum became a beacon for the Polish independence movement and was one of the most important centres of Polish culture despite foreign rule and the Germanization of its structures. During that time there were many persecutions such as police searches and arrests of employees of the institute. It housed a clandestine Polish printing works in the early 1840s, and had exclusive rights for publishing textbooks under the relative Galician autonomy. During the revolutionary upheaval in 1848, the Ossolineum became a Polish landmark in an otherwise highly ethnically diverse city.

=== Collections ===
In accordance with the intentions of its founder, the Ossolineum became one of the most important research centres for history and Polish literature, with one of the largest book collections in Poland as well as a large collection of manuscripts and autographs, including medieval manuscripts and some of the rarest incunabula. There were also individual smaller archives and book collections deposited at the Ossolineum by grand families such as the: Jabłonowski, Piniński, Pawlikowski, Skarbek, Balzer, Sapieha, Lubomirski and Mniszech.

== Wars of Independence after WW I ==
After the Russian Revolution and the collapse of Austria-Hungary, before World War I had even ended, Galicia was the scene of further major more localised armed conflict. The Ossolineum was attacked by Ukrainian soldiers during the fighting over the city in 1918.

Before the Second World War, the Ossolineum library consisted of 220,000 works, over 6,000 manuscripts, over 9,000 autographs, over 2,000 diplomas and over 3,000 maps (the collection of J.M. Ossoliński from the year 1827 included 10,121 works, 19,055 volumes, duplicates, 567 manuscripts in 715 volumes, 133 maps, 1,445 figures). The Ossolineum also kept a complete collection of the published Polish press from the 19th and 20th centuries, the largest in Poland.

In his last will, Józef Ossoliński had named members of his family as curators and directors to ensure the continuity of the institute and nominated 28 notable Polish families from among whom successors could be chosen in the event his own family died out.

== World War II seizures ==
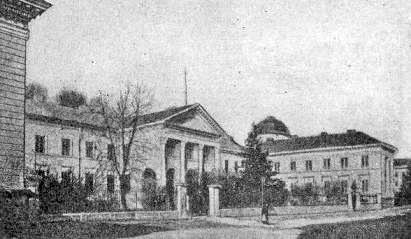
The building of the Ossolineum Institute in Lwów (now Lviv, Ukraine). Archival photograph from before World War II

After the takeover of Lwów by the Soviet Union in the September 1939 attack on Poland, the Communist Party nationalized and redistributed all private property. The Ossolineum was closed and its library holdings were absorbed in the newly created Lviv Branch of the Academy of Sciences of the Ukrainian SSR. The Lubomirski Museum collection was distributed among various Lwów museums managed by the Ukrainians for the next two years. During the subsequent German occupation of Lwów, from 29 June 1941 to 27 July 1944, the Ossolineum library was incorporated into the structure of the new German Staatsbibilothek Lemberg. At the beginning of 1944, the German government decided to move not only the collection of Staatsbibilothek Lemberg (Lwów's library), but also the university and polytechnic libraries and the Shevchenko Scientific Society collection.

Following German orders, two archival consignments were prepared by professor Mieczysław Gębarowicz, the Ossolineum's manager during part of the war, and were supposed to include only specifically German literature and a reference book collection from the main reading room. However, in the event it also contained the most valuable and carefully selected special collections of the Ossolineum's cimelia. Gębarowicz sent instructions by covert letters to his colleagues in Kraków. Altogether there were 2,300 manuscripts, ca. 2,200 documents, ca. 1,700 old prints, ca. 2,400 figures and drawings from an old collection in the Lubomirski Museum, the Pawlikowski collection and hundreds of old coins. Moreover, it also included c. 170 of the most valuable manuscripts of another Polish foundation library the Baworowscy Library, and the most valuable manuscripts and incunabula of the University Library in Lwów. Among the evacuated literature of the 19th and 20th centuries there were the autographs of Pan Tadeusz by Adam Mickiewicz, the entire literary legacy of Juliusz Słowacki: his manuscripts with autographs of Mazepa, Lilla Weneda, Król-Duch, and Aleksander Fredro, with autographs of Pan Jowialski, Śluby panieńskie, Zemsta and Dożywocie, and the autographs of works by Seweryn Goszczyński, Teofil Lenartowicz, Józef Conrad, Henryk Sienkiewicz, including autographs of The Deluge, Józef Ignacy Kraszewski, Jan Kasprowicz, Władysław Reymont, including the autograph of Chłopi, and the papers of Stefan Żeromski.

The manuscript collection of Lwów's own scholars was included in the move: Wojciech Kętrzyński, Ludwik Bernacki, Oswald Balzer, Karol Szajnocha along with the archive of the Galician activist peasant movement of Bolesław and Maria Wysłouch. In terms of documents, the oldest and most valuable items were selected, including the documents of Pope Gregory IX from 1227 and the Silesian prince, Henry I the Bearded from 1229.

The Ossolineum cargo reached German occupied Kraków during March and April 1944, with the intention of safe storage in a cellar of the Jagiellonian Library during the expected military actions. However, in the summer of 1944, the consignment was transferred by the Germans further West and stored in Adelin (Zgrodno) near Złotoryja in Lower Silesia. Fortunately, it survived the whole war and in 1947 was able to be incorporated in the collection of the relocated Ossolineum Library in Wrocław.

After the subsequent reversal of military fortunes and a second seizure of the city of Lwów by the Soviet army, till then under German occupation, from August 1944 the library holdings became part of the so-called Polish Sector of the Lviv Institute of Sciences' library. Only a small part of the library and archival material was transported from Lviv to Wrocław during 1946–1947 as a "gift from the Ukrainian people to the Polish nation". It arrived in two train consignments in sealed carriages in Wrocław, which was still in ruins at the time, and was opened to readers in September 1947.

== Postwar appropriation and destruction ==
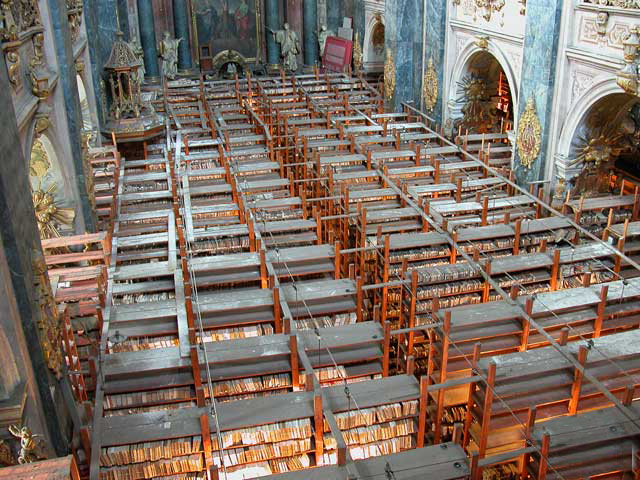
The former Saints Peter and Paul Jesuit Church in Lviv, where the Polish press collection was kept for 50 years before being destroyed rather than transferred to Poland

In 1946–1947, the Ukrainian authorities divided the Ossolineum collection into two parts. They followed the general rule that all materials referring to or with origins in lands east of the Curzon line, especially those connected with (in the Ukrainian commission's opinion) the history and culture of West Ukraine, and those connected in any way with Russia, Belarus, Podolia, Volhynia (Wołyń), Lithuania, Turkey were to remain in Lviv. This rule applied even to those materials in which there was only a single reference to West Ukraine. As an example, a large carton of papers pertaining to Greater Poland and Silesian could not be released to Poland since it contained a single page referring to Zhovkva (Żółkiew). The same happened to foreign materials which, in the Ukrainian commission's opinion, were not connected to Poland.

Originally, the Ukrainians planned to hand over just 30,000 volumes from the Ossolineum Library. This number was reviewed several times so that in May 1946 it had finally reached 150,000 items including books, prints from the 19th and 20th centuries and manuscripts. It constituted only 15–20% of the entire collection because the graphical and cartographical collections, and almost the entire collection of Polish periodicals from the 19th and 20th centuries were not taken into consideration.

Polish staff was not allowed to participate in the decision-making and were assigned solely to technical tasks, whereas management decisions and therefore ultimate control were the preserve solely of Ukrainian staff. The premises where materials were being packed were closed off, and Polish staff were denied access to them. The whole operation was conducted in a great hurry.

While dividing the collections, apparently arbitrary criteria were applied. Among the deeply questionable decisions to withhold documents were:

- King Stanisław August Poniatowski's Act of abdication, as it was signed in Grodno (now Hrodna in Belarus)
- Materials from John Amos Comenius' exile in Leszno, since he was not a Pole but a Bohemian
- All materials concerning dissidents
- Materials pertaining to the Bar Confederation
- Diplomatic correspondence concerning the Partitions of Poland

In Lviv stayed a priceless collection of the Polish press, which lay unprotected and "temporarily" stored for 50 years in the Jesuit Saints Peter and Paul Church. This collection was subsequently deliberately destroyed as a part of the Soviet tendency to eradicate any evidence of Polish heritage and its 600-year role in the history of Lviv.

The National Ossoliński Institute in Lviv was renamed W. Stefanyk Lviv's National Scientific Library of Ukraine.

== Partial transfer to Wrocław ==
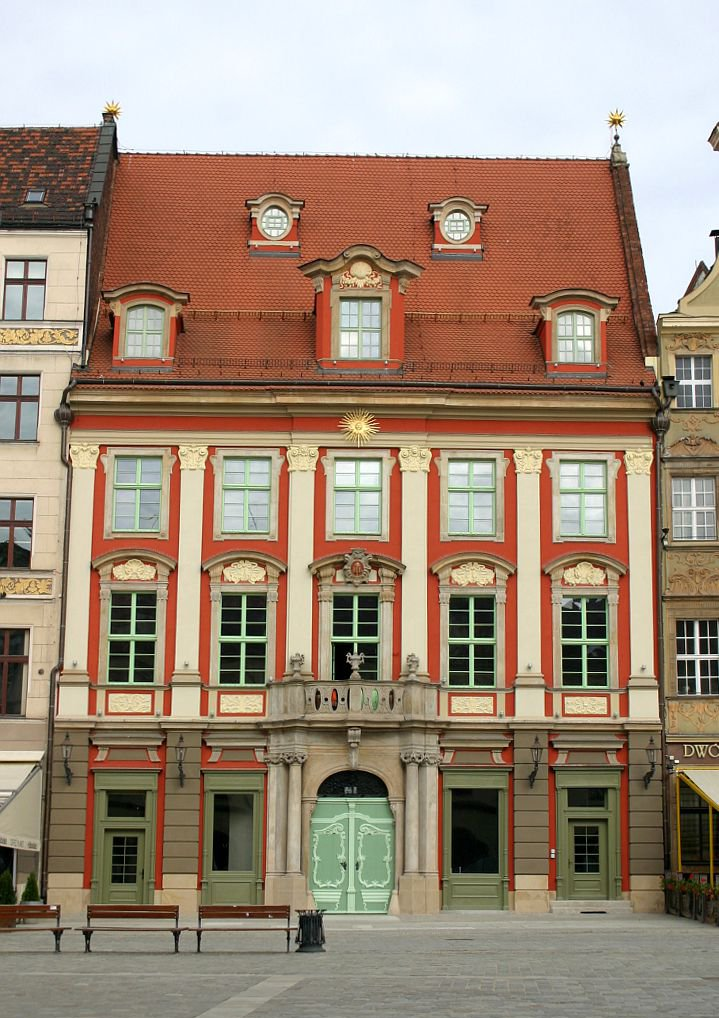
"The House under the Golden Sun" in Market Square, home of the Pan Tadeusz manuscript

Since 1947, the Ossolineum Library in Wrocław has been reassembled from the original collections in the Lwów Ossolineum, which Poland had only partially recovered from the Soviet authorities. It is estimated that about a third of the entire Interwar period collection found its way to Wrocław. The Wrocław city authorities allocated a former German secondary Catholic boys school, which had ceased to function in 1945, as the main building for the Ossolineum in the old St. Matthew's Academy at 37, Szewska street. Two further buildings were later provided, one at 24, Sołtysowicka Street and the other a Museum and exhibition space at "Kamienica pod Złotym Słońcem" at 6, Rynek ('The House under the Golden Sun' at no. 6, in the Market Square).

After the "Agrarian reform Act" 1945 in Poland which abolished landed estates, the main source of finance for the institute's maintenance dried up so the Budget took over responsibility in the new order of the Polish People's Republic. Since 1953, when the Polish Academy of Sciences (PAN) came into being, the Ossolineum Library and publishing house became integrated with the academy institutions as two distinct operations. It functioned within PAN until mid 1990s.

== The Ossolineum today ==
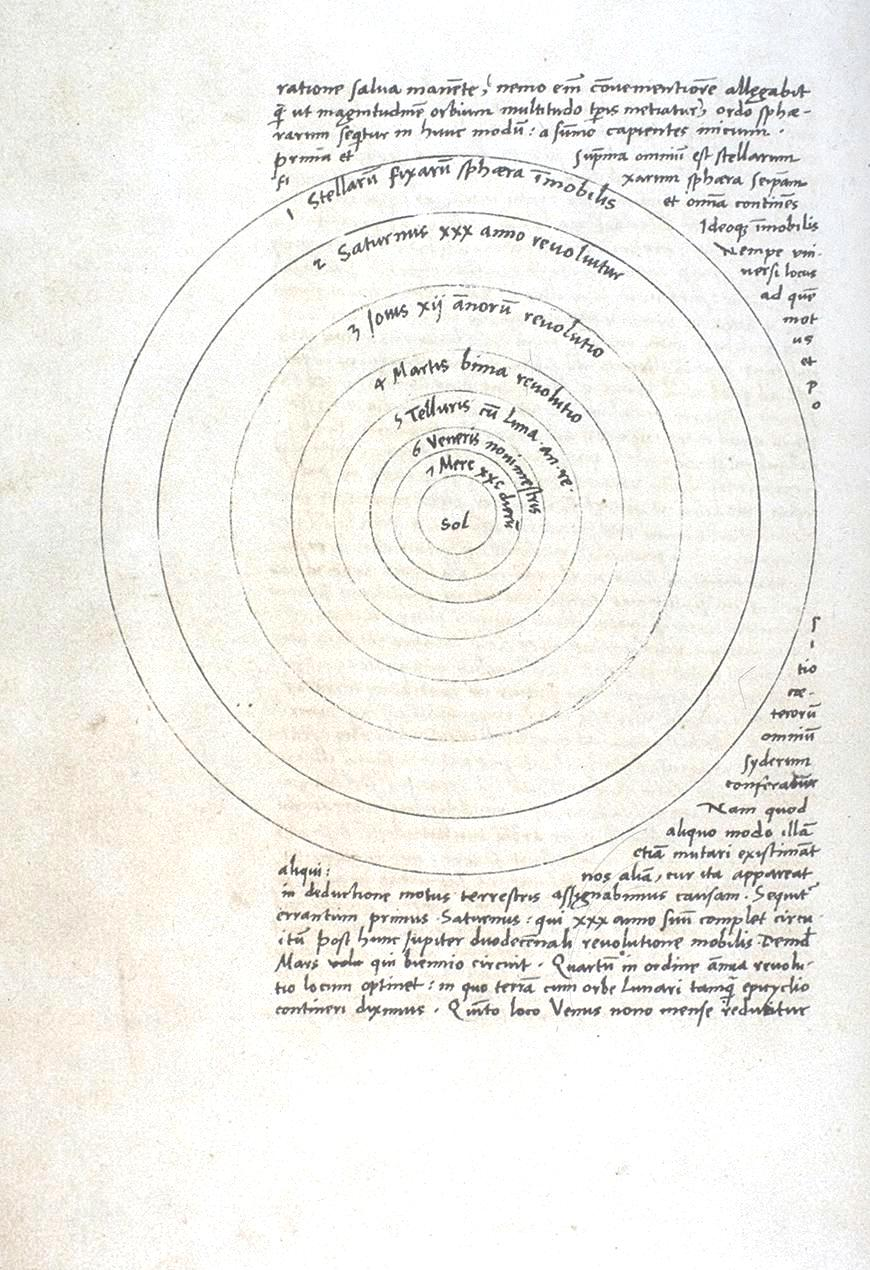
Copernicus's De Revolutionibus manuscript in the Ossolineum

With an Act of 5 January 1995, the National Ossoliński Institute was granted the status of a foundation subsidized from the National Exchequer. At the same time the Ossolineum stopped being part of the Polish Academy of Sciences. Relations between the Ossolineum and the Stefanyk Library were established in the early 1990s, but for a long time, the parties could not come to a mutually satisfactory agreement. In 1997, Poland put forward a proposal for the return of all of the Ossolineum collections from Lviv. In 2003, the Ossolineum was offered the option of full access to the Polish collection stored in the Stefanyk Library with access to copy (scanning and microfilming) for research purposes by Polish specialists. In Wrocław an agreement was reached and signed about mutual access for copying the extant Polish and Ukrainian collections in Lviv.

In 2006, the Lviv branch of the Wrocław National Ossoliński Institute was opened. It is located in the renovated premises of the former Baworowscy Library. It consists of an exhibition hall and office for an Ossolineum employee, who is responsible for copying the collection, preparing a catalogue, vetting the condition of the collection and other maintenance needs.

In 2015, the Ossolineum library housed 1,800,000 items, including complete editions, serial editions, incunabula, manuscripts, prints, drawings, exlibris bookplates, coins and medals, seals, documents relating to social events and microfilms.

In 2023, the painting by Baroque artist Alessandro Turchi Madonna with Child was returned to the Ossolineum after it had gone missing after the World War II. It was rediscovered in Japan and repatriated to Poland.

=== Continuing repository of Polish heritage ===
Ever since Józef Ossoliński donated his own vast collection to start the foundation and persuaded Henryk Lubomirski to do likewise in 1823, Poles have continued to donate their family collections to the Ossolineum. In some instances, there were deposits as "loans" or deposits for "safe-keeping" when the clouds of war began to gather. Such donations continue to this day. The story of the autograph of "Pan Tadeusz" is a case in point. When the representative of the original owners of Mickiewicz's epic, the Tarnowski family, came to reclaim their "deposit" of the Polish national bard's manuscript after the Fall of the Berlin Wall in 1989, its destiny seemed on a knife-edge. Delicate negotiations as described by the Ossolineum's director, Adolf Juzwenko, and Mr. Tarnowski eventually led to a 1/3 purchase and 2/3 donation, which managed to both indemnify the family for a sum and ensure the autograph stayed in the Ossolineum.

=== Publishing House ===
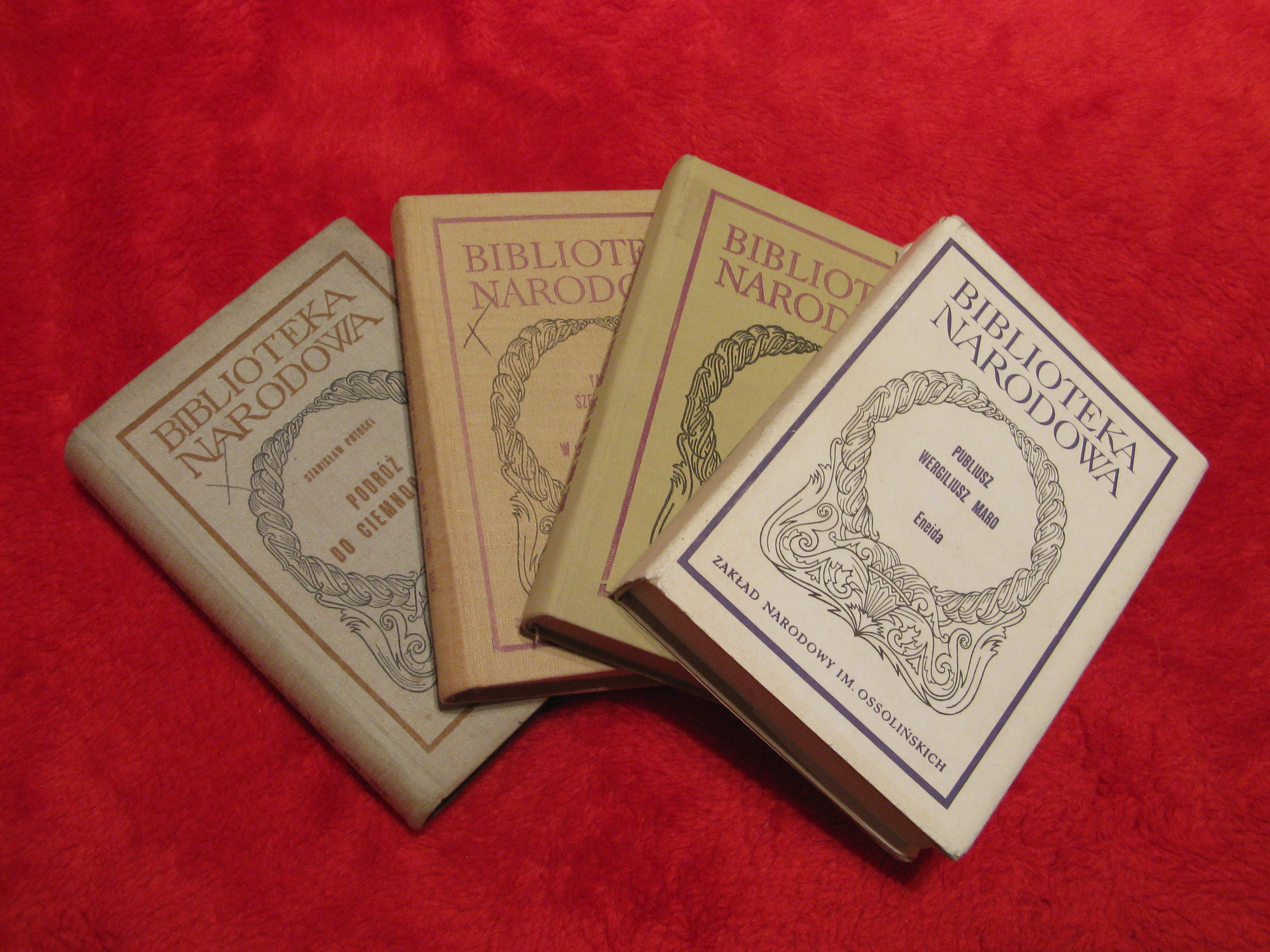
Biblioteka Narodowa book series under the Ossolineum imprint

Even before de-merging from the Polish Academy of Science, the publishing arm of the National Ossoliński Institute continued its independent publishing operation and has resumed its popular world literary classics series, Biblioteka Narodowa, as well as major publishing projects, such as Roman Aftanazy's monumental work of reference Dzieje rezydencji na dawnych kresach Rzeczypospolitej - History of Residences in Poland's Former Eastern Borderlands, (1991–1997), in eleven volumes by voivodship listing, illustrating and describing the cultural heritage contained in the myriad estates and grand residences in the once Polish Kresy and Inflanty regions.

== The Lubomirski Museum ==
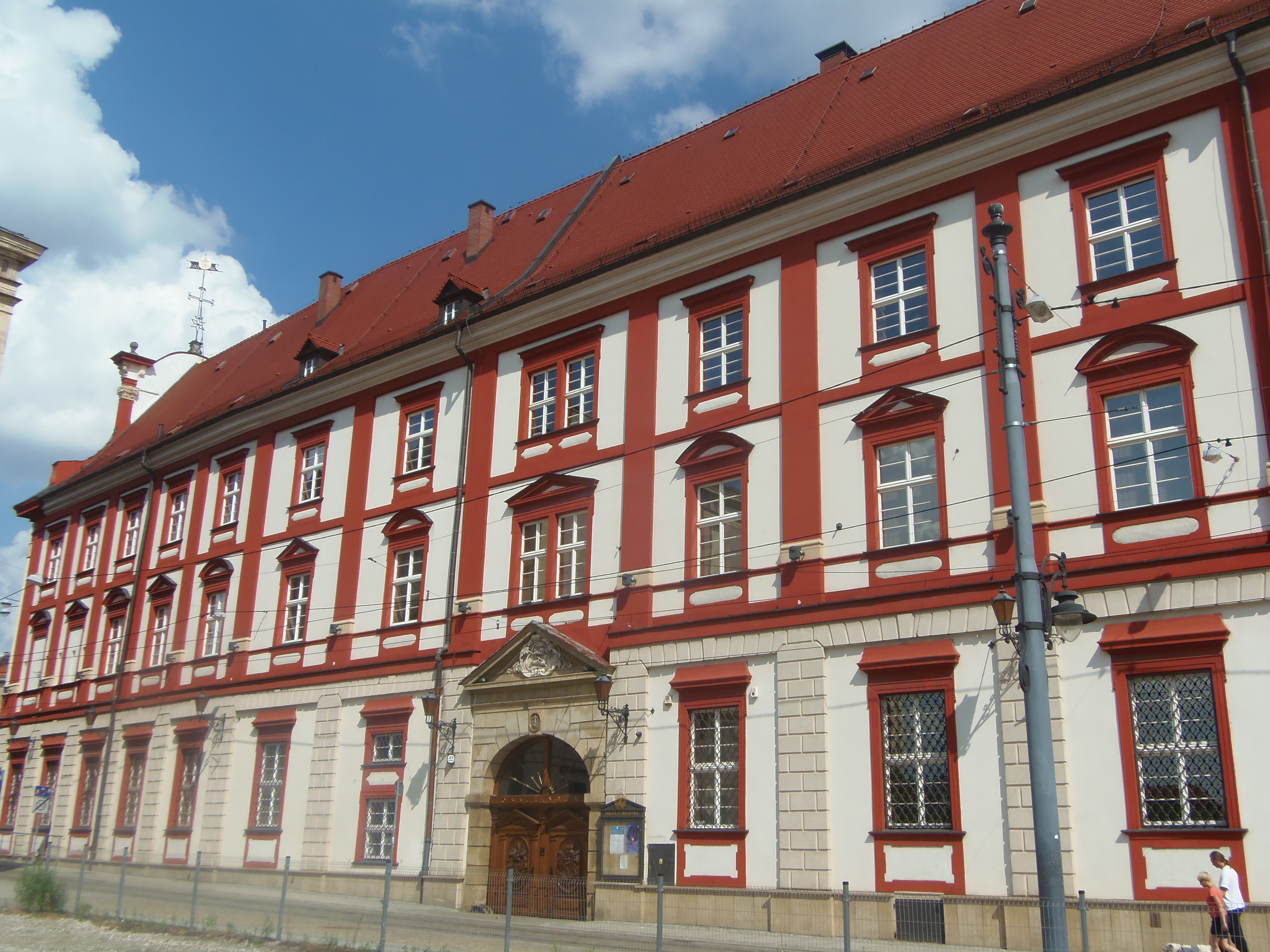
The Lubomirski Museum in Wrocław

Restituted in part on 5 January 1995 to Wrocław as the Lubomirski Museum, it is now the Fine art section of ZNIO housed in its own building. Its foundation in Lwów traces back to a pact made between prince Henryk Lubomirski and Józef Ossoliński on 25 December 1823. In 1939 the collection was seized by the Ukrainian Soviet Socialist Republic on behalf of the USSR. The original collection consisted of works by leading European masters and items related to the history of Poland.

=== Departments ===
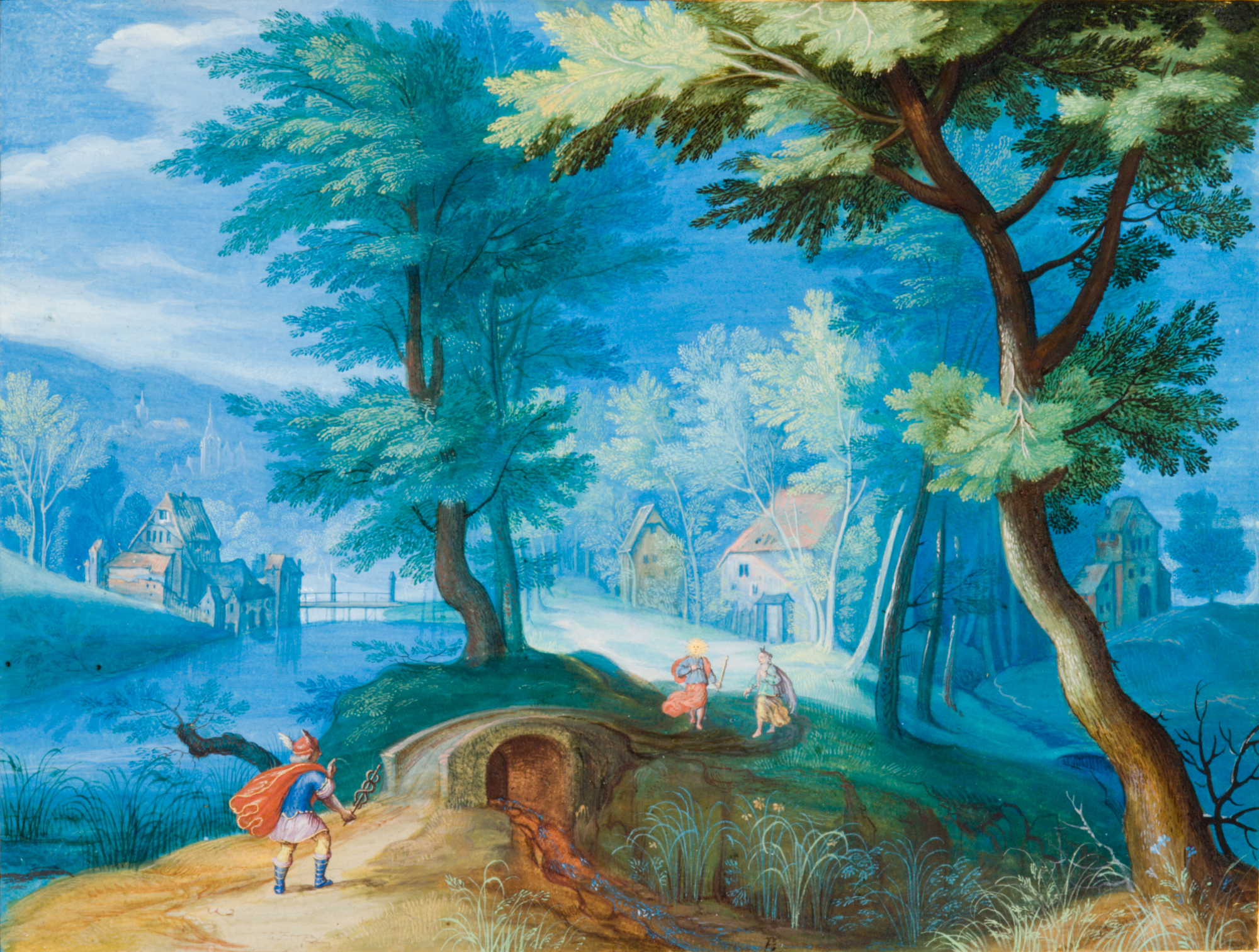
Jan Brueghel the Elder, Landscape with Hermes in Wrocław

The Lubomirski collection in Lwów was made up of:

- Archaeology and Ancient History – arranged in chronological sections it contained examples ranging from archaeological finds from the Neolithic, the Bronze and the Iron Age with many exhibits of Ceramic through to a museum in miniature of Polish martyrology, a numismatics collection to an Applied arts section with Polish sashes, Crystal glass and Jewellery, an antique horological section and objets including fans, tobacco boxes and other miniatures.
- Painting Gallery – with examples of Lucas Cranach the Elder, Canaletto, Gérard, Mengs, Poussin, Vernet, Silvestre, Titian. The print and drawings section had examples of Etchings, Lithography and prints of the German, Dutch, French and English Schools, Old master prints and drawings, including by: Jan Brueghel the Elder, Rembrandt, Peter Paul Rubens, and twenty four original drawings by Albrecht Dürer that had attracted the personal attention of Hermann Göring. The exceptional intervention of the US State Department led to the drawings being handed back to just one descendant of the Lubomirski family, who proceeded controversially to sell them off to various museums.

Representatives of the Polish school of art were: Bacciarelli, Brandt, Fałat, Juliusz and Wojciech Kossak, Lampi, Matejko and his first canvas, depicting the Union of Lublin, Piotr Michałowski, Norblin, Aleksander Orłowski, Kazimierz Pochwalski and Leon Wyczółkowski.

Items from the Lubomirski collection recovered in Kraków and in Zagrodno, Lower Silesia and part of the art that belonged to the Pawlikowski Library (Biblioteka Pawlikowskich), were handed to the Ossolineum, where they became the nucleus of the Cabinet of Graphic arts and the Numismatic section. At present there are 700 European works on paper from Henryk Lubomirski's original donation, from count Skarbek and part of the Kühnel donation. Over 1,600 drawings come from the Pawlikowski family bequest representing original works of Polish artists, from the letters "D" to "R", so the drawings by Daniel Chodowiecki and Franciszek Smuglewicz are missing. There are however European prints from the Piniński bequest and several hundred Polish Art Deco and other prints of the interwar period and a collection of 218 Miniature Portraits. The remainder has been withheld in Lviv, including most of the paintings now in the Lviv Gallery of Art and part of the graphical collection, that is, works by Chodowiecki which remain in the Vasyl Stefanyk Library. Of the Dürer drawings, apart from one, they either went missing or were sold off.

Wrocław Ossolineum
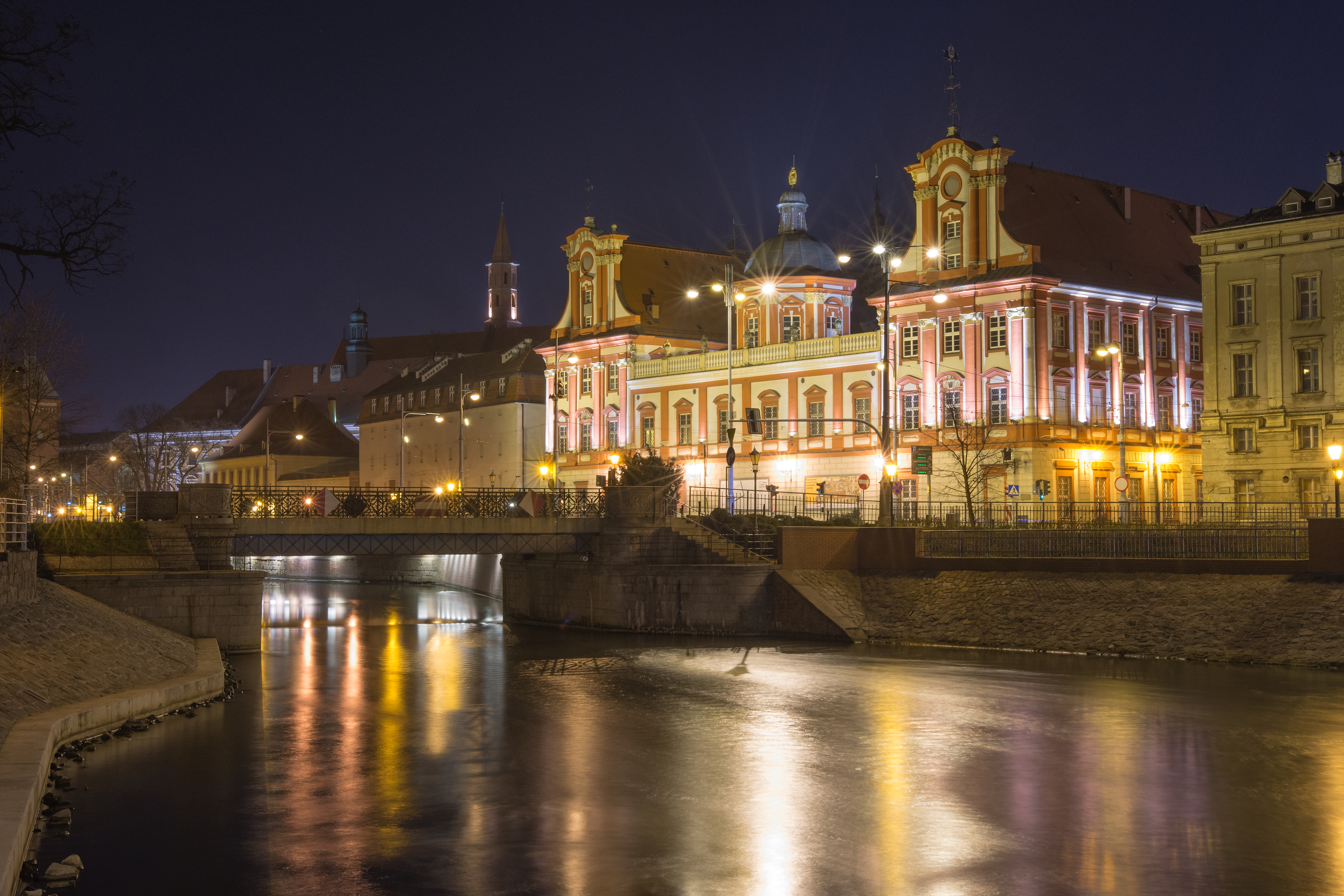
At night

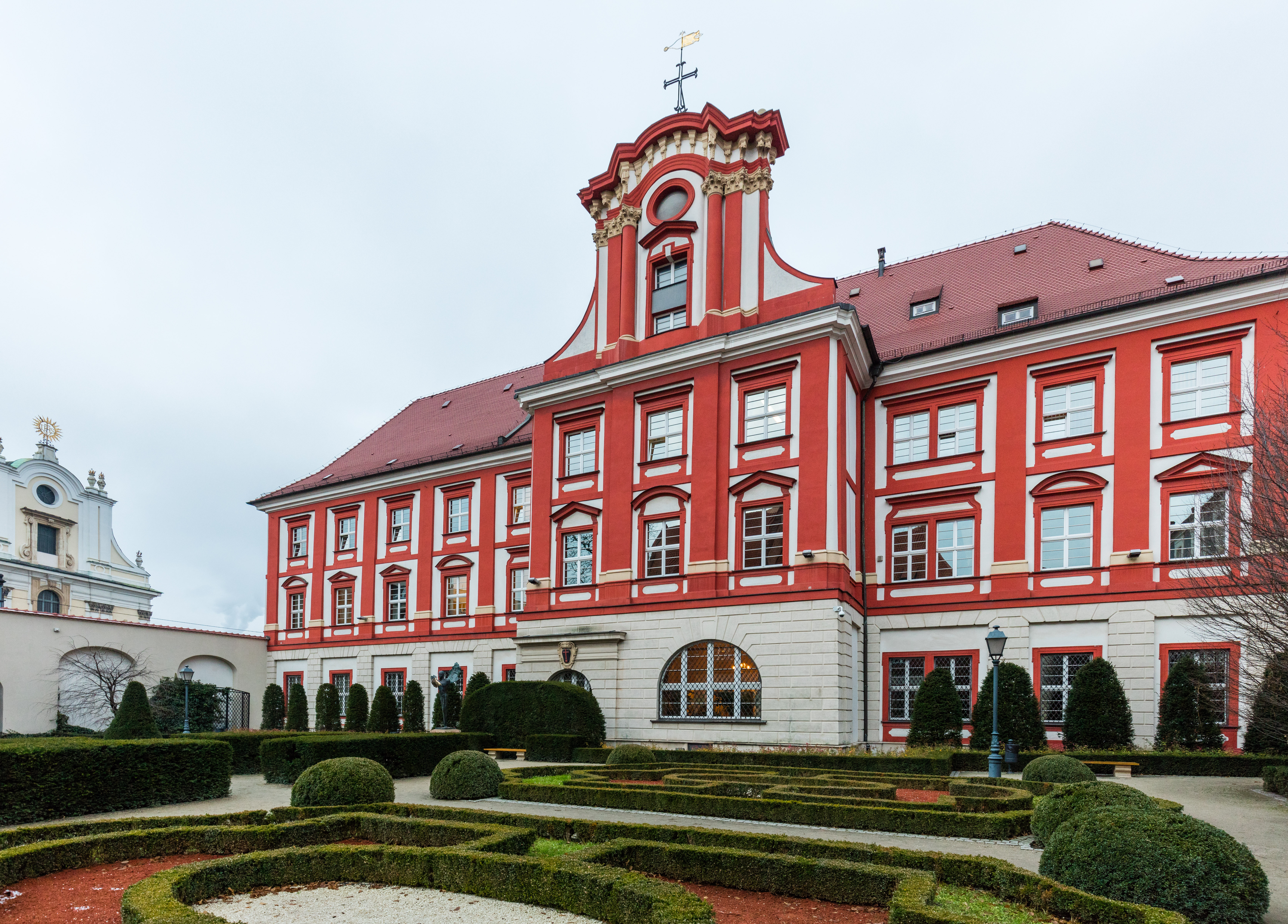
South wing, side of Nankier square

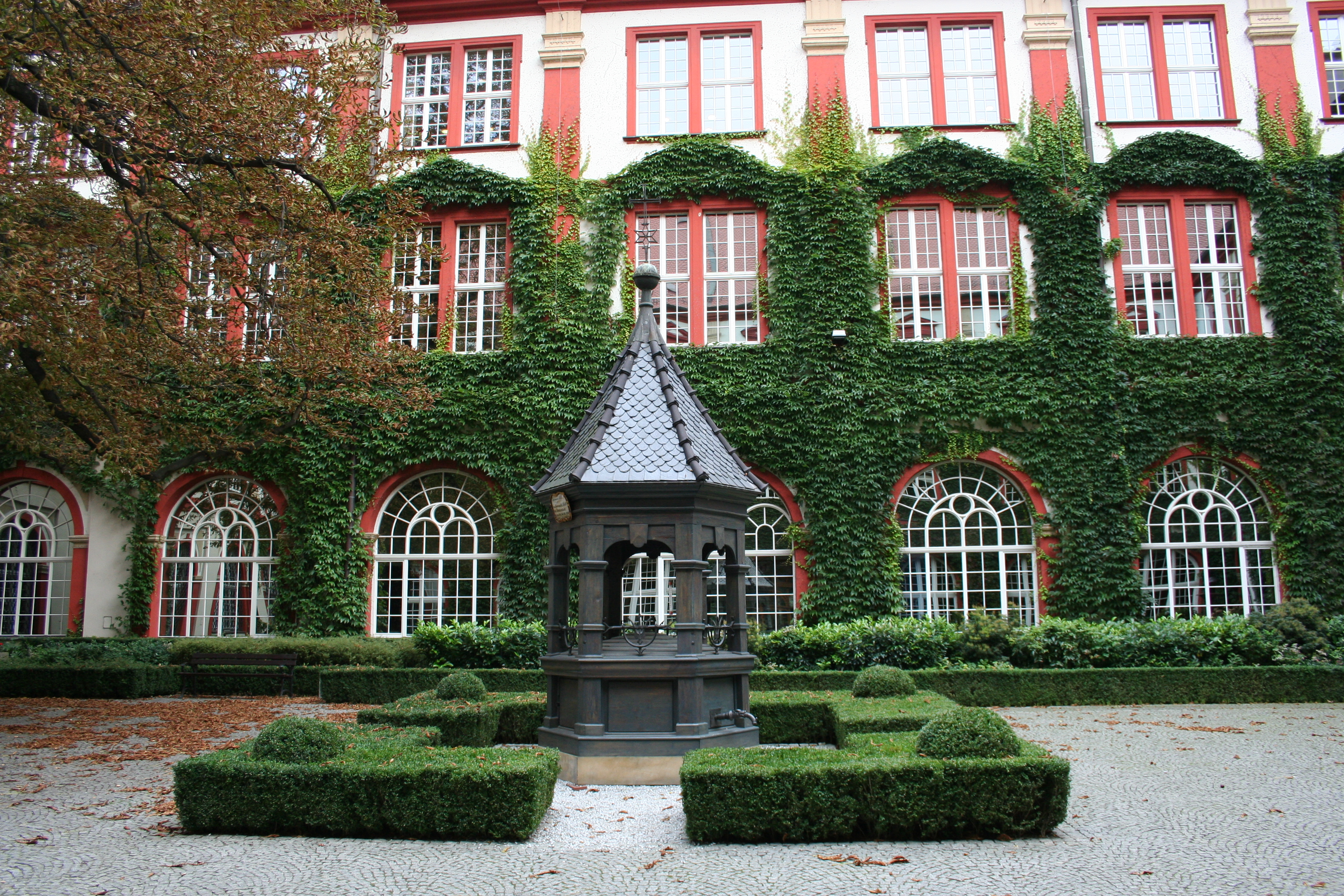
Courtyard
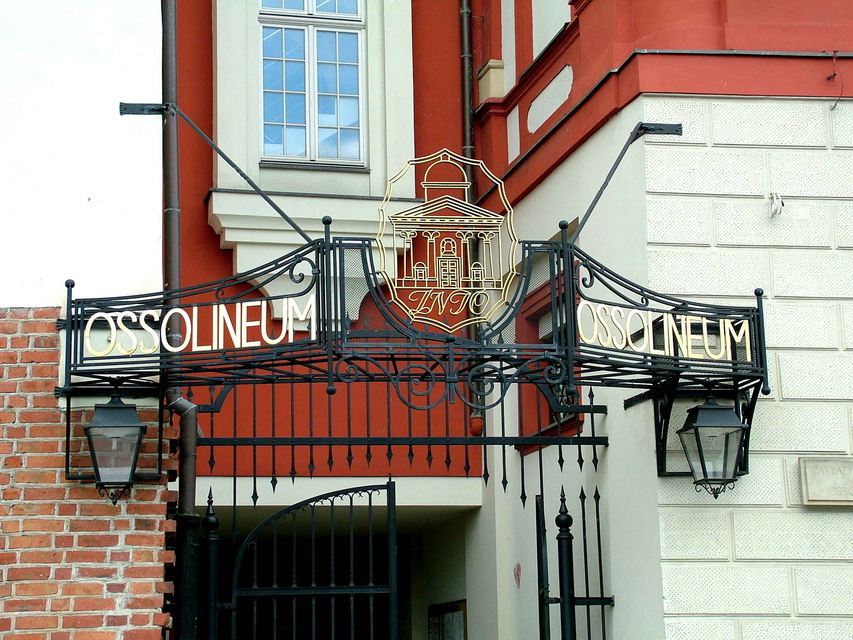
South entrance, on the Oder River, from Grodzka Street

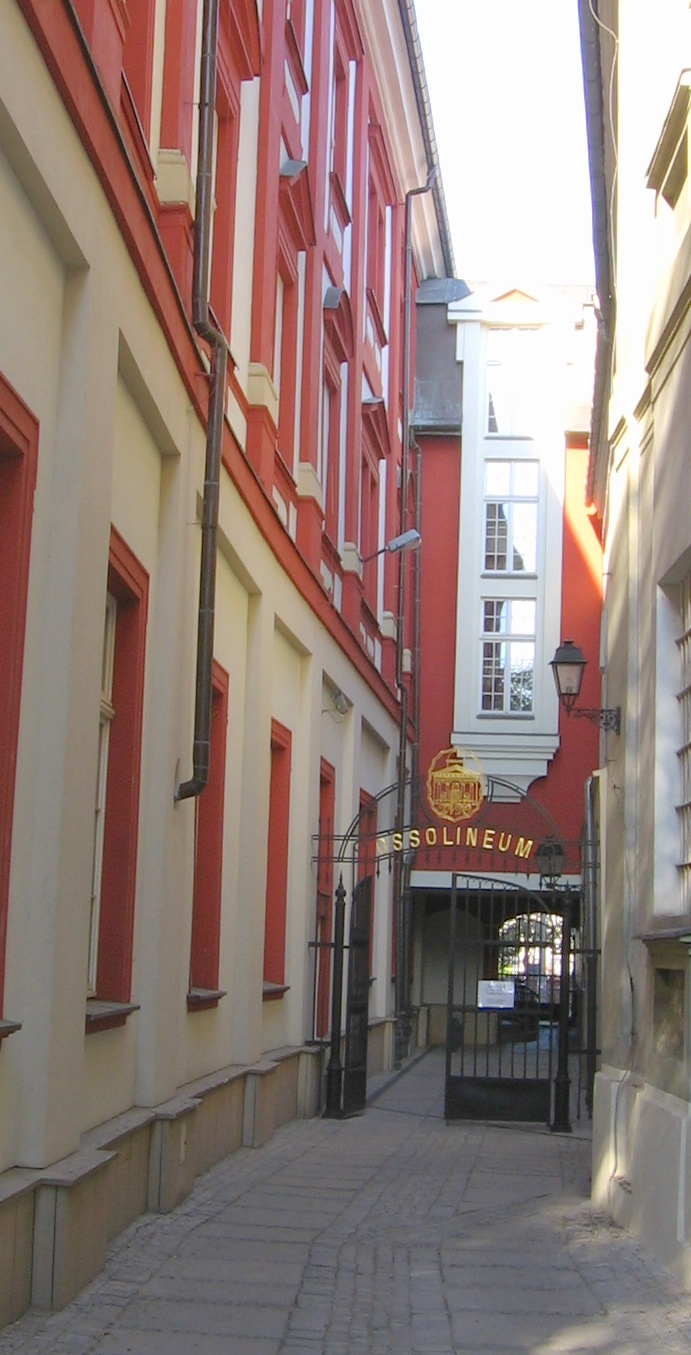
Back south entrance form Nankier square

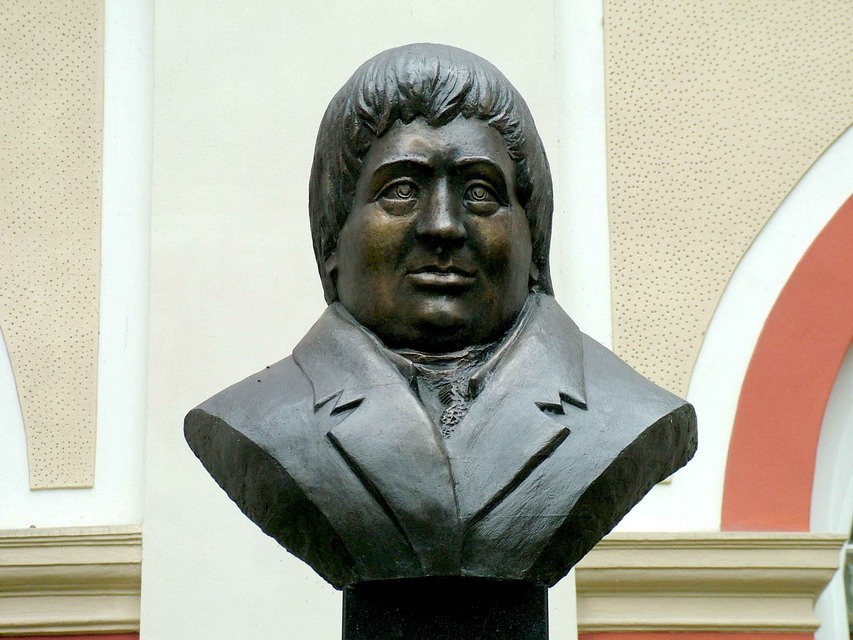
Bust of the founder
Stefanyk National Library in Lviv (original site of the Ossolineum)
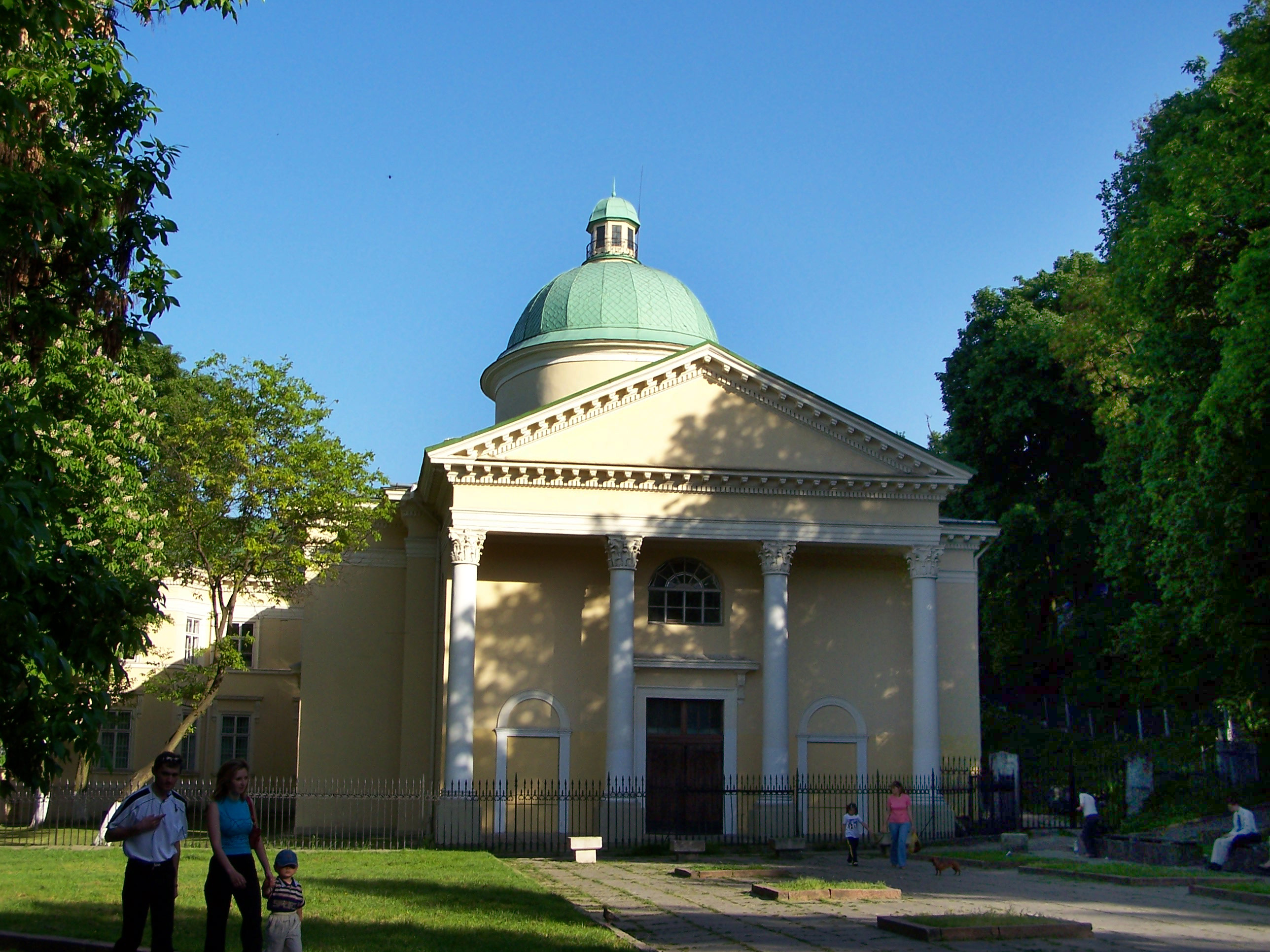
Former Ossolineum building in Lviv

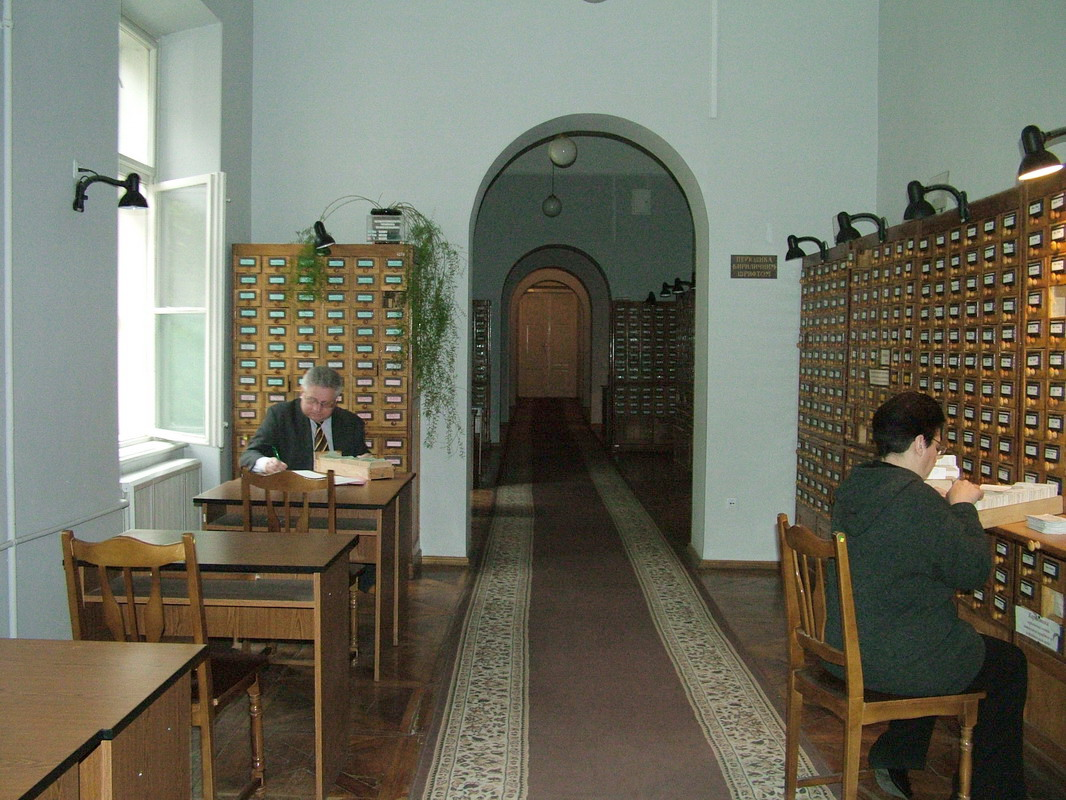
Library catalogues

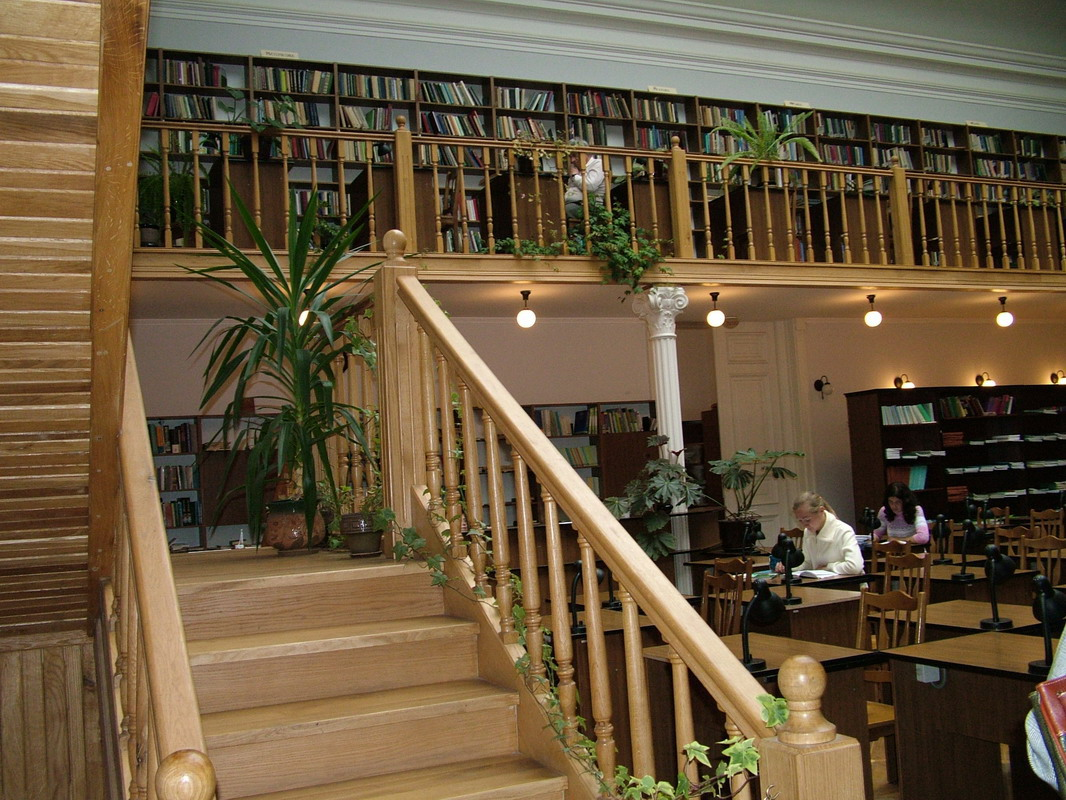
Reading room
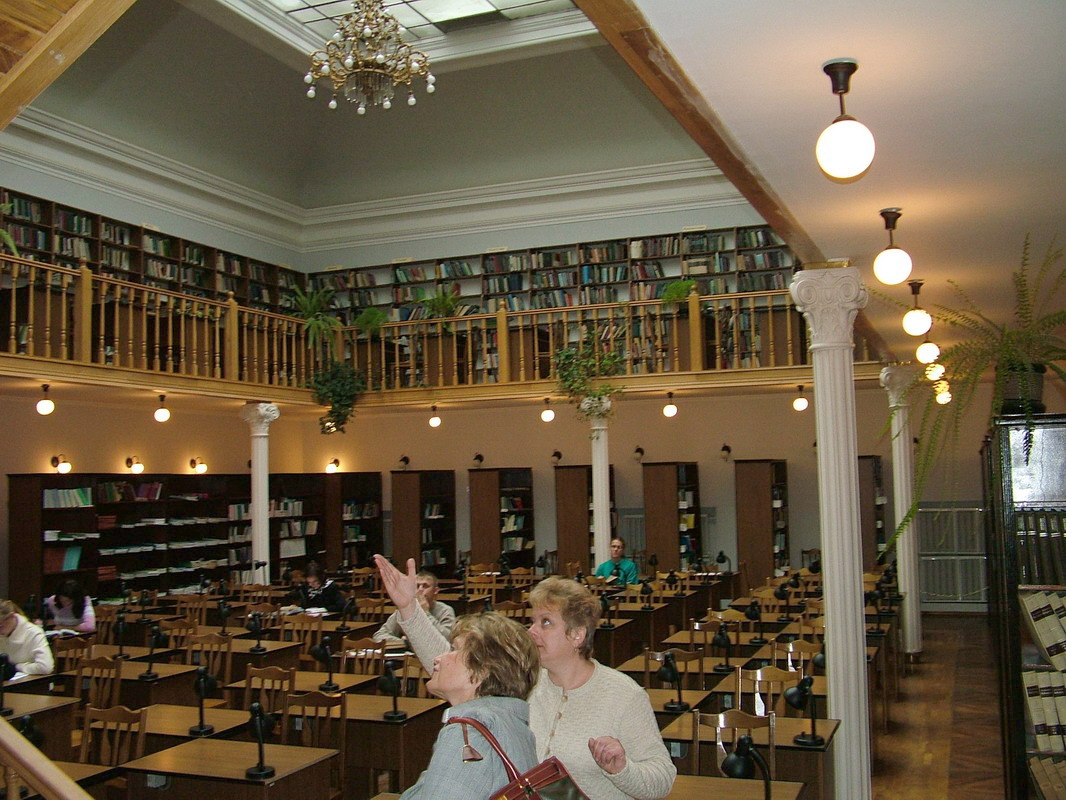
Reading room

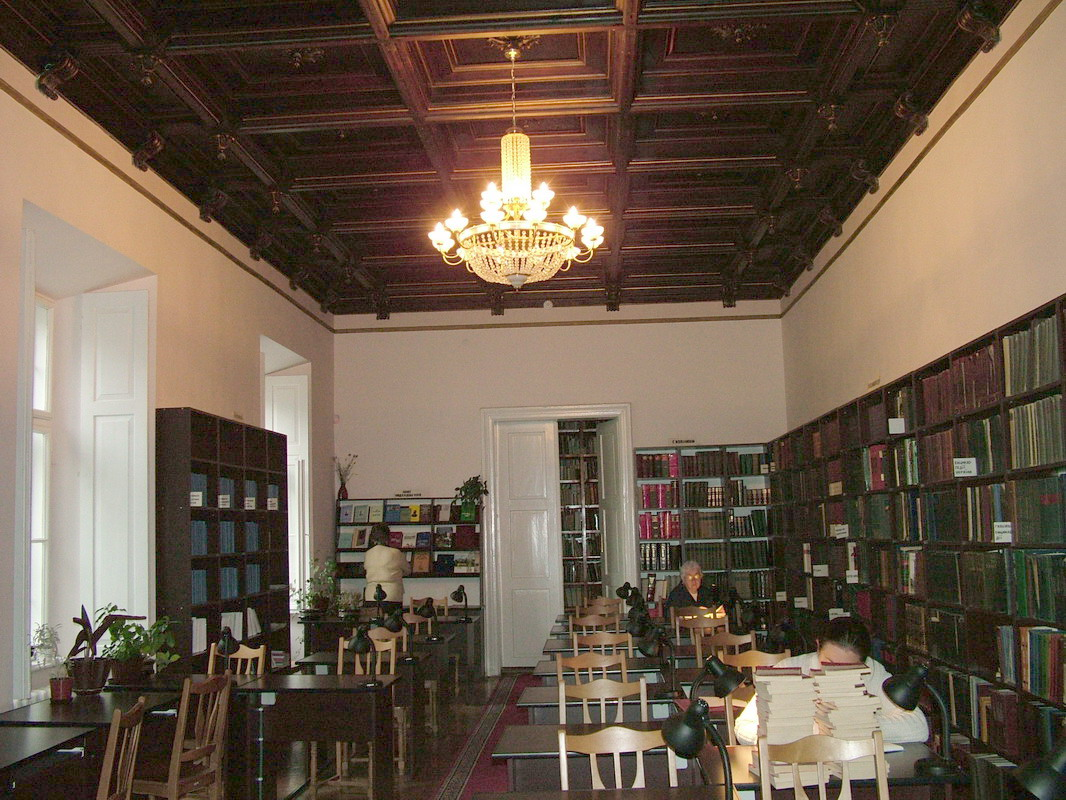
Reading room

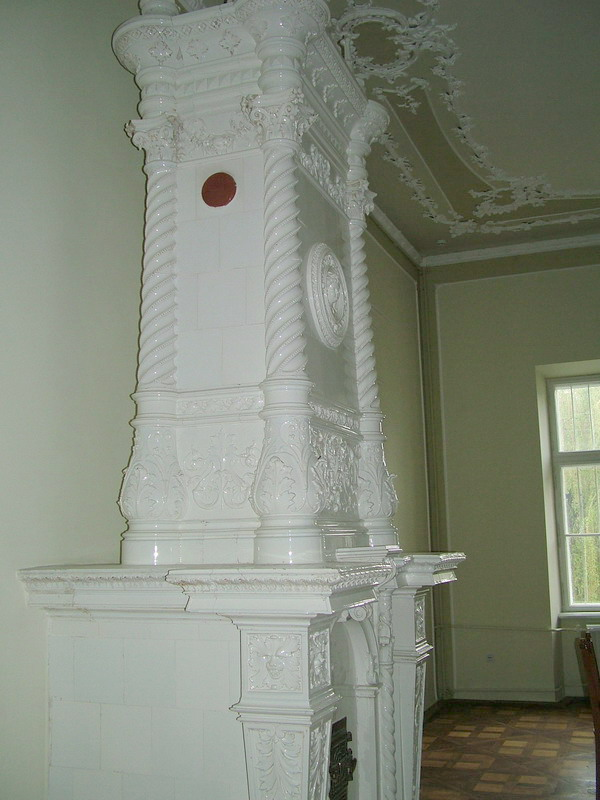
Antique stove

== Distinguished employees ==
=== Literary curators ===
- Jan Wincenty hr. Bąkowski 1818–1826
- Henryk ks. Lubomirski 1827–1850
- Maurycy hr. Dzieduszycki 1851–1869
- Jerzy ks. Lubomirski 1869–1872
- Kazimierz hr. Krasicki 1872–1882
- Andrzej ks. Lubomirski 1882

=== Assistant curators ===
- Mikołaj Michalewicz 1826–1827
- Father Franciszek Siarczyński 1827–1829
- Tadeusz Wasilewski 1829
- Ksawery hr. Wiesiołowski 1829–1832
- Konstanty Słotwiński 1832–1833
- Ignacy hr. Krasicki 1833–1834
- Gwalbert Pawlikowski 1834–1847
- Jerzy ks. Lubomirski 1847–1851
- Antoni Małecki 1869–1872 i 1882–1913
- Ignacy Dembowski 1923

=== Managers ===
- Fr. Franciszek Siarczyński 1827–1829
- Konstanty Słotwiński 1831–1834 (1837)
- Antoni Kłodziński 1839–1849
- August Bielowski 1850–1876
- Wojciech Kętrzyński 1876–1918
- Witold Bełza 1916–1920
- Adam Fischer 1916–1920
- Jerzy Koller 1916–1920
- Władysław Tadeusz Wisłocki 1916–1920
- Antoni Lewak 1918–1939
- Roman Aftanazy 1944-1981

=== Directors ===
- Wojciech Kętrzyński November 1876 - January 1918
- Ludwik Bernacki July 1918 - September 1939
- Mieczysław Gębarowicz, Władysław Tadeusz Wisłocki, Kazimierz Tyszkowski September 1939 - December 1939
- Jerzy Borejsza December 1939 - 1940
- Mieczysław Gębarowicz 1941 - February 1950 (also as a director of the Stefanyk National Library)

== See also ==
- Polish Library in Paris
- World War II looting of Poland
- Lviv National Art Gallery
- Polish population transfers (1944–1946)
- World War II evacuation and expulsion
- List of libraries in Poland
