= Mieczysław Gębarowicz =

Polish art historian, soldier, dissident, and museum director (1893–1984)

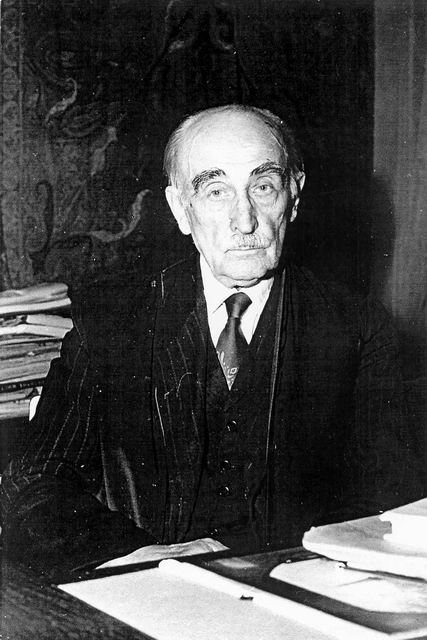
- Born: 17 December 1893; Jarosław, Austrian Empire
- Died: 18 February 1984 (aged 90); Lviv, Ukrainian SSR
- Resting place: Lyczakow cemetery, Lviv
- Education: Jan Kazimierz University
- Occupations: Professor of Art history, dissident and museum director

Mieczysław Jan Gębarowicz (17 December 1893 – 18 February 1984) was a Polish art historian, soldier, dissident, museum director and custodian of cultural heritage. He studied history and the history of art at Lwów University. During the 1940s and 1950s he was responsible for saving many Polish cultural works in Lviv, including books and manuscripts, from being destroyed or dispersed.

Gębarowicz's studies were interrupted by World War I, when he served in the Austro-Hungarian Army. In 1918, he fought for the Poles in the Defence of Lwów. After graduating from university, he lectured at the Jan Kazimierz University (now the University of Lviv), where he was awarded a doctoral degree in 1921. The following year he took up a post in the Ossolineum in Lwów, where he became a curator. Between 1923 and 1938 he lectured in art history at Lwów Polytechnic. After the outbreak of World War II, he became one of the directors of the Ossolineum.

During and after the war, Gębarowicz secretly organised the dispatch of items from the collections of the Ossolineum to safety in Kraków and Wrocław. In February 1952 he was dismissed as a director by the Soviet authorities, but was allowed to work in Lviv as a research librarian. He was forced to retire in 1962, and died in Lviv in 1984. A published author, his research on the art of Ukraine and Lviv was published posthumously.

== Early years ==
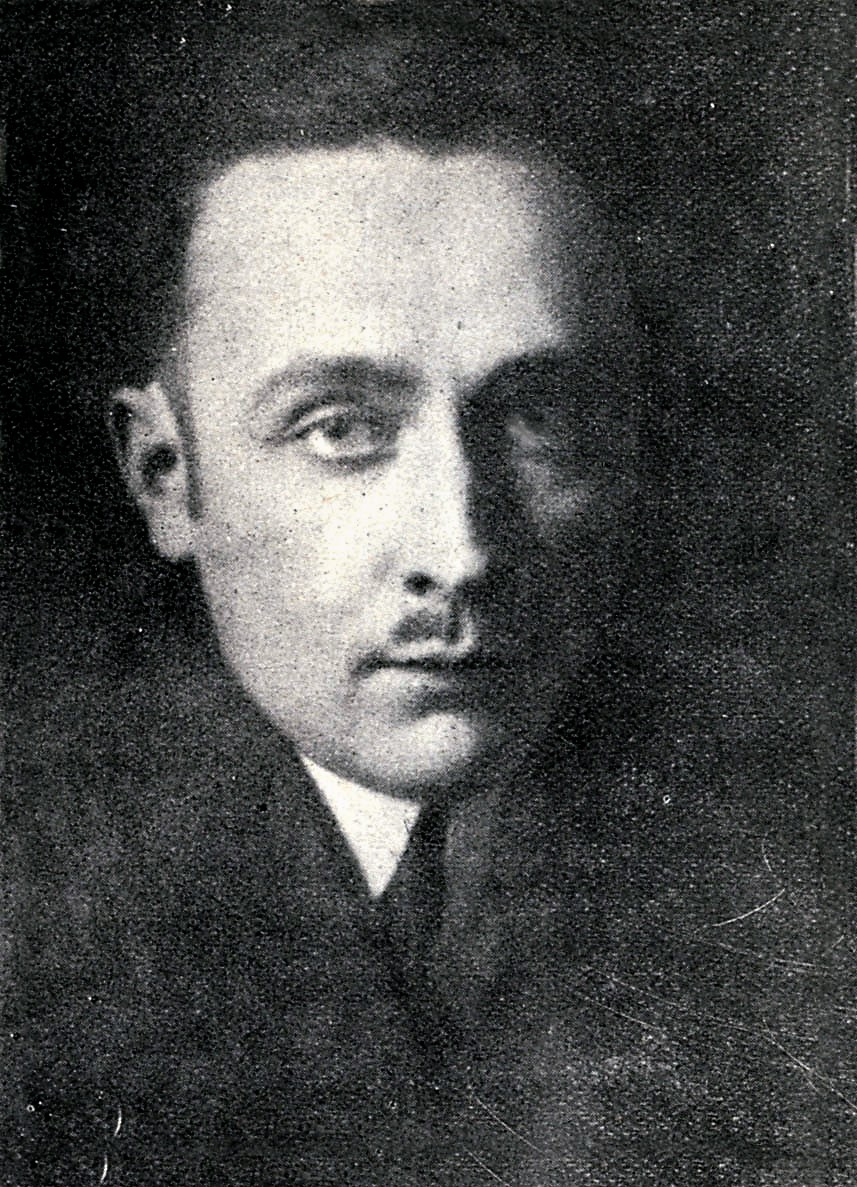
A photograph of Gębarowicz taken before 1932

Gębarowicz was born in Jarosław, one of three sons in a patriotic Polish family. His mother was Bronisława, née Smolek. His father, Teofil, was a railway engineer who served as assistant station master in Stanisławów and later as station master in Buczacz. In 1912 Mieczysław completed his schooling at Buczacz Lyceum and was already a member of two clandestine Polish youth organizations, "Zet" and Zarzewie. He went on to study history and the history of art at Lwów University. His studies were interrupted by the outbreak of World War I, when he served in the ranks of the Austro-Hungarian Army from 1915 until the end of the war in 1918. He fought alongside the Poles in the Defence of Lwów during the Polish–Ukrainian War, after which he was able to graduate.

Between 1920 and 1922 Gębarowicz was a lecturer in the History faculty of Jan Kazimierz University in a newly-independent Poland. In 1921 he was awarded a doctoral degree at the university. In 1922 he took up a post in the National Ossoliński Institute, known as the Ossolineum in Lwów, where the following year he was promoted to curator of the Lubomirski Museum. He continued with academic duties and undertook research and lecturing assignments in Italy, France. Belgium, Spain, Germany, Austria and Czechoslovakia. In 1928 he became an assistant professor in the History of Art the Department of Humanities at the university. In 1936 he became an honorary professor at Jan Kazimierz University. Between 1923 and 1938 he also lectured in art history at Lwów Polytechnic.

== World War II ==
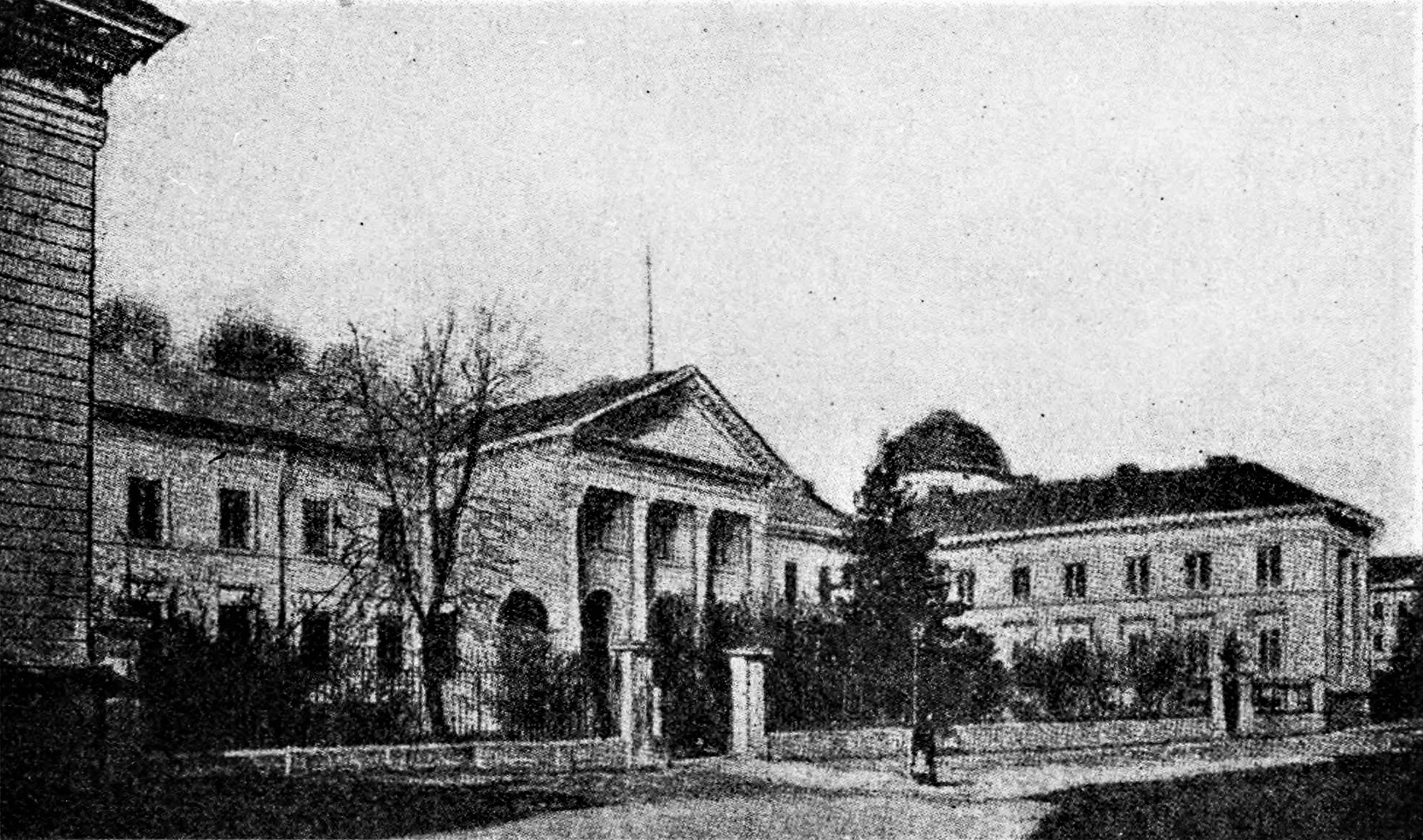
The Ossolineum, Lviv

Following the start of the invasion of Poland and the sudden death on 18 September 1939 of Ludwik Bernacki, the director of the Ossolineum, Gębarowicz found himself along with Kazimierz Tyszkowski and Władysław Wisłocki, as a director of the Institute. In December 1939 the Soviet authorities had installed the Polish Communist activist Jerzy Borejsza as director.

In 1941, the Germans occupied Lviv, and Wisłocki was murdered in unexplained circumstances. Gębarowski was secretly nominated as lead director of the institute. From this time until the return of the Soviet occupiers in July 1944, he strove to safeguard the priceless collections of the Ossolineum. In 1944, he arranged a covert consignment of 2,300 literary manuscripts by train to Kraków. Included were works by the Polish poet, playwrights and authors Juliusz Słowacki, Aleksander Fredro, Władysław Reymont, Henryk Sienkiewicz and Adam Mickiewicz. The original manuscript of Mickiewicz's Pan Tadeusz was despatched from Lviv, as well as 2,400 Polish publications and prints, and several hundred coins. These would later become the core of the relocated Ossolineum in Wrocław. Gębarowicz decided to remain in Lviv when the renewed occupation began.

== Post-war ==
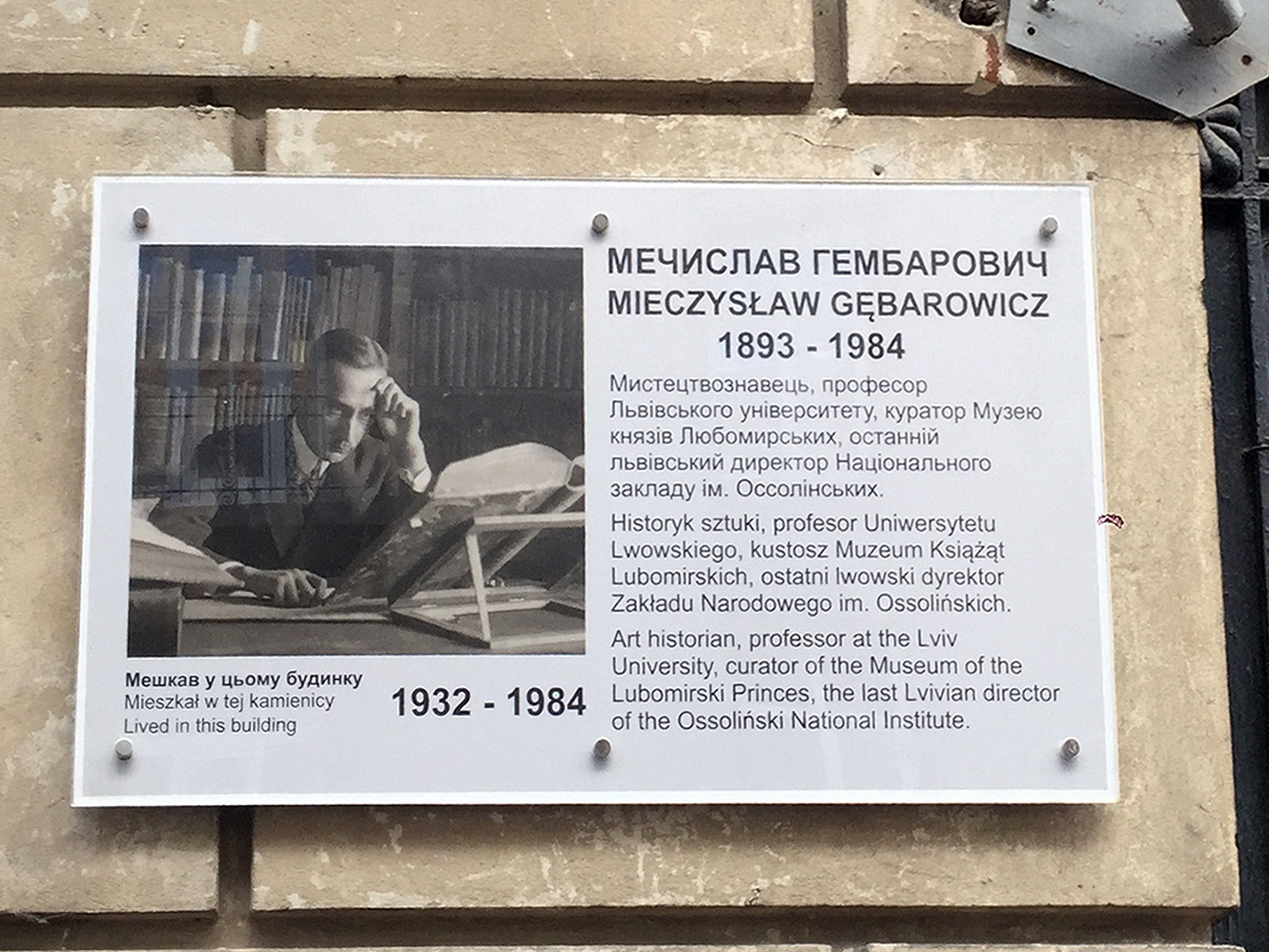
Commemorative plaque on Senatorska Street in Lviv, where Mieczysław Gębarowicz lived for 50 years

1946 saw Gębarowicz become deputy manager of the Faculty of Theory and History of Art of the renamed Ivan Franko National University of Lviv. Thanks to his efforts, in July 1946 as "a gift of the Soviet People to the People of Poland" a further 7,083 manuscripts, 35,565 antiquarian books and 107,397 prints from the 19th and 20th centuries arrived in Wrocław. In March 1947 a further 67,000 books followed. His decision to stay in the city as custodian of the remaining Polish heritage in Lviv was conditional on his accepting Soviet citizenship and rejecting not only the offer to become director of the National Museum in Kraków, but also the offers of professorships at the universities of Wrocław and Toruń.

In February 1950, together with other long-term employees of the Library, Gębarowicz was dismissed, on the grounds of being an "undesirable element". He was able to find work as a librarian in different Lviv institutions that recognised his status as that of a "junior researcher". He travelled to Poland in 1957, where he declined an offer to become director of the Ossolineum in Wrocław. In 1962, when aged 69, the Soviet authorities offered him advancement to a "senior researcher". Later that year he was forced into retirement, probably in response to the publication in Poland of his Study of the history of the arts in Late Renaissance Poland. He was also punished by being barred from accessing any of the archives in his erstwhile national collection.

In 1970, the Polish government awarded Gębarowicz a medal for developing the National Ossoliński Institute. In 1981, the Historical Institute of the Polish Academy of Sciences commissioned him to write an autobiography as part of a compendium of biographies of leading Polish academics. When the Polish authorities balked at the completed manuscript, it was published a year later by a small Catholic publisher, ZNAK.

Gębarowicz wrote research papers, despite his straitened circumstances and a lack of access to the Ossolineum sources. Two well-received studies on the art of Ukraine and of Lviv were published posthumously: The oldest iconostasis of the volosian orthodox church in Lwów (Wrocław, 2016) and Mater Misericordiae - Pokrow - Pokrowa in the art and legends of East-Central Europe (Wrocław, 1986).

Gębarowicz died in Lviv in 1984 and was buried at Lyczakow cemetery in the city. He was remembered as the "Pope of the Polish diaspora" in Lwów. A lecture hall in the National Ossoliński Institute is named in his honour.

== Works ==
=== In Polish ===
- Autobiografia. Jeden żywot w służbie nauki. Znak 5. 1982
- Zakład Narodowy imienia Ossolińskich we Lwowie. Mieczysław Gębarowicz i Kazimierz Tyszkowski. Lwów: Zakład Narodowy imienia Ossolińskich, 1926
- Studia nad dziejami kultury artystycznej późnego Renesansu w Polsce. Toruń: Towarzystwo Naukowe, 1962
- Szkice z historii sztuki XVII w. [Wyd. 1.] Toruń, 1966
- Psałterz floriański: kilka uwag z powodu nowego wydania zabytku. Lwów: Zakład Norodowy im. Ossolińskich, 1939
- Początki malarstwa historycznego w Polsce. Polska Akademia Nauk, Instytut Sztuki Wrocław : Zakład Narodowy im. Ossolińskich, 1981
- Psałterz floriański i jego geneza. [Wyd. 1.] / Wrocław: Zakład Norodowy im. Ossolińskich, 1965
- Harion Swiencickuy: prykrasy rukopysiw hałyćkoi Ukrainy XVI w. Lwów: [s.n.], 1923
- Historja sztuki. Ed. opracowali Stanisław Jan Gąsiorowski, Mieczysław Gębarowicz, Tadeusz Szydłowski, Władysław Tatarkiewicz, Jan Zarnowski, Józef Zurowski... Lwów, Wydawnictwo zakładu narodowego imienia Ossolińskich 1934. 3 vol. in-4°, fig., pl., carte
- Początki malarstwa historycznego w Polsce. Polska Akademia Nauk, Instytut Sztuki. Wrocław [etc.] Zakład Narodowy im. Ossolińskich 1981 Wroc WDNSK
- Studia nad dziejami kultury artystycznej późnego Renesansu w Polsce. Toruń Towarzystwo naukowe 1962
- Rocznik krakowski. Towarzystwo miłośników historii i zabytków Krakowa. opracowali Mieczysław Ge̡barowicz i Tadeusz Mańkowski. Kraków Ossolineum 1937
- Szkice z historii sztuki XVII w. Toruń Towarzystwo naukowe 1966
- Jan Andrzej Próchnicki (1553-1633) mecenas i bibliofil: szkic z dziejów kultury w epoce kontrreformacji. Kraków: Znak 1980.
- Portret XVI-XVIII wieku we Lwowie. Wrocław, Warszawa, Kraków: Zakład narodowy imienia Ossolińskich, wyd. Polskiej Akademii nauk 1969
- Mater Misericordiae, Pokrow, Pokrowa w sztuce i legendzie środkowo-wschodniej Europy. Wrocław: Zakład narodowy im. Ossolińskich 1986

=== In German ===
- Albrecht Dürers Zeichnungen im Lubomirski-Museum in Lemberg. Hrsg. von M. Gebarowicz und Hans Tietze. Wien: A. Schroll & Co., 1929
- Die Beziehungen Schlesiens zu den übrigen polnischen Ländern auf dem Gebiete der Kunst. (Aus: Das polnische Schlesien). Kattowitz: [s.n.], 1935

== Legacy ==
Aside from his scholarly work, it is probably due to his leadership, determination and guile in wartime, the Occupation of Poland (1939–1945), during the Fourth Partition and after, that a major part of Polish cultural heritage survived and was made available to succeeding generations. Largely owed to his initiative are:

- The National Ossoliński Institute and its associated archival and publishing facilities
- The Lubomirski Museum
- The Pan Tadeusz Museum in Wrocław.

== Bibliography ==
- Stanisław Biegański, Marian Brzezicki (December 1984). "Prof. dr Mieczysław Gębarowicz. Wspomnienie pośmiertne / Z żałobnej karty". Biuletyn (48). Koło Lwowian w Londynie: 47–48, 88.

=== Further reading ===
- Robert Bogdanowicz, "Przedwojenny profesor ze Lwowa" (in Polish) A portrait of Mieczysław Gębarowicz (TVP) Tygodnik, 23 February 2018 with video clips and illustrations
- Czartoryski-Sziler, Piotr. "Mieczysław Gębarowicz - strażnik dóbr narodowych" [Mieczysław Gębarowicz - guardian of national treasures]. Nasz Dziennik (in Polish).
- Jan Draus (2007). Uniwersytet Jana Kazimierza we Lwowie 1918-1946. Portret kresowej uczelni. Kraków: Księgarnia Akademicka. pp. 150, 168, 199, 233–234. ISBN 978-83-7188-964-6.
- Juzwenko, Adolf; Mirecki, Thaddeus, eds. (2004). The Fate of the Lubomirski Dürers: Recovering the Treasures of the Ossoliński National Institute. Wrocław: Society of the Friends of the Ossolineum. ISBN 978-83709-5-072-9.
- Maciej Matwijów, Mieczysław Gębarowicz 1893-1984, Wydawnictwo DiG, 2013. ISBN 9788371817861.
- Stanisław Nicieja, "Papież Polonii lwowskiej" Przegląd Humanistyczny., nr 12. 1987
- Witold Szolginia. 1997 Tamten Lwów. Arcylwowianie. Wrocław: Oficyna Wydawnicza "Sudety"
- Mariusz Urbanek, Mieczysław Gębarowicz. Strażnik polskich skarbów Ossolineum we Lwowie, Gazeta Wyborcza, 16 March 2018
